= List of OMIM disorder codes =

This is a list of disorder codes in the Online Mendelian Inheritance in Man (OMIM) database. These are diseases that can be inherited via a Mendelian genetic mechanism. OMIM is one of the databases housed in the U.S. National Center for Biotechnology Information.

- Isolated 17,20-lyase deficiency; 202110; CYP17A1
- 17-alpha-hydroxylase/17,20-lyase deficiency; 202110; CYP17A1
- 17-beta-hydroxysteroid dehydrogenase X deficiency; 300438; HSD17B10
- 2-methylbutyrylglycinuria; 610006; ACADSB
- 3-hydroxyacyl-coa dehydrogenase deficiency; 231530; HADHSC
- 3-hydroxyisobutryl-CoA hydrolase deficiency; 250620; HIBCH
- 3-M syndrome; 273750; CUL7
- 3-Methylcrotonyl-CoA carboxylase 1 deficiency; 210200; MCCC1
- 3-Methylcrotonyl-CoA carboxylase 2 deficiency; 210210; MCCC2
- 3-Methylglutaconic aciduria type I; 250950; AUH
- 3-Methylglutaconic aciduria type III; 258501; OPA3
- 3-Methylglutaconic aciduria type V; 610198; DNAJC19
- 46XX true hermaphroditism; 400045; SRY
- 46XY complete gonadal dysgenesis; 233420; DHH
- 46XY complete gonadal dysgenesis; 400044; SRY
- 46XY gonadal dysgenesis, complete or partial, with or without adrenal failure; 612965; NR5A1
- 46XY gonadal dysgenesis, complete, CBS2-related; 613080; CBX2
- 46XY partial gonadal dysgenesis, with minifascicular neuropathy; 607080; DHH
- 5-fluorouracil toxicity; 274270; DPYD
- 6-mercaptopurine sensitivity; 610460; TPMT
- Aarskog–Scott syndrome; 305400; FGD1
- ABCD syndrome; 600501; EDNRB
- Abetalipoproteinemia; 200100; MTP
- ACAD9 deficiency; 611126; ACAD9
- Acampomelic campomelic dysplasia; 114290; SOX9
- Achalasia-Addisonianism-Alacrimia syndrome; 231550; AAAS
- Acheiropody; 200500; LMBR1
- Achondrogenesis Ib; 600972; SLC26A2
- Achondrogenesis type 1A; 200600; TRIP11
- Achondrogenesis-hypochondrogenesis type 2; 200610; COL2A1
- Achondroplasia; 100800; FGFR3
- Achromatopsia-2; 216900; CNGA3
- Achromatopsia-3; 262300; CNGB3
- Acrocallosal syndrome; 200990; GLI3
- Acrocapitofemoral dysplasia; 607778; IHH
- Acrodermatitis enteropathica; 201100; SLC39A4
- Acrokeratosis verruciformis; 101900; ATP2A2
- Acromesomelic dysplasia, Hunter-Thompson type; 201250; GDF5
- Acromesomelic dysplasia, Maroteaux type; 602875; NPR2
- Action myoclonus-renal failure syndrome; 254900; SCARB2
- Acyl-CoA dehydrogenase, long chain, deficiency of; 201460; ACADL
- Acyl-CoA dehydrogenase, medium chain, deficiency of; 201450; ACADM
- Acyl-CoA dehydrogenase, short chain, deficiency of; 201470; ACADS
- Adenocarcinoma of lung, response to tyrosine kinase inhibitor in; 211980; EGFR
- Adenocarcinoma of lung, somatic; 211980; BRAF
- Adenocarcinoma of lung, somatic; 211980; ERBB2
- Adenocarcinoma of lung, somatic; 211980; PRKN
- Adenocarcinoma, ovarian, somatic; 604370; PRKN
- Adenomas, multiple colorectal; 608456; MUTYH
- Adenomas, salivary gland pleomorphic; 181030; PLAG1
- Adenomatous polyposis coli; 175100; APC
- Adenosine deaminase deficiency, partial; 102700; ADA
- Adenosine triphosphate, elevated, of erythrocytes; 102900; PKLR
- Adenylosuccinase deficiency; 103050; ADSL
- Adiponectin deficiency; 612556; ADIPOQ
- Adrenal cortical carcinoma; 202300; TP53
- Adrenal hyperplasia, congenital, due to 11-beta-hydroxylase deficiency; 202010; CYP11B1
- Adrenal hyperplasia, congenital, due to combined P450C17 and P450C21 deficiency; 201750; POR
- Adrenal hypoplasia, congenital, with hypogonadotropic hypogonadism; 300200; DAX1
- Adrenocorticotropic hormone deficiency; 201400; TBS19
- Adrenoleukodystrophy; 300100; ABCD1
- Adrenoleukodystrophy, neonatal; 202370; PEX1
- Adrenoleukodystrophy, neonatal; 202370; PEX10
- Adrenoleukodystrophy, neonatal; 202370; PEX13
- Adrenoleukodystrophy, neonatal; 202370; PEX26
- Adrenoleukodystrophy, neonatal; 202370; PEX5
- Adrenomyeloneuropathy; 300100; ABCD1
- Adult i phenotype with congenital cataract; 110800; GCNT2
- Adult i phenotype without cataract; 110800; GCNT2
- ADULT syndrome; 103285; TP63
- Advanced sleep phase syndrome, familial; 604348; PER2
- Afibrinogenemia, congenital; 202400; FGA
- Afibrinogenemia, congenital; 202400; FGB
- Agammaglobulinemia 1; 601495; IGHM
- Agammaglobulinemia 2; 613500; IGLL1
- Agammaglobulinemia 4; 613502; BLNK
- Agammaglobulinemia 5; 613506; LRRC8A
- Agammaglobulinemia and isolated hormone deficiency; 307200; BTK
- Agammaglobulinemia, type 1, X-linked; 300755; BTK
- AGAT deficiency; 612718; GATM
- Agenesis of the corpus callosum with peripheral neuropathy; 218000; SLC12A6
- Aicardi–Goutières syndrome 1, dominant and recessive; 225750; TREX1
- Aicardi–Goutières syndrome 2; 610181; RNASEH2B
- Aicardi–Goutières syndrome 3; 610329; RNASEH2C
- Aicardi–Goutières syndrome 4; 610333; RNASEH2A
- Aicardi–Goutières syndrome 5; 612952; SAMHD1
- AICA-ribosiduria due to ATIC deficiency; 608688; ATIC
- Alagille syndrome 2; 610205; NOTCH2
- Alagille syndrome; 118450; JAG1
- Aland Island eye disease; 300600; CACNA1F
- Albinism, brown oculocutaneous; 203200; OCA2
- Albinism, brown; 203290; TYRP1
- Albinism, oculocutaneous, type IA; 203100; TYR
- Albinism, oculocutaneous, type IB; 606952; TYR
- Albinism, oculocutaneous, type II; 203200; OCA2
- Albinism, rufous; 278400; TYRP1
- Alcohol sensitivity, acute; 610251; ALDH2
- Aldosteronism, glucocorticoid-remediable; 103900; CYP11B1
- Alexander disease; 203450; GFAP
- Alexander disease; 203450; NDUFV1
- Alkaptonuria; 203500; HGD
- Allan–Herndon–Dudley syndrome; 300523; SLC16A2
- Alopecia universalis; 203655; HR
- Alopecia, neurologic defects, and endocrinopathy syndrome; 612079; RBM28
- Alpers syndrome; 203700; POLG
- Alpha/beta T-cell lymphopenia with gamma/delta T-cell expansion, severe cytomegalovirus infection, and autoimmunity; 609889; RAG1
- Alpha-2-plasmin inhibitor deficiency; 262850; PLI
- Alpha-ketoglutarate dehydrogenase deficiency; 203740; OGDH
- Alpha-methylacetoacetic aciduria; 203750; ACAT1
- Alpha-thalassemia myelodysplasia syndrome, somatic; 300448; ATRX
- Alpha-thalassemia mental retardation syndrome; 301040; ATRX
- Alport syndrome; 301050; COL4A5
- Alport syndrome, autosomal recessive; 203780; COL4A3
- Alport syndrome, autosomal recessive; 203780; COL4A4
- Alström syndrome; 203800; ALMS1
- Alternating hemiplegia of childhood; 104290; ATP1A2
- Alveolar capillary dysplasia with misalignment of pulmonary veins; 265380; FOXF1
- Alveolar soft part sarcoma; 606243; ASPSCR1
- Alzheimer disease 1, familial; 104300; APP
- Alzheimer disease 6; 104300; AD6 (non-gene locus)
- Alzheimer disease 8; 104300; AD8 (non-gene locus)
- Alzheimer disease, late-onset, susceptibility to; 104300; NOS3
- Alzheimer disease, type 3; 607822; PSEN1
- Alzheimer disease, type 3, with spastic paraparesis and apraxia; 607822; PSEN1
- Alzheimer disease, type 3, with spastic paraparesis and unusual plaques; 607822; PSEN1
- Alzheimer disease-10; 104300; AD10 (non-gene locus)
- Alzheimer disease-2; 104310; APOE
- Alzheimer disease-4; 606889; PSEN2
- Alzheimer disease-5; 104300; AD5 (non-gene locus)
- Amelogenesis imperfecta, hypomaturation type, IIA3; 613211; WDR72
- Amelogenesis imperfecta, hypomaturation-hypoplastic type, with taurodontism; 104510; DLX3
- Amelogenesis imperfecta, hypoplastic/hypomaturation type; 301200; AMELX
- Amelogenesis imperfecta, type 3; 130900; FAM83H
- Amelogenesis imperfecta, type IB; 104500; ENAM
- Amelogenesis imperfecta, type IC; 204650; ENAM
- Amelogenesis imperfecta, type IIA1; 204700; KLK4
- Amelogenesis imperfecta, type IIA2; 612529; MMP20
- Aminoacylase 1 deficiency; 609924; ACY1
- Amish infantile epilepsy syndrome; 609056; SIAT9
- Amyloidosis, 3 or more types; 105200; APOA1
- Amyloidosis, Finnish type; 105120; GSN
- Amyloidosis, hereditary renal; 105200; FGA
- Amyloidosis, hereditary, transthyretin-related; 105210; TTR
- Amyloidosis, primary localized cutaneous; 105250; OSMR
- Amyloidosis, renal; 105200; LYZ
- Amyotrophic lateral sclerosis 10, with or without FTD; 612069; TARDBP
- Amyotrophic lateral sclerosis 11; 612577; FIG4
- Amyotrophic lateral sclerosis 4, juvenile; 602433; SETX
- Amyotrophic lateral sclerosis 6, autosomal recessive; 608030; FUS
- Amyotrophic lateral sclerosis 8; 608627; VAPB
- Amyotrophic lateral sclerosis 9; 611895; ANG
- Amyotrophic lateral sclerosis, due to SOD1 deficiency; 105400; SOD1
- Amyotrophic lateral sclerosis, juvenile; 205100; ALS2
- Amyotrophy, hereditary neuralgic; 162100; SEPTIN9
- Amytrophic lateral sclerosis 12; 613435; OPTN
- Anauxetic dysplasia; 607095; RMRP
- Androgen insensitivity syndrome; 300068; AR
- Androgen insensitivity, partial, with or without breast cancer; 312300; AR
- Anemia, congenital dyserythropoietic, type I; 224120; CDAN1
- Anemia, dyserythropoietic congenital, type II; 224100; SEC23B
- Anemia, hemolytic, due to UMPH1 deficiency; 266120; NT5C3
- Anemia, hemolytic, Rh-null, regulator type; 268150; RHAG
- Anemia, hypochromic microcytic; 206100; NRAMP2
- Anemia, sideroblastic, pyridoxine-refractory, autosomal recessive; 205950; GLRX5
- Anemia, sideroblastic, pyridoxine-refractory, autosomal recessive; 205950; SLC25A38
- Anemia, sideroblastic, with ataxia; 301310; ABCB7
- Anemia, sideroblastic, X-linked; 300751; ALAS2
- Angelman syndrome; 105830; MECP2
- Angelman syndrome; 105830; UBE3A
- Angelman syndrome-like; 105830; CDKL5
- Angioedema, hereditary, type III; 610618; F12
- Angioedema, hereditary, types I and II; 106100; C1NH
- Angiopathy, hereditary, with nephropathy, aneurysms, and muscle cramps; 611773; COL4A1
- Aniridia; 106210; PAX6
- Anonychia congenita; 206800; RSPO4
- Anterior segment mesenchymal dysgenesis; 107250; FOXE3
- Anterior segment mesenchymal dysgenesis; 107250; PITX3
- Antithrombin III deficiency; 613118; AT3
- Antley–Bixler syndrome; 207410; FGFR2
- Antley–Bixler syndrome-like with disordered steroidogenesis; 201750; POR
- Anxiety-related personality traits; 607834; SLC6A4
- Aortic aneurysm, familial thoracic 4; 132900; MYH11
- Aortic aneurysm, familial thoracic 6; 611788; ACTA2
- Aortic valve disease; 109730; NOTCH1
- Apert syndrome; 101200; FGFR2
- Aphakia, congenital primary; 610256; FOXE3
- Aplasia of lacrimal and salivary glands; 180920; FGF10
- Aplastic anemia; 609135; TERC
- Argininemia; 207800; ARG1
- Argininosuccinic aciduria; 207900; ASL
- Aromatase deficiency; 613546; CYP19A1
- Aromatase excess syndrome; 139300; CYP19A1
- Aromatic L-amino acid decarboxylase deficiency; 608643; DDC
- Arrhythmogenic right ventricular dysplasia 1; 107970; TGFB3
- Arrhythmogenic right ventricular dysplasia 2; 600996; RYR2
- Arrhythmogenic right ventricular dysplasia 5; 604400; LAMR1
- Arrhythmogenic right ventricular dysplasia 8; 607450; DSP
- Arrhythmogenic right ventricular dysplasia, familial, 10; 610193; DSG2
- Arrhythmogenic right ventricular dysplasia, familial, 11; 610476; DSC2
- Arrhythmogenic right ventricular dysplasia, familial, 12; 611528; JUP
- Arrhythmogenic right ventricular dysplasia, familial, 5; 604400; TMEM43
- Arrhythmogenic right ventricular dysplasia, familial, 9; 609040; PKP2
- Arterial calcification, generalized, of infancy; 208000; ENPP1
- Arterial tortuosity syndrome; 208050; SLC2A10
- Arthrogryposis multiplex congenita, distal type 1; 108120; TPM2
- Arthrogryposis multiplex congenita, distal type 2B; 601680; TNNI2
- Arthrogryposis, distal, type 2A; 193700; MYH3
- Arthrogryposis, distal, type 2B; 601680; MYH3
- Arthrogryposis, distal, type 2B; 601680; TPM2
- Arthrogryposis, lethal, with anterior horn cell disease; 611890; GLE1
- Arthrogryposis, renal dysfunction, and cholestasis 1; 208085; VPS33B
- Arthrogryposis, renal dysfunction, and cholestasis 2; 613404; VIPAR
- Arthropathy, progressive pseudorheumatoid, of childhood; 208230; WISP3
- Arthyrgryposis, distal, type 2B; 601680; TNNT3
- Arts syndrome; 301835; PRPS1
- Aspartylglucosaminuria; 208400; AGA
- Asphyxiating thoracic dystrophy 2; 611263; IFT80
- Asphyxiating thoracic dystrophy 3; 613091; DYNC2H1
- Asthma and nasal polyps; 208550; TBX21
- Ataxia with isolated vitamin E deficiency; 277460; TTPA
- Ataxia, cerebellar, Cayman type; 601238; ATCAY
- Ataxia, early-onset, with oculomotor apraxia and hypoalbuminemia; 208920; APTX
- Ataxia–ocular apraxia-2; 606002; SETX
- Ataxia–telangiectasia; 208900; ATM
- Ataxia–telangiectasia-like disorder; 604391; MRE11A
- Atelosteogenesis II; 256050; SLC26A2
- Atelosteogenesis, type III; 108721; FLNB
- Atelostogenesis, type I; 108720; FLNB
- Athabaskan brainstem dysgenesis syndrome; 601536; HOXA1
- Atopy; 147050; SPINK5
- ATP synthase deficiency, nuclear-encoded; 604273; ATPAF2
- Atransferrinemia; 209300; TF
- Atrial fibrillation; 608583; GJA5
- Atrial fibrillation, familial, 3; 607554; KCNQ1
- Atrial fibrillation, familial, 4; 611493; KCNE2
- Atrial fibrillation, familial, 6; 612201; NPPA
- Atrial fibrillation, familial, 7; 612240; KCNA5
- Atrial septal defect 4; 611363; TBX20
- Atrial septal defect 5; 612794; ACTC1
- Atrial septal defect 6; 613087; TLL1
- Atrial septal defect with atrioventricular conduction defects; 108900; NKX2E
- Atrial septal defect-2; 607941; GATA4
- Atrichia with papular lesions; 209500; HR
- Atrioventricular canal defect; 600309; AVSD1 (non-gene locus)
- Atrioventricular septal defect; 600309; GJA1
- Atrioventricular septal defect, partial, with heterotaxy syndrome; 606217; CRELD1
- Auditory neuropathy, autosomal recessive, 1; 601071; OTOF
- Autoimmune disease, syndromic multisystem; 613385; ITCH
- Autoimmune lymphoproliferative syndrome, type IA; 601859; TNFRSF6
- Autoimmune lymphoproliferative syndrome, type II; 603909; CASP10
- Autoimmune lymphoproliferative syndrome, type IIB; 607271; CASP8
- Autoimmune polyendocrinopathy syndrome, type I, with or without reversible metaphyseal dysplasia; 240300; AIRE
- Axenfeld–Rieger syndrome, type 1; 180500; PITX2
- Axenfeld–Rieger syndrome, type 3; 602482; FOXC1
- Azoospermia due to perturbations of meiosis; 270960; SYCP3
- Azoospermia; 415000; USP9Y
- Baller–Gerold syndrome; 218600; RECQL4
- Bamforth–Lazarus syndrome; 241850; FOXE1
- Bannayan–Riley–Ruvalcaba syndrome; 153480; PTEN
- Bardet–Biedl syndrome 1; 209900; BBS1
- Bardet–Biedl syndrome 10; 209900; BBS10
- Bardet–Biedl syndrome 11; 209900; TRIM32
- Bardet–Biedl syndrome 12; 209900; BBS12
- Bardet–Biedl syndrome 13; 209900; MKS1
- Bardet–Biedl syndrome 14; 209900; CEP290
- Bardet–Biedl syndrome 15; 209900; C2orf86
- Bardet–Biedl syndrome 2; 209900; BBS2
- Bardet–Biedl syndrome 3; 209900; ARL6
- Bardet–Biedl syndrome 4; 209900; BBS4
- Bardet–Biedl syndrome 5; 209900; BBS5
- Bardet–Biedl syndrome 6; 209900; MKKS
- Bardet–Biedl syndrome 7; 209900; BBS7
- Bardet–Biedl syndrome 8; 209900; TTC8
- Bardet–Biedl syndrome 9; 209900; PTHB1
- Bare lymphocyte syndrome, type I; 604571; TAP1
- Bare lymphocyte syndrome, type I; 604571; TAPBP
- Bare lymphocyte syndrome, type I, due to TAP2 deficiency; 604571; TAP2
- Bare lymphocyte syndrome, type II, complementation group A; 209920; MHC2TA
- Bare lymphocyte syndrome, type II, complementation group C; 209920; RFX5
- Bare lymphocyte syndrome, type II, complementation group D; 209920; RFXAP
- Bare lymphocyte syndrome, type II, complementation group E; 209920; RFX5
- Barth syndrome; 302060; TAZ
- Bart–Pumphrey syndrome; 149200; GJB2
- Bartter syndrome, type 1; 601678; SLC12A1
- Bartter syndrome, type 2; 241200; KCNJ1
- Bartter syndrome, type 3; 607364; CLCNKB
- Bartter syndrome, type 4, digenic; 602522; CLCNKB
- Bartter syndrome, type 4a; 602522; BSND
- Bartter syndrome, type 4b, digenic; 613090; CLCNKA
- Basal cell carcinoma, somatic; 605462; PTCH1
- Basal cell carcinoma, somatic; 605462; PTCH2
- Basal cell carcinoma, somatic; 605462; RASA1
- Basal cell nevus syndrome; 109400; PTCH1
- Basal ganglia disease, biotin-responsive; 607483; SLC19A3
- Basal laminar drusen; 126700; HF1
- BCG and salmonella infection, disseminated; 209950; IL12B
- BCG infection, generalized familial; 209950; IFNGR1
- Beare–Stevenson cutis gyrata syndrome; 123790; FGFR2
- Becker muscular dystrophy; 300376; DMD
- Beckwith–Wiedemann syndrome; 130650; CDKN1C
- Beckwith–Wiedemann syndrome; 130650; H19
- Beckwith–Wiedemann syndrome; 130650; KCNQ1OT1
- Beckwith–Wiedemann syndrome; 130650; NSD1
- Bernard–Soulier syndrome, benign autosomal dominant; 153670; GP1BA
- Bernard–Soulier syndrome, type A; 231200; GP1BA
- Bernard–Soulier syndrome, type B; 231200; GP1BB
- Bernard–Soulier syndrome, type C; 231200; GP9
- Best macular dystrophy; 153700; BEST1
- Bestrophinopathy; 611809; BEST1
- Beta-ureidopropionase deficiency; 613161; UPB1
- Bethlem myopathy; 158810; COL6A1
- Bethlem myopathy; 158810; COL6A2
- Bethlem myopathy; 158810; COL6A3
- Bietti crystalline corneoretinal dystrophy; 210370; CYP4V2
- Bifid nose with or without anorectal and renal anomalies; 608980; FREM1
- Bile acid malabsorption, primary; 613291; SLC10A2
- Bile acid synthesis defect, congenital, 2; 235555; AKR1D1
- Bile acid synthesis defect, congenital, 4; 214950; AMACR
- Biotinidase deficiency; 253260; BTD
- Birk–Barel mental retardation dysmorphism syndrome; 612292; KCNK9
- Birt–Hogg–Dubé syndrome; 135150; FLCN
- Björnstad syndrome; 262000; BCS1L
- Bladder cancer; 109800; KRAS
- Bladder cancer; 109800; RB1
- Bladder cancer, somatic; 109800; FGFR3
- Blau syndrome; 186580; NOD2
- Bleeding disorder due to P2RY12 defect; 609821; P2RY12
- Blepharophimosis, epicanthus inversus, and ptosis, type 1; 110100; FOXL2
- Blepharophimosis, epicanthus inversus, and ptosis, type 2; 110100; FOXL2
- Blood group--Lutheran inhibitor; 111150; KLF1
- Bloom syndrome; 210900; RECQL3
- Blue cone monochromacy; 303700; OPN1MW
- Blue cone monochromacy; 303700; OPN1LW
- Boomerang dysplasia; 112310; FLNB
- Börjeson–Forssman–Lehmann syndrome; 301900; PHF6
- Bosley–Salih–Alorainy syndrome; 601536; HOXA1
- Bothnia retinal dystrophy; 607475; RLBP1
- Bowen–Conradi syndrome; 211180; EMG1
- Brachiootic syndrome 3; 608389; SIX1
- Brachydactyly type A1; 112500; BDA1B
- Brachydactyly type A1; 112500; IHH
- Brachydactyly type A2; 112600; BMPR1B
- Brachydactyly type A2; 112600; GDF5
- Brachydactyly type B1; 113000; ROR2
- Brachydactyly type B2; 611377; NOG
- Brachydactyly type C; 113100; GDF5
- Brachydactyly type D; 113200; HOXD13
- Brachydactyly type E; 113300; HOXD13
- Brachydactyly type E2; 613382; PTHLH
- Brachydactyly-syndactyly syndrome; 610713; HOXD13
- Brachyolmia type 3; 113500; TRPV4
- Bradyopsia; 608415; RGS9
- Bradyopsia; 608415; RGS9BP
- Brain small vessel disease with Axenfeld-Rieger anomaly; 607595; COL4A1
- Brain small vessel disease with hemorrhage; 607595; COL4A1
- Branchiooculofacial syndrome; 113620; TFAP2A
- Branchiootorenal syndrome 2; 610896; SIX5
- Branchiootorenal syndrome with cataract; 113650; EYA1
- Branchiootorenal syndrome; 113650; EYA1
- Breast cancer; 114480; PPM1D
- Breast cancer; 114480; SLC22A1L
- Breast cancer; 114480; TP53
- Breast cancer, early-onset; 114480; BRIP1
- Breast cancer, invasive ductal; 114480; RAD54L
- Breast cancer, somatic; 114480; AKT1
- Breast cancer, somatic; 114480; KRAS
- Breast cancer, somatic; 114480; PIK3CA
- Breast cancer, somatic; 114480; RB1CC1
- Brittle cornea syndrome; 229200; ZNF469
- Brody myopathy; 601003; ATP2A1
- Bronchiectasis with or without elevated sweat chloride 1; 211400; SCNN1B
- Bronchiectasis with or without elevated sweat chloride 2; 613021; SCNN1A
- Bronchiectasis with or without elevated sweat chloride 3; 613071; SCNN1G
- Brooke–Spiegler syndrome; 605041; CYLD1
- Brown–Vialetto–Van Laere syndrome; 211530; C20orf54
- Bruck syndrome 2; 609220; PLOD2
- Brugada syndrome 1; 601144; SCN5A
- Brugada syndrome 2; 611777; GPD1L
- Brugada syndrome 3; 611875; CACNA1C
- Brugada syndrome 4; 611876; CACNB2
- Brugada syndrome 5; 612838; SCN1B
- Brugada syndrome 6; 613119; KCNE3
- Brugada syndrome 7; 613120; SCN3B
- Brugada syndrome 8; 613123; HCN4
- Brunner syndrome; 300615; MAOA
- Burkitt's lymphoma; 113970; MYC
- Buschke–Ollendorff syndrome; 166700; LEMD3
- C syndrome; 211750; CD96
- C5 deficiency; 609536; C5
- C6 deficiency; 612446; C6
- C7 deficiency; 610102; C7
- Caffey disease; 114000; COL1A1
- Campomelic dysplasia with autosomal sex reversal; 114290; SOX9
- Campomelic dysplasia; 114290; SOX9
- Camptodactyly-arthropathy-coxa vara-pericarditis syndrome; 208250; PRG4
- Camurati–Engelmann disease; 131300; TGFB1
- Canavan disease; 271900; ASPA
- Candidiasis, familial chronic mucocutaneous, autosomal dominant; 613108; CLEC7A
- Candidiasis, familial chronic mucocutaneous, autosomal recessive; 212050; CARD9
- Capillary malformation-arteriovenous malformation; 608354; RASA1
- Carbamoyl phosphate synthetase I deficiency; 237300; CPS1
- Carbohydrate-deficient glycoprotein syndrome, type Ib; 602579; MPI
- Carboxypeptidase N deficiency; 212070; CPN1
- Carcinoid tumors, intestinal; 114900; SDHD
- Cardiac arrhythmia, ankyrin-B-related; 600919; ANK2
- Cardiac conduction defect, nonspecific; 612838; SCN1B
- Cardioencephalomyopathy, fatal infantile, due to cytochrome c oxidase deficiency; 604377; SCO2
- Cardiofaciocutaneous syndrome; 115150; BRAF
- Cardiofaciocutaneous syndrome; 115150; KRAS
- Cardiofaciocutaneous syndrome; 115150; MAP2K1
- Cardiofaciocutaneous syndrome; 115150; MAP2K2
- Cardiomyopathy, dilated 1C; 601493; LDB3
- Cardiomyopathy, dilated; 115200; MYBPC3
- Cardiomyopathy, dilated, 1A; 115200; LMNA
- Cardiomyopathy, dilated, 1AA; 612158; ACTN2
- Cardiomyopathy, dilated, 1BB; 612877; DSG2
- Cardiomyopathy, dilated, 1CC; 613122; NEXN
- Cardiomyopathy, dilated, 1D; 601494; TNNT2
- Cardiomyopathy, dilated, 1DD; 613172; RBM20
- Cardiomyopathy, dilated, 1E; 601154; SCN5A
- Cardiomyopathy, dilated, 1EE; 613252; MYH6
- Cardiomyopathy, dilated, 1FF; 613286; TNNI3
- Cardiomyopathy, dilated, 1G; 604145; TTN
- Cardiomyopathy, dilated, 1GG; 613642; SDHA
- Cardiomyopathy, dilated, 1I; 604765; DES
- Cardiomyopathy, dilated, 1J; 605362; EYA4
- Cardiomyopathy, dilated, 1L; 606685; SGCD
- Cardiomyopathy, dilated, 1M; 607482; CSRP3
- Cardiomyopathy, dilated, 1N; 607487; TCAP
- Cardiomyopathy, dilated, 1O; 608569; ABCC9
- Cardiomyopathy, dilated, 1P; 609909; PLN
- Cardiomyopathy, dilated, 1R; 613424; ACTC1
- Cardiomyopathy, dilated, 1S; 613426; MYH7
- Cardiomyopathy, dilated, 1W; 611407; VCL
- Cardiomyopathy, dilated, 1X; 611615; FKTN
- Cardiomyopathy, dilated, 1Y; 611878; TPM1
- Cardiomyopathy, dilated, 1Z; 611879; TNNC1
- Cardiomyopathy, dilated, 2A; 611880; TNNI3
- Cardiomyopathy, dilated, 3A; 300069; TAZ
- Cardiomyopathy, dilated, 3B; 302045; DMD
- Cardiomyopathy, familial hypertrophic, 1; 192600; MYH7
- Cardiomyopathy, familial hypertrophic, 10; 608758; MYL2
- Cardiomyopathy, familial hypertrophic, 11; 612098; ACTC1
- Cardiomyopathy, familial hypertrophic, 12; 612124; CSRP3
- Cardiomyopathy, familial hypertrophic, 13; 613243; TNNC1
- Cardiomyopathy, familial hypertrophic, 14; 613251; MYH6
- Cardiomyopathy, familial hypertrophic, 15; 613255; VCL
- Cardiomyopathy, familial hypertrophic; 192600; CAV3
- Cardiomyopathy, familial hypertrophic; 192600; SLC25A4
- Cardiomyopathy, familial hypertrophic, 2; 115195; TNNT2
- Cardiomyopathy, familial hypertrophic, 3; 115196; TPM1
- Cardiomyopathy, familial hypertrophic, 4; 115197; MYBPC3
- Cardiomyopathy, familial hypertrophic, 8; 608751; MYL3
- Cardiomyopathy, familial restrictive; 115210; TNNI3
- Cardiomyopathy, familial restrictive, 3; 612422; TNNT2
- Cardiomyopathy, hypertrophic 6, with WPW; 600858; PRKAG2
- Cardiomyopathy, hypertrophic, midventricular, digenic; 192600; MYLK2
- Carney complex variant; 608837; MYH8
- Carney complex, type 1; 160980; PRKAR1A
- Carnitine deficiency, systemic primary; 212140; SLC22A5
- Carotid intimal medial thickness 1; 609338; PPARG
- Carpal tunnel syndrome, familial; 115430; TTR
- Carpenter syndrome; 201000; RAB23
- Cartilage–hair hypoplasia; 250250; RMRP
- Cataract with late-onset corneal dystrophy; 604219; PAX6
- Cataract, autosomal dominant, multiple types 1; 611597; BFSP2
- Cataract, cerulean, type 2; 601547; CRYBB2
- Cataract, congenital nuclear, 2; 609741; CRYBB3
- Cataract, congenital nuclear, autosomal recessive 3; 611544; CRYBB1
- Cataract, congenital zonular, with sutural opacities; 600881; CRYBA1
- Cataract, congenital; 604219; BFSP2
- Cataract, congenital, cerulean type, 3; 608983; CRYGD
- Cataract, congenital, X-linked; 302200; NHS
- Cataract, Coppock-like; 604307; CRYBB2
- Cataract, Coppock-like; 604307; CRYGC
- Cataract, cortical, juvenile-onset; 611391; BFSP1
- Cataract, crystalline aculeiform; 115700; CRYGD
- Cataract, juvenile, with microcornea and glucosuria; 612018; SLC16A12
- Cataract, juvenile-onset; 604219; BFSP2
- Cataract, lamellar 2; 610425; CRYBA4
- Cataract, lamellar; 116800; HSF4
- Cataract, Marner type; 116800; HSF4
- Cataract, nonnuclear polymorphic congenital; 601286; CRYGD
- Cataract, polymorphic and lamellar; 604219; MIP
- Cataract, posterior polar, 1; 613020; EPHA2
- Cataract, posterior polar, 3; 605387; CHMP4B
- Cataract, posterior polar, 4; 610623; PITX3
- Cataract, posterior polar, 4, syndromic; 610623; PITX3
- Cataract, sutural, with punctate and cerulean opacities; 607133; CRYBB2
- Cataract, zonular pulverulent-1; 116200; GJA8
- Cataract, zonular pulverulent-3; 601885; GJA3
- Cataract-microcornea syndrome; 116150; GJA8
- CATSHL syndrome; 610474; FGFR3
- Caudal duplication anomaly; 607864; AXIN1
- Caudal regression syndrome; 600145; VANGL1
- Cavernous malformations of CNS and retina; 116860; CCM1
- CD59 deficiency; 612300; CD59
- CD8 deficiency, familial; 608957; CD8A
- Cenani–Lenz syndactyly syndrome; 212780; LRP4
- Central core disease; 117000; RYR1
- Central hypoventilation syndrome; 209880; GDNF
- Central hypoventilation syndrome, congenital; 209880; ASCL1
- Central hypoventilation syndrome, congenital; 209880; BDNF
- Central hypoventilation syndrome, congenital; 209880; EDN3
- Central hypoventilation syndrome, congenital; 209880; PMX2B
- Central hypoventilation syndrome, congenital; 209880; RET
- Cerebellar ataxia and mental retardation with or without quadrupedal locomotion 3; 613227; CA8
- Cerebellar ataxia; 604290; CP
- Cerebellar hypoplasia and mental retardation with or without quadrupedal locomotion 1; 224050; VLDLR
- Cerebral amyloid angiopathy; 105150; CST3
- Cerebral amyloid angiopathy, Dutch, Italian, Iowa, Flemish, Arctic variants; 605714; APP
- Cerebral arteriopathy with subcortical infarcts and leukoencephalopathy; 125310; NOTCH3
- Cerebral cavernous malformations 3; 603285; PDCD10
- Cerebral cavernous malformations-1; 116860; CCM1
- Cerebral cavernous malformations-2; 603284; C7orf22
- Cerebral dysgenesis, neuropathy, ichthyosis, and palmoplantar keratoderma syndrome; 609528; SNAP29
- Cerebral palsy, spastic quadriplegic, 3; 612936; AP4M1
- Cerebral palsy, spastic quadriplegic; 612900; KANK1
- Cerebral palsy, spastic, symmetric, autosomal recessive; 603513; GAD1
- Cerebrocostomandibular-like syndrome; 611209; COG1
- Cerebrooculofacioskeletal syndrome 1; 214150; ERCC6
- Cerebrooculofacioskeletal syndrome 2; 610756; ERCC2
- Cerebrooculofacioskeletal syndrome 4; 610758; ERCC1
- Cerebrotendinous xanthomatosis; 213700; CYP27A1
- Ceroid lipofuscinosis, neuronal 8; 600143; CLN8
- Ceroid lipofuscinosis, neuronal, 10; 610127; CTSD
- Ceroid lipofuscinosis, neuronal, 7; 610951; MFSD8
- Ceroid lipofuscinosis, neuronal, 8, Northern epilepsy variant; 610003; CLN8
- Ceroid lipofuscinosis, neuronal 1, infantile; 256730; PPT1
- Ceroid-lipofuscinosis, neuronal 2, classic late infantile; 204500; TPP1
- Ceroid lipofuscinosis, neuronal 3, juvenile; 204200; CLN3
- Ceroid-lipofuscinosis, neuronal-5, variant late infantile; 256731; CLN5
- Ceroid-lipofuscinosis, neuronal-6, variant late infantile; 601780; CLN6
- Cervical cancer, somatic; 603956; FGFR3
- Chanarin–Dorfman syndrome; 275630; ABHD5
- Char syndrome; 169100; TFAP2B
- Charcot–Marie–Tooth disease, axonal, type 2F; 606595; HSPB1
- Charcot–Marie–Tooth disease, axonal, type 2K; 607831; GDAP1
- Charcot–Marie–Tooth disease, axonal, type 2L; 608673; HSPB8
- Charcot–Marie–Tooth disease, axonal, type 2M; 606482; DNM2
- Charcot–Marie–Tooth disease, axonal, type 2N; 613287; AARS
- Charcot–Marie–Tooth disease, axonal, with vocal cord paresis; 607706; GDAP1
- Charcot–Marie–Tooth disease, dominant intermediate 3; 607791; MPZ
- Charcot–Marie–Tooth disease, dominant intermediate B; 606482; DNM2
- Charcot–Marie–Tooth disease, dominant intermediate C; 608323; YARS
- Charcot–Marie–Tooth disease, recessive intermediate, A; 608340; GDAP1
- Charcot–Marie–Tooth disease, recessive intermediate, B; 613641; KARS
- Charcot–Marie–Tooth disease type 1A; 118220; PMP22
- Charcot–Marie–Tooth disease type 1B; 118200; MPZ
- Charcot–Marie–Tooth disease type 1C; 601098; LITAF
- Charcot–Marie–Tooth disease type 1D; 607678; EGR2
- Charcot–Marie–Tooth disease type 1E; 118300; PMP22
- Charcot–Marie–Tooth disease type 1F; 607734; NEFL
- Charcot–Marie–Tooth disease type 2A1; 118210; KIF1B
- Charcot–Marie–Tooth disease type 2A2; 609260; MFN2
- Charcot–Marie–Tooth disease type 2B; 600882; RAB7
- Charcot–Marie–Tooth disease type 2B1; 605588; LMNA
- Charcot–Marie–Tooth disease type 2B2; 605589; MED25
- Charcot–Marie–Tooth disease type 2D; 601472; GARS
- Charcot–Marie–Tooth disease type 2E; 607684; NEFL
- Charcot–Marie–Tooth disease type 2I; 607677; MPZ
- Charcot–Marie–Tooth disease type 2J; 607736; MPZ
- Charcot–Marie–Tooth disease type 4A; 214400; GDAP1
- Charcot–Marie–Tooth disease type 4B1; 601382; MTMR2
- Charcot–Marie–Tooth disease type 4B2; 604563; SBF2
- Charcot–Marie–Tooth disease type 4C; 601596; SH3TC2
- Charcot–Marie–Tooth disease type 4D; 601455; NDRG1
- Charcot–Marie–Tooth disease type 4F; 145900; PRX
- Charcot–Marie–Tooth disease type 4H; 609311; FGD4
- Charcot–Marie–Tooth disease type 4J; 611228; FIG4
- Charcot–Marie–Tooth disease, X-linked recessive, 5; 311070; PRPS1
- Charcot–Marie–Tooth neuropathy, X-linked dominant, 1; 302800; GJB1
- CHARGE syndrome; 214800; CHD7
- CHARGE syndrome; 214800; SEMA3E
- Chédiak–Higashi syndrome; 214500; CHS1
- Cherubism; 118400; SH3BP2
- Chilblain lupus; 610448; TREX1
- CHILD syndrome; 308050; NSDHL
- Chloride diarrhea, congenital, Finnish type; 214700; SLC26A3
- Cholestasis, benign recurrent intrahepatic, 2; 605479; ABCB11
- Cholestasis, benign recurrent intrahepatic; 243300; ATP8B1
- Cholestasis, familial intrahepatic, of pregnancy; 147480; ABCB4
- Cholestasis, progressive familial intrahepatic 1; 211600; ATP8B1
- Cholestasis, progressive familial intrahepatic 2; 601847; ABCB11
- Cholestasis, progressive familial intrahepatic 3; 602347; ABCB4
- Cholestasis, progressive familial intrahepatic 4; 607765; HSD3B7
- Cholesteryl ester storage disease; 278000; LIPA
- Chondrocalcinosis 2; 118600; ANKH
- Chondrodysplasia punctata, rhizomelic, type 2; 222765; GNPAT
- Chondrodysplasia punctata, X-linked dominant; 302960; EBP
- Chondrodysplasia punctata, X-linked recessive; 302950; ARSL
- Chondrodysplasia, Blomstrand type; 215045; PTHR1
- Chondrodysplasia, Grebe type; 200700; GDF5
- Chondrosarcoma; 215300; EXT1
- Chondrosarcoma, extraskeletal myxoid; 612237; TAF15
- Chondrosarcoma, extraskeletal myxoid; 612237; TFG
- Chondrosarcoma, extraskeletal myxoid; 612237; NR4A3
- Chorea, hereditary benign; 118700; NKX2-1
- Choreoacanthocytosis; 200150; VPS13A
- Choreoathetosis, hypothyroidism, and neonatal respiratory distress; 610978; NKX2-1
- Choroidal dystrophy, central areolar 2; 613105; PRPH2
- Choroid plexus papilloma; 260500; TP53
- Choroideremia; 303100; CHM
- Chromosome 22q13.3 deletion syndrome; 606232; SHANK3
- Chromosome 5q14.3 deletion syndrome; 613443; MEF2C
- Chrondrodysplasia, acromesomelic, with genital anomalies; 609441; BMPR1B
- Chronic granulomatous disease due to deficiency of NCF-1; 233700; NCF1
- Chronic granulomatous disease due to deficiency of NCF-2; 233710; NCF2
- Chronic granulomatous disease, autosomal, due to deficiency of CYBA; 233690; CYBA
- Chronic granulomatous disease, X-linked; 306400; CYBB
- Chylomicron retention disease; 246700; SAR1B
- Ciliary dyskinesia, primary, 1, with or without situs inversus; 244400; DNAI1
- Ciliary dyskinesia, primary, 10; 612518; KTU
- Ciliary dyskinesia, primary, 11; 612649; RSPH4A
- Ciliary dyskinesia, primary, 12; 612650; RSPH9
- Ciliary dyskinesia, primary, 13; 613193; LRRC50
- Ciliary dyskinesia, primary, 3, with or without situs inversus; 608644; DNAH5
- Ciliary dyskinesia, primary, 6; 610852; TXNDC3
- Ciliary dyskinesia, primary, 7, with or without situs inversus; 611884; DNAH11
- Ciliary dyskinesia, primary, 9, with or without situs inversus; 612444; DNAI2
- CINCA syndrome; 607115; NLRP3
- Cirrhosis, North American Indian childhood type; 604901; CIRH1A
- Citrullinemia; 215700; ASS1
- Citrullinemia, adult-onset type II; 603471; SLC25A13
- Citrullinemia, type II, neonatal-onset; 605814; SLC25A13
- Cleft lip/palate-ectodermal dysplasia syndrome; 225060; HVEC
- Cleft palate and mental retardation; 119540; SATB2
- Cleft palate with ankyloglossia; 303400; TBX22
- Cleft palate, isolated; 119540; UBB
- Cleidocranial dysplasia; 119600; RUNX2
- C-like syndrome; 605039; CD96
- Clopidogrel, impaired responsiveness to; 609535; CYP2C
- Clubfoot, congenital; 119800; PITX1
- COACH syndrome; 216360; CC2D2A
- COACH syndrome; 216360; RPGRIP1L
- COACH syndrome; 216360; TMEM67
- Cockayne syndrome type A; 216400; ERCC8
- Cockayne syndrome type B; 133540; ERCC6
- Cocoon syndrome; 613630; CHUK
- Coenzyme Q10 deficiency; 607426; APTX
- Coenzyme Q10 deficiency; 607426; COQ8A
- Coenzyme Q10 deficiency; 607426; COQ2
- Coenzyme Q10 deficiency; 607426; COQ9
- Coenzyme Q10 deficiency; 607426; PDSS1
- Coenzyme Q10 deficiency; 607426; PDSS2
- Coffin–Lowry syndrome; 303600; RPS6KA3
- Cohen syndrome; 216550; COH1
- Cold-induced autoinflammatory syndrome, familial; 120100; NLRP3
- Cold-induced sweating syndrome 1; 610313; CLCF1
- Cold-induced sweating syndrome; 272430; CRLF1
- Coloboma of optic nerve; 120430; PAX6
- Coloboma, ocular; 120200; PAX6
- Coloboma, ocular; 120200; SHH
- Colon cancer, somatic; 114500; PTPRJ
- Colorblindness, deutan; 303800; OPN1MW
- Colorblindness, tritan; 190900; OPN1SW
- Colorectal adenomatous polyposis, autosomal recessive, with pilomatricomas; 132600; MUTYH
- Colorectal cancer; 114500; AXIN2
- Colorectal cancer; 114500; BUB1B
- Colorectal cancer; 114500; EP300
- Colorectal cancer; 114500; NRAS
- Colorectal cancer; 114500; PDGFRL
- Colorectal cancer; 114500; TP53
- Colorectal cancer, hereditary nonpolyposis, type 1; 120435; MSH2
- Colorectal cancer, hereditary nonpolyposis, type 2; 609310; MLH1
- Colorectal cancer, hereditary nonpolyposis, type I; 613244; EPCAM
- Colorectal cancer, somatic; 109800; FGFR3
- Colorectal cancer, somatic; 114500; AKT1
- Colorectal cancer, somatic; 114500; APC
- Colorectal cancer, somatic; 114500; FLCN
- Colorectal cancer, somatic; 114500; MLH3
- Colorectal cancer, somatic; 114500; PIK3CA
- Combined cellular and humoral immune defects with granulomas; 233650; RAG1
- Combined cellular and humoral immune defects with granulomas; 233650; RAG2
- Combined factor V and VIII deficiency; 227300; LMAN1
- Combined hyperlipidemia, familial; 144250; LPL
- Combined immunodeficiency, X-linked, moderate; 312863; IL2RG
- Combined malonic and methylmalonic aciduria (CMAMMA); 614265; ACSF3
- Combined malonic and methylmalonic aciduria (CMAMMA); 248360; MLYCD
- Combined oxidative phosphorylation deficiency 1; 609060; GFM1
- Combined oxidative phosphorylation deficiency 2; 610498; MRPS16
- Combined oxidative phosphorylation deficiency 3; 610505; TSFM
- Combined oxidative phosphorylation deficiency 4; 610678; TUFM
- Combined oxidative phosphorylation deficiency 5; 611719; MRPS22
- Combined oxidative phosphorylation deficiency 6; 300816; AIFM1
- Combined SAP deficiency; 611721; PSAP
- Complement component 4, partial deficiency of; 120790; C1NH
- Complement factor H deficiency; 609814; HF1
- Complement factor I deficiency; 610984; CFI
- Complex I, mitochondrial respiratory chain, deficiency of; 252010; NDUFS6
- Cone dystrophy 4; 613093; PDE6C
- Cone dystrophy-3; 602093; GUCA1A
- Cone–rod dystrophy 10; 610283; SEMA4A
- Cone–rod dystrophy 11; 610381; RAXL1
- Cone–rod dystrophy 12; 612657; PROM1
- Cone–rod dystrophy 13; 608194; RPGRIP1
- Cone–rod dystrophy 14; 602093; GUCA1A
- Cone–rod dystrophy 15; 613660; CDHR1
- Cone–rod dystrophy 3; 604116; ABCA4
- Cone–rod dystrophy 5; 600977; PITPNM3
- Cone–rod dystrophy; 601777; GUCY2D
- Cone–rod dystrophy 7; 603649; RIMS1
- Cone–rod dystrophy 9; 612775; ADAM9
- Cone–rod dystrophy, X-linked, 3; 300476; CACNA1F
- Cone–rod dystrophy-1; 304020; RPGR
- Cone–rod retinal dystrophy-2; 120970; CRX
- Congenital bilateral absence of vas deferens; 277180; CFTR
- Congenital cataracts, facial dysmorphism, and neuropathy; 604168; CTDP1
- Congenital disorder of glycosylation, type Ia; 212065; PMM2
- Congenital disorder of glycosylation, type Ic; 603147; ALG6
- Congenital disorder of glycosylation, type Id; 601110; ALG3
- Congenital disorder of glycosylation, type Ie; 608799; DPM1
- Congenital disorder of glycosylation, type If; 609180; MPDU1
- Congenital disorder of glycosylation, type Ig; 607143; ALG12
- Congenital disorder of glycosylation, type Ih; 608104; ALG8
- Congenital disorder of glycosylation, type Ii; 607906; ALG2
- Congenital disorder of glycosylation, type IIA; 212066; MGAT2
- Congenital disorder of glycosylation, type IIb; 606056; GCS1
- Congenital disorder of glycosylation type IIc; 266265; SLC35C1
- Congenital disorder of glycosylation, type IId; 607091; B4GALT1
- Congenital disorder of glycosylation, type IIe; 608779; COG7
- Congenital disorder of glycosylation, type IIf; 603585; SLC35A1
- Congenital disorder of glycosylation, type IIg; 611209; COG1
- Congenital disorder of glycosylation, type IIh; 611182; COG8
- Congenital disorder of glycosylation, type IIj; 613489; COG4
- Congenital disorder of glycosylation, type Ij; 608093; DPAGT2
- Congenital disorder of glycosylation, type Ik; 608540; ALG1
- Congenital disorder of glycosylation, type Il; 608776; ALG9
- Congenital disorder of glycosylation, type Im; 610768; TMEM15
- Congenital disorder of glycosylation, type In; 612015; RFT1
- Congenital disorder of glycosylation, type Io; 612937; DPM3
- Congenital disorder of glycosylation, type Ip; 612379; SRD5A3
- Congenital heart defects, nonsyndromic, 1, X-linked; 306955; ZIC3
- Congenital heart disease, nonsyndromic, 2; 612863; TAB2
- Conjunctivitis, ligneous; 217090; PLG
- Conotruncal anomaly face syndrome; 217095; TBX1
- Contractural arachnodactyly, congenital; 121050; FBN2
- Convulsions, benign familial infantile, 3; 607745; SCN2A1
- Convulsions, familial febrile, 4; 604352; GPR98
- COPD, rate of decline of lung function in; 606963; MMP1
- Coproporphyria; 121300; CPOX
- Cornea plana congenita, recessive; 217300; KERA
- Corneal dystrophy polymorphous posterior, 2; 609140; COL8A2
- Corneal dystrophy, Avellino type; 607541; TGFBI
- Corneal dystrophy, congenital stromal; 610048; DCN
- Corneal dystrophy, crystalline, of Schnyder; 121800; UBIAD1
- Corneal dystrophy, epithelial basement membrane; 121820; TGFBI
- Corneal dystrophy, Fuchs endothelial, 1; 136800; COL8A2
- Corneal dystrophy, Fuchs endothelial, 4; 613268; SLC4A11
- Corneal dystrophy, Fuchs endothelial, 6; 613270; ZEB1
- Corneal dystrophy, gelatinous drop-like; 204870; TACSTD2
- Corneal dystrophy, Groenouw type I; 121900; TGFBI
- Corneal dystrophy, hereditary polymorphous posterior; 122000; VSX1
- Corneal dystrophy, lattice type I; 122200; TGFBI
- Corneal dystrophy, lattice type IIIA; 608471; TGFBI
- Corneal dystrophy, posterior polymorphous, 3; 609141; ZEB1
- Corneal dystrophy, Reis-Bucklers type; 608470; TGFBI
- Corneal dystrophy, Thiel-Behnke type; 602082; TGFBI
- Corneal endothelial dystrophy 2; 217700; SLC4A11
- Corneal endothelial dystrophy and perceptive deafness; 217400; SLC4A11
- Corneal fleck dystrophy; 121850; PIKFYVE
- Cornelia de Lange syndrome 1; 122470; NIPBL
- Cornelia de Lange syndrome 2; 300590; DXS423E
- Cornelia de Lange syndrome 3; 610759; CSPG6
- Corpus callosum, agenesis of, with mental retardation, ocular coloboma and micrognathia; 300472; IGBP1
- Corpus callosum, partial agenesis of; 304100; L1CAM
- Cortical dysplasia-focal epilepsy syndrome; 610042; CNTNAP2
- Corticosteroid-binding globulin deficiency; 611489; CBG
- Cortisone reductase deficiency; 604931; H6PD
- Cortisone reductase deficiency; 604931; HSD11B1
- Costello syndrome; 218040; HRAS
- Coumarin resistance; 122700; CYP2A6
- Cousin syndrome; 260660; TBX15
- Cowden syndrome; 158350; PTEN
- Cowden-like syndrome; 612359; SDHB
- Cowden-like syndrome; 612359; SDHD
- CPT deficiency, hepatic, type IA; 255120; CPT1A
- CPT deficiency, hepatic, type II; 600649; CPT2
- CPT II deficiency, lethal neonatal; 608836; CPT2
- Cranioectodermal dysplasia; 218330; IFT122
- Craniofacial-deafness-hand syndrome; 122880; PAX3
- Craniofrontonasal dysplasia; 304110; EFNB1
- Cranio-lenticulo-sutural dysplasia; 607812; SEC23A
- Craniometaphyseal dysplasia; 123000; ANKH
- Cranioosteoarthropathy; 259100; HPGD
- Craniosynostosis, type 1; 123100; TWIST1
- Craniosynostosis, type 2; 604757; MSX2
- CRASH syndrome; 303350; L1CAM
- Creatine deficiency syndrome, X-linked; 300352; SLC6A8
- Creatine phosphokinase, elevated serum; 123320; CAV3
- Creutzfeldt–Jakob disease; 123400; PRNP
- Crigler–Najjar syndrome type I; 218800; UGT1A1
- Crigler–Najjar syndrome type II; 606785; UGT1A1
- Crisponi syndrome; 601378; CRLF1
- Crouzon syndrome with acanthosis nigricans; 612247; FGFR3
- Crouzon syndrome; 123500; FGFR2
- Cryptorchidism, bilateral; 219050; LGR8
- Cryptorchidism, idiopathic; 219050; INSL3
- Currarino syndrome; 176450; MNX1
- Cutis laxa with severe pulmonary, gastrointestinal, and urinary abnormalities; 613177; LTBP4
- Cutis laxa, AD; 123700; ELN
- Cutis laxa, autosomal dominant; 123700; FBLN5
- Cutis laxa, autosomal recessive; 219100; FBLN5
- Cutis laxa, autosomal recessive, type I; 219100; EFEMP2
- Cutis laxa, autosomal recessive, type II; 219200; ATP6V0A2
- Cutis laxa, autosomal recessive, type IIB; 612940; PYCR1
- Cutis laxa, recessive, type I; 219100; LOX
- Cylindromatosis, familial; 132700; CYLD1
- Cystathioninuria; 219500; CTH
- Cystic fibrosis; 219700; CFTR
- Cystinosis, late-onset juvenile or adolescent nephropathic; 219900; CTNS
- Cystinosis, nephropathic; 219800; CTNS
- Cystinosis, ocular nonnephropathic; 219750; CTNS
- Cystinuria; 220100; SLC3A1
- Cystinuria; 220100; SLC7A9
- Cytochrome C oxidase deficiency; 220110; COX6B1
- D-2-hydroxyglutaric aciduria; 600721; D2HGDH
- Dandy–Walker malformation; 220200; ZIC1
- Dandy–Walker malformation; 220200; ZIC4
- Darier disease; 124200; ATP2A2
- Darsun syndrome; 612541; G6PC3
- D-bifunctional protein deficiency; 261515; HSD17B4
- De la Chapelle dysplasia; 256050; SLC26A2
- De Sanctis–Cacchione syndrome; 278800; ERCC6
- Deafness, autosomal dominant 1; 124900; DIAPH1
- Deafness, autosomal dominant 10; 601316; EYA4
- Deafness, autosomal dominant 11, neurosensory; 601317; MYO7A
- Deafness, autosomal dominant 13; 601868; COL11A2
- Deafness, autosomal dominant 15; 602459; POU4F3
- Deafness, autosomal dominant 17; 603622; MYH9
- Deafness, autosomal dominant 20/26; 604717; ACTG1
- Deafness, autosomal dominant 22; 606346; MYO6
- Deafness, autosomal dominant 23; 605192; SIX1
- Deafness, autosomal dominant 25; 605583; SLC17A8
- Deafness, autosomal dominant 28; 608641; GRHL2
- Deafness, autosomal dominant 2A; 600101; KCNQ4
- Deafness, autosomal dominant 2B; 612644; GJB3
- Deafness, autosomal dominant 36; 606705; TMC1
- Deafness, autosomal dominant 36, with dentinogenesis; 605594; DSPP
- Deafness, autosomal dominant 3A; 601544; GJB2
- Deafness, autosomal dominant 3B; 612643; GJB6
- Deafness, autosomal dominant 4; 600652; MYH14
- Deafness, autosomal dominant 44; 607453; CCDC50
- Deafness, autosomal dominant 48; 607841; MYO1A
- Deafness, autosomal dominant 5; 600994; DFNA5
- Deafness, autosomal dominant 50; 613074; MIR96
- Deafness, autosomal dominant 8/12; 601543; TECTA
- Deafness, autosomal dominant 9; 601369; COCH
- Deafness, autosomal recessive 10, congenital; 605316; TMPRSS3
- Deafness, autosomal recessive 12; 601386; CDH23
- Deafness, autosomal recessive 16; 603720; STRC
- Deafness, autosomal recessive 18; 602092; USH1C
- Deafness, autosomal recessive 1A; 220290; GJB2
- Deafness, autosomal recessive 1B; 612645; GJB6
- Deafness, autosomal recessive 2, neurosensory; 600060; MYO7A
- Deafness, autosomal recessive 21; 603629; TECTA
- Deafness, autosomal recessive 22; 607039; OTOA
- Deafness, autosomal recessive 23; 609533; PCDH15
- Deafness, autosomal recessive 25; 613285; GRXCR1
- Deafness, autosomal recessive 28; 609823; TRIOBP
- Deafness, autosomal recessive 3; 600316; MYO15A
- Deafness, autosomal recessive 30; 607101; MYO3A
- Deafness, autosomal recessive 31; 607084; WHRN
- Deafness, autosomal recessive 35; 608565; ESRRB
- Deafness, autosomal recessive 36; 609006; ESPN
- Deafness, autosomal recessive 37; 607821; MYO6
- Deafness, autosomal recessive 39; 608265; HGF
- Deafness, autosomal recessive 49; 610153; MARVELD2
- Deafness, autosomal recessive 53; 609706; COL11A2
- Deafness, autosomal recessive 59; 610220; PJVK
- Deafness, autosomal recessive 6; 600971; TMIE
- Deafness, autosomal recessive 63; 611451; LRTOMT
- Deafness, autosomal recessive 67; 610265; LHFPL5
- Deafness, autosomal recessive 7; 600974; TMC1
- Deafness, autosomal recessive 77; 613079; LOXHD1
- Deafness, autosomal recessive 79; 613307; TPRN
- Deafness, autosomal recessive 8, childhood onset; 601072; TMPRSS3
- Deafness, autosomal recessive 84; 613391; PTPRQ
- Deafness, autosomal recessive 9; 601071; OTOF
- Deafness, autosomal recessive 91; 613453; SERPINB6
- Deafness, autosomal recessive, 24; 611022; RDX
- Deafness, congenital with inner ear agenesis, microtia, and microdontia; 610706; FGF3
- Deafness, digenic GJB2/GJB6; 220290; GJB6
- Deafness, digenic, GJB2/GJB3; 220290; GJB3
- Deafness, sensorineural, with hypertrophic cardiomyopathy; 606346; MYO6
- Deafness, X-linked 1; 304500; PRPS1
- Deafness, X-linked 2; 304400; POU3F4
- Dehydrated hereditary stomatocytosis, pseudohyperkalemia, and perinatal edema; 603528; PIEZO1
- Dejerine–Sottas disease; 145900; PMP22
- Dejerine–Sottas neuropathy; 145900; EGR2
- Dejerine–Sottas neuropathy, autosomal recessive; 145900; PRX
- Dejerine–Sottas syndrome; 145900; MPZ
- Dementia, familial British; 176500; ITM2B
- Dementia, familial Danish; 117300; ITM2B
- Dementia, familial, nonspecific; 600795; CHMP2B
- Dementia, frontotemporal; 600274; PSEN1
- Dementia, frontotemporal, with or without parkinsonism; 600274; MAPT
- Dementia, Lewy body; 127750; SNCA
- Dementia, Lewy body; 127750; SNCB
- Dent's disease 2; 300555; OCRL
- Dent's disease; 300009; CLCN5
- Dentatorubr–pallidoluysian atrophy; 125370; ATN1
- Dentin dysplasia, type II; 125420; DSPP
- Dentinogenesis imperfecta, Shields type II; 125490; DSPP
- Dentinogenesis imperfecta, Shields type III; 125500; DSPP
- Denys–Drash syndrome; 194080; WT1
- Dermatopathia pigmentosa reticularis; 125595; KRT14
- Desbuquois dysplasia; 251450; CANT1
- Desmoid disease, hereditary; 135290; APC
- Desmosterolosis; 602398; DHCR24
- Diabetes insipidus, nephrogenic; 125800; AQP2
- Diabetes insipidus, nephrogenic; 304800; AVPR2
- Diabetes insipidus, neurohypophyseal; 125700; AVP
- Diabetes mellitus, gestational; 125851; GCK
- Diabetes mellitus, insulin-dependent, 2; 125852; INS
- Diabetes mellitus, insulin-dependent, 20; 612520; HNF1A
- Diabetes mellitus, insulin-resistant, with acanthosis nigricans; 610549; INSR
- Diabetes mellitus, ketosis-prone; 612227; PAX4
- Diabetes mellitus, neonatal, with congenital hypothyroidism; 610199; GLIS3
- Diabetes mellitus, noninsulin-dependent; 125853; ABCC8
- Diabetes mellitus, noninsulin-dependent; 125853; HNF1B
- Diabetes mellitus, noninsulin-dependent, late onset; 125853; GCK
- Diabetes mellitus, permanent neonatal; 606176; ABCC8
- Diabetes mellitus, permanent neonatal; 606176; GCK
- Diabetes mellitus, permanent neonatal; 606176; INS
- Diabetes mellitus, permanent neonatal, with cerebellar agenesis; 609069; PTF1A
- Diabetes mellitus, permanent neonatal, with neurologic features; 606176; KCNJ11
- Diabetes mellitus, transient neonatal 2; 610374; ABCC8
- Diabetes mellitus, transient neonatal, 1; 601410; ZFP57
- Diabetes mellitus, transient neonatal, 3; 610582; KCNJ11
- Diabetes mellitus, type 1; 125852; INS
- Diabetes mellitus, type 2; 125853; PAX4
- Diabetes mellitus type II; 125853; AKT2
- Diabetes, permanent neonatal; 606176; KCNJ11
- Diamond–Blackfan anemia 1; 105650; RPS19
- Diamond–Blackfan anemia 10; 613309; RPS26
- Diamond-Blackfan anemia 4; 612527; RPS17
- Diamond–Blackfan anemia 5; 612528; RPL35A
- Diamond–Blackfan anemia 6; 612561; RPL5
- Diamond–Blackfan anemia 7; 612562; RPL11
- Diamond–Blackfan anemia 8; 612563; RPS7
- Diamond–Blackfan anemia 9; 613308; RPS10
- Diamond–Blackfan anemia; 610629; RPS24
- Diaphragmatic hernia 3; 610187; ZFPM2
- Diarrhea 3, secretory sodium, congenital, syndromic; 270420; SPINT2
- Diarrhea 4, malabsorptive, congenital; 610370; NEUROG3
- Diarrhea 5, with tufting enteropathy, congenital; 613217; EPCAM
- Diastrophic dysplasia; 222600; SLC26A2
- Diastrophic dysplasia, broad bone-platyspondylic variant; 222600; SLC26A2
- Dicarboxylic aminoaciduria; 222730; SLC1A1
- DiGeorge syndrome; 188400; TBX1
- Digital clubbing, isolated congenital; 119900; HPGD
- Dihydropyrimidine dehydrogenase deficiency; 274270; DPYD
- Dihydropyrimidinuria; 222748; DPYS
- Dilated cardiomyopathy with woolly hair and keratoderma; 605676; DSP
- Dimethylglycine dehydrogenase deficiency; 605850; DMGDH
- Disordered steroidogenesis, isolated; 201750; POR
- Donnai–Barrow syndrome; 222448; LRP2
- Dopamine beta-hydroxylase deficiency; 223360; DBH
- Dosage-sensitive sex reversal; 300018; DAX1
- Double outlet right ventricle; 217095; CFC1
- Double outlet right ventricle; 217095; GDF1
- Dowling–Degos disease; 179850; KRT5
- Doyne honeycomb degeneration of retina; 126600; EFEMP1
- Dravet syndrome; 607208; SCN1A
- Duane retraction syndrome 2; 604356; CHN1
- Duane-radial ray syndrome; 607323; SALL4
- Dubin–Johnson syndrome; 237500; ABCC2
- Duchenne muscular dystrophy; 310200; DMD
- Dyggve–Melchior–Clausen disease; 223800; DYM
- Dysautonomia, familial; 223900; IKBKAP
- Dyschromatosis symmetrica hereditaria; 127400; ADAR
- Dyserythropoietic anemia with thrombocytopenia; 300367; GATA1
- Dyskeratosis congenita; 127550; TERT
- Dyskeratosis congenita; 224230; NOLA2
- Dyskeratosis congenita, autosomal dominant; 127550; TERC
- Dyskeratosis congenita, autosomal dominant; 127550; TINF2
- Dyskeratosis congenita, autosomal recessive; 224230; NOLA3
- Dyskeratosis congenita-1; 305000; DKC1
- Dyssegmental dysplasia, Silverman-Handmaker type; 224410; HSPG2
- Dystonia 16; 612067; PRKRA
- Dystonia 6, torsion; 602629; THAP1
- Dystonia, dopa-responsive, due to sepiapterin reductase deficiency; 612716; SPR
- Dystonia, DOPA-responsive, with or without hyperphenylalainemia; 233910; GCH1
- Dystonia, juvenile-onset; 607371; ACTB
- Dystonia, myoclonic; 159900; DRD2
- Dystonia-1, torsion; 128100; DYT1
- Dystonia-11, myoclonic; 159900; SGCE
- Dystonia-12; 128235; ATP1A3
- Dystonia-parkinsonism, adult-onset; 612953; PLA2G6
- Dystonia-Parkinsonism, X-linked; 314250; TAF1
- EBD inversa; 226600; COL7A1
- EBD, Bart type; 132000; COL7A1
- Ectodermal dysplasia, anhidrotic, autosomal dominant; 129490; EDARADD
- Ectodermal dysplasia, anhidrotic, autosomal recessive; 224900; EDARADD
- Ectodermal dysplasia, anhidrotic, with T-cell immunodeficiency; 612132; NFKBIA
- Ectodermal dysplasia, anhidrotic, X-linked; 305100; ED1
- Ectodermal dysplasia, ectrodactyly, and macular dystrophy; 225280; CDH3
- Ectodermal dysplasia, hidrotic; 129500; GJB6
- Ectodermal dysplasia, hypohidrotic, autosomal dominant; 129490; EDAR
- Ectodermal dysplasia, hypohidrotic, autosomal recessive; 224900; EDAR
- Ectodermal dysplasia, hypohidrotic, with immune deficiency; 300291; IKBKG
- Ectodermal dysplasia, 'pure' hair-nail type; 602032; KRT85
- Ectodermal dysplasia-skin fragility syndrome; 604536; PKP1
- Ectodermal dysplasia-syndactyly syndrome 1; 613573; PVRL4
- Ectodermal, dysplasia, anhidrotic, lymphedema and immunodeficiency; 300301; IKBKG
- Ectopia lentis, familial; 129600; FBN1
- Ectopia lentis, isolated, autosomal recessive; 225100; ADAMTSL4
- Ectrodactyly, ectodermal dysplasia, and cleft lip/palate syndrome 3; 604292; TP63
- Ehlers–Danlos due to tenascin X deficiency; 606408; TNXB
- Ehlers–Danlos syndrome, cardiac valvular form; 225320; COL1A2
- Ehlers–Danlos syndrome, hypermobility type; 130020; TNXB
- Ehlers-Danlos syndrome, musculocontractural type; 601776; CHST14
- Ehlers–Danlos syndrome, progeroid form; 130070; B4GALT7
- Ehlers–Danlos syndrome, type I; 130000; COL1A1
- Ehlers–Danlos syndrome, type I; 130000; COL5A1
- Ehlers–Danlos syndrome, type I; 130000; COL5A2
- Ehlers–Danlos syndrome, type II; 130010; COL5A1
- Ehlers–Danlos syndrome, type III; 130020; COL3A1
- Ehlers–Danlos syndrome, type IV; 130050; COL3A1
- Ehlers–Danlos syndrome, type VI; 225400; PLOD1
- Ehlers–Danlos syndrome, type VIIA; 130060; COL1A1
- Ehlers–Danlos syndrome, type VIIB; 130060; COL1A2
- Ehlers–Danlos syndrome, type VIIC; 225410; ADAMTS2
- Eiken syndrome; 600002; PTHR1
- Elliptocytosis-1; 611804; EPB41
- Elliptocytosis-2; 130600; SPTA1
- Ellis–van Creveld syndrome; 225500; EVC
- Ellis–van Creveld syndrome; 225500; LBN
- Emery–Dreifuss muscular dystrophy 4; 612998; SYNE1
- Emery–Dreifuss muscular dystrophy 5; 612999; SYNE2
- Emery–Dreifuss muscular dystrophy 6; 300696; FHL1
- Emery–Dreifuss muscular dystrophy; 310300; EMD
- Emery–Dreifuss muscular dystrophy, AD; 181350; LMNA
- Emery–Dreifuss muscular dystrophy, AR; 181350; LMNA
- Emphysema due to AAT deficiency; 613490; SERPINA1
- Emphysema-cirrhosis, due to AAT deficiency; 613490; SERPINA1
- Encephalocardiomyopathy, neonatal, mitochondrial, due to ATP synthase deficiency; 604273; TMEM70
- Encephalopathy, familial, with neuroserpin inclusion bodies; 604218; SERPINI1
- Encephalopathy, neonatal severe; 300673; MECP2
- Endocrine-cerebroosteodysplasia; 612651; ICK
- Endometrial cancer; 608089; MLH3
- Endometrial cancer, familial; 608089; MSH6
- Endplate acetylcholinesterase deficiency; 603034; COLQ
- Enhanced S-cone syndrome; 268100; NR2E3
- Enlarged vestibular aqueduct; 600791; FOXI1
- Enlarged vestibular aqueduct; 600791; SLC26A4
- Enterokinase deficiency; 226200; PRSS7
- Eosinophil peroxidase deficiency; 261500; EPX
- Epidermodysplasia verruciformis; 226400; TMC6
- Epidermodysplasia verruciformis; 226400; TMC8
- Epidermolysis bullosa dystrophica, AD; 131750; COL7A1
- Epidermolysis bullosa dystrophica, AR; 226600; COL7A1
- Epidermolysis bullosa of hands and feet; 131800; ITGB4
- Epidermolysis bullosa pruriginosa; 604129; COL7A1
- Epidermolysis bullosa simplex with migratory circinate erythema; 609352; KRT5
- Epidermolysis bullosa simplex with mottled pigmentation; 131960; KRT5
- Epidermolysis bullosa simplex with pyloric atresia; 612138; PLEC1
- Epidermolysis bullosa simplex, Dowling-Meara type; 131760; KRT14
- Epidermolysis bullosa simplex, Dowling-Meara type; 131760; KRT5
- Epidermolysis bullosa simplex, Koebner type; 131900; KRT14
- Epidermolysis bullosa simplex, Koebner type; 131900; KRT5
- Epidermolysis bullosa simplex, Ogna type; 131950; PLEC1
- Epidermolysis bullosa simplex, recessive; 601001; KRT14
- Epidermolysis bullosa simplex, Weber-Cockayne type; 131800; KRT14
- Epidermolysis bullosa simplex, Weber-Cockayne type; 131800; KRT5
- Epidermolysis bullosa, generalized atrophic benign; 226650; LAMA3
- Epidermolysis bullosa, junctional, Herlitz type; 226700; LAMA3
- Epidermolysis bullosa, junctional, Herlitz type; 226700; LAMB3
- Epidermolysis bullosa, junctional, Herlitz type; 226700; LAMC2
- Epidermolysis bullosa, junctional, non-Herlitz type; 226650; COL17A1
- Epidermolysis bullosa, junctional, non-Herlitz type; 226650; ITGB4
- Epidermolysis bullosa, junctional, non-Herlitz type; 226650; LAMB3
- Epidermolysis bullosa, junctional, non-Herlitz type; 226650; LAMC2
- Epidermolysis bullosa, junctional, with pyloric atresia; 226730; ITGB4
- Epidermolysis bullosa, junctional, with pyloric stenosis; 226730; ITGA6
- Epidermolysis bullosa, lethal acantholytic; 609638; DSP
- Epidermolysis bullosa, pretibial; 131850; COL7A1
- Epidermolytic hyperkeratosis; 113800; KRT1
- Epidermolytic hyperkeratosis; 113800; KRT10
- Epidermolytic palmoplantar keratoderma; 144200; KRT9
- Epilepsy, benign neonatal, type 2; 121201; KCNQ3
- Epilepsy, benign, neonatal, type 1; 121200; KCNQ2
- Epilepsy, female-restricted, with mental retardation; 300088; PCDH19
- Epilepsy, generalized, with febrile seizures plus, type 2; 604233; SCN1A
- Epilepsy, generalized, with febrile seizures plus, type 3; 604233; GABRG2
- Epilepsy, juvenile myoclonic, susceptibility to; 613060; GABRD
- Epilepsy, myoclonic, Lafora type; 254780; EPM2A
- Epilepsy, myoclonic, Lafora type; 254780; NHLRC1
- Epilepsy, myoclonic, with mental retardation and spasticity; 300432; ARX
- Epilepsy, neonatal myoclonic, with suppression-burst pattern; 609304; SLC25A22
- Epilepsy, nocturnal frontal lobe, 1; 600513; CHRNA4
- Epilepsy, nocturnal frontal lobe, 3; 605375; CHRNB2
- Epilepsy, nocturnal frontal lobe, type 4; 610353; CHRNA2
- Epilepsy, partial, with auditory features; 600512; LGI1
- Epilepsy, progressive myoclonic 1; 254800; CSTB
- Epilepsy, progressive myoclonic 1B; 612437; PRICKLE1
- Epilepsy, progressive myoclonic 2B; 254780; NHLRC1
- Epilepsy, progressive myoclonic 3; 611726; KCTD7
- Epilepsy, pyridoxine-dependent; 266100; ALDH7A1
- Epilepsy, severe myoclonic, of infancy; 607208; SCN1A
- Epilepsy, X-linked, with variable learning disabilities and behavior disorders; 300491; SYN1
- Epileptic encephalopathy, early infantile, 1; 308350; ARX
- Epileptic encephalopathy, early infantile, 2; 300672; CDKL5
- Epileptic encephalopathy, early infantile, 4; 612164; STXBP1
- Epileptic encephalopathy, early infantile, 5; 613477; SPTAN1
- Epileptic encephalopathy, Lennox-Gastaut type; 606369; MAPK10
- Epiphyseal dysplasia, multiple 1; 132400; COMP
- Epiphyseal dysplasia, multiple, 2; 600204; COL9A2
- Epiphyseal dysplasia, multiple, 3; 600969; COL9A3
- Epiphyseal dysplasia, multiple, 4; 226900; SLC26A2
- Epiphyseal dysplasia, multiple, 5; 607078; MATN3
- Epiphyseal dysplasia, multiple, with myopia and deafness; 132450; COL2A1
- Episodic ataxia, type 2; 108500; CACNA1A
- Episodic ataxia, type 6; 612656; SLC1A3
- Episodic ataxia/myokymia syndrome; 160120; KCNA1
- Epstein syndrome; 153650; MYH9
- Erythermalgia, primary; 133020; SCN9A
- Erythrocyte lactate transporter defect; 245340; SLC16A1
- Erythrocytosis, familial, 3; 609820; EGLN1
- Erythrocytosis, familial, 4; 611783; EPAS1
- Erythrokeratodermia variabilis et progressiva; 133200; GJB3
- Erythrokeratodermia variabilis with erythema gyratum repens; 133200; GJB4
- Escobar syndrome; 265000; CHRNG
- Esophageal cancer; 133239; DLEC1
- Esophageal cancer, somatic; 133239; TGFBR2
- Esophageal carcinoma, somatic; 133239; RNF6
- Esophageal squamous cell carcinoma; 133239; 40513
- Esophageal squamous cell carcinoma; 133239; LZTS1
- Esophageal squamous cell carcinoma; 133239; WWOX
- Ethylmalonic encephalopathy; 602473; ETHE1
- Ewing sarcoma; 612219; EWSR1
- Exocrine pancreatic insufficiency, dyserythropoietic anemia, and calvarial hyperostosis; 612714; COX4I2
- Exostoses, multiple, type 1; 133700; EXT1
- Exostoses, multiple, type 2; 133701; EXT2
- Exudative vitreoretinopathy 4; 601813; LRP5
- Exudative vitreoretinopathy 5; 613310; TSPAN12
- Exudative vitreoretinopathy; 133780; FZD4
- Exudative vitreoretinopathy, X-linked; 305390; NDP
- Fabry disease; 301500; GLA
- Fabry disease, cardiac variant; 301500; GLA
- Factor V and factor VIII, combined deficiency of; 227300; MCFD2
- Factor V deficiency; 227400; F5
- Factor XI deficiency, autosomal dominant; 612416; F11
- Factor XI deficiency, autosomal recessive; 612416; F11
- Factor XII deficiency; 234000; F12
- Factor XIIIA deficiency; 613225; F13A1
- Factor XIIIB deficiency; 613235; F13B
- Failure of tooth eruption, primary; 125350; PTHR1
- Familial cold autoinflammatory syndrome 2; 611762; NALP12
- Familial Mediterranean fever, AD; 134610; MEFV
- Familial Mediterranean fever, AR; 249100; MEFV
- Fanconi anemia, complementation group 0; 613390; RAD51C
- Fanconi anemia, complementation group A; 227650; FANCA
- Fanconi anemia, complementation group B; 300514; FAAP95
- Fanconi anemia, complementation group D1; 605724; BRCA2
- Fanconi anemia, complementation group I; 609053; FANCI
- Fanconi anemia, complementation group J; 609054; BRIP1
- Fanconi anemia, complementation group N; 610832; PALB2
- Fanconi renotubular syndrome 2; 613388; SLC34A1
- Fanconi–Bickel syndrome; 227810; SLC2A2
- Farber lipogranulomatosis; 228000; ASAH1
- Fatty liver, acute, of pregnancy; 609016; HADHA
- Febrile convulsions, familial, 3A; 604403; SCN1A
- Febrile convulsions, familial, 3B; 604403; SCN9A
- Febrilel, convulsions, familial; 611277; GABRG2
- Fechtner syndrome; 153640; MYH9
- Feingold syndrome; 164280; MYCN
- Fertile eunuch syndrome; 228300; GNRHR
- Fetal akinesia deformation sequence; 208150; DOK7
- Fetal akinesia deformation sequence; 208150; RAPSN
- Fetal hemoglobin quantitative trait locus 1; 141749; HBG1
- Fetal hemoglobin quantitative trait locus 1; 141749; HBG2
- FG syndrome 2; 300321; FLNA
- FG syndrome 4; 300422; CASK
- Fibrodysplasia ossificans progressiva; 135100; ACVR1
- Fibromatosis, gingival; 135300; SOS1
- Fibromatosis, gingival, 2; 135300; GINGF2 (non-gene locus)
- Fibromatosis, juvenile hyaline; 228600; ANTXR2
- Fibrosis of extraocular muscles, congenital, 1; 135700; KIF21A
- Fibrosis of extraocular muscles, congenital, 2; 602078; PHOX2A
- Fibrosis of extraocular muscles, congenital, 3A; 600638; TUBB3
- Fibrosis of extraocular muscles, congenital, 3B; 135700; KIF21A
- Fibular hypoplasia and complex brachydactyly; 228900; GDF5
- Fish-eye disease; 136120; LCAT
- Fletcher factor deficiency; 612423; KLKB1
- Focal cortical dysplasia, Taylor balloon cell type; 607341; TSC1
- Focal dermal hypoplasia; 305600; PORCN
- Folate malabsorption, hereditary; 229050; SLC46A1
- Follicle-stimulating hormone deficiency, isolated; 229070; FSHB
- Foveal hyperplasia; 136520; PAX6
- Foveomacular dystrophy, adult-onset, with choroidal neovascularization; 608161; PRPH2
- Fragile X syndrome; 300624; FMR1
- Fragile X tremor/ataxia syndrome; 300623; FMR1
- Frank–ter Haar syndrome; 249420; SH3PXD2B
- Fraser syndrome; 219000; FRAS1
- Fraser syndrome; 219000; FREM2
- Frasier syndrome; 136680; WT1
- Friedreich's ataxia with retained reflexes; 229300; FXN
- Friedreich's ataxia; 229300; FXN
- Frontometaphyseal dysplasia; 305620; FLNA
- Frontonasal dysplasia 2; 613451; ALX4
- Frontonasal dysplasia 3; 613456; ALX1
- Frontorhiny; 136760; ALX3
- Frontotemporal lobar degeneration with ubiquitin-positive inclusions; 607485; GRN
- Frontotemporal lobar degeneration, TARDBP-related; 612069; TARDBP
- Fructose intolerance; 229600; ALDOB
- Fructose-1,6-bisphosphatase deficiency; 229700; FBP1
- Fucosidosis; 230000; FUCA1
- Fuhrmann syndrome; 228930; WNT7A
- Fumarase deficiency; 606812; FH
- Fundus albipunctatus; 136880; RDH5
- Fundus albipunctatus; 136880; RLBP1
- Fundus flavimaculatus; 248200; ABCA4
- GABA-transaminase deficiency; 613163; ABAT
- Galactokinase deficiency with cataracts; 230200; GALK1
- Galactose epimerase deficiency; 230350; GALE
- Galactosemia; 230400; GALT
- Galactosialidosis; 256540; CTSA
- Gallbladder disease 1; 600803; ABCB4
- Gallbladder disease 4; 611465; ABCG8
- GAMT deficiency; 612736; GAMT
- Gastric cancer, familial diffuse; 137215; CDH1
- Gastric cancer, somatic; 137215; APC
- Gastric cancer, somatic; 137215; CASP10
- Gastric cancer, somatic; 137215; ERBB2
- Gastric cancer, somatic; 137215; FGFR2
- Gastric cancer, somatic; 137215; IRF1
- Gastric cancer, somatic; 137215; KLF6
- Gastric cancer, somatic; 137215; MUTYH
- Gastric cancer, somatic; 137215; PIK3CA
- Gastrointestinal stromal tumor, somatic; 606764; KIT
- Gastrointestinal stromal tumor, somatic; 606764; PDGFRA
- Gaucher disease, atypical; 610539; PSAP
- Gaucher disease, perinatal lethal; 608013; GBA
- Gaucher disease, type; 230800; GBA
- Gaucher disease, type II; 230900; GBA
- Gaucher disease, type III; 231000; GBA
- Gaucher disease, type IIIC; 231005; GBA
- Gaze palsy, horizontal, with progressive scoliosis; 607313; ROBO3
- Geleophysic dysplasia; 231050; ADAMTSL2
- Generalized epilepsy and paroxysmal dyskinesia; 609446; KCNMA1
- Generalized epilepsy with febrile seizures plus; 604233; SCN1B
- Germ cell tumors; 273300; KIT
- Geroderma osteodysplasticum; 231070; SCYL1BP1
- Gerstmann–Sträussler–Scheinker syndrome; 137440; PRNP
- Ghosal syndrome; 231095; TBXAS1
- Giant axonal neuropathy-1; 256850; GAN
- Gillespie syndrome; 206700; PAX6
- Gitelman syndrome; 263800; SLC12A3
- Glanzmann thrombasthenia, type A; 273800; ITGA2B
- Glaucoma 1, open angle, 1O; 613100; NTF4
- Glaucoma 1, open angle, E; 137760; OPTN
- Glaucoma 1, open angle, G; 609887; WDR36
- Glaucoma 1A, primary open angle, juvenile-onset; 137750; MYOC
- Glaucoma 1B, primary open angle, adult onset; 137760; GLC1B (non-gene locus)
- Glaucoma 3, primary congenital, D; 613086; LTBP2
- Glaucoma 3A, primary congenital; 231300; CYP1B1
- Glaucoma, primary open angle, adult-onset; 137760; CYP1B1
- Glaucoma, primary open angle, juvenile-onset; 137750; CYP1B1
- Glioblastoma, somatic; 137800; ERBB2
- Globozoospermia; 102530; GOPC
- Globozoospermia; 102530; SPATA16
- Glomerulocystic kidney disease with hyperuricemia and isosthenuria; 609886; UMOD
- Glomerulopathy with fibronectin deposits 2; 601894; FN1
- Glomerulosclerosis, focal segmental, 1; 603278; ACTN4
- Glomerulosclerosis, focal segmental, 2; 603965; TRPC6
- Glomerulosclerosis, focal segmental, 3; 607832; CD2AP
- Glomerulosclerosis, focal segmental, 5; 613237; INF2
- Glomuvenous malformations; 138000; GLML
- Glucocorticoid deficiency 2; 607398; MRAP
- Glucocorticoid deficiency, due to ACTH unresponsiveness; 202200; MC2R
- Glucose-galactose malabsorption; 606824; SLC5A1
- GLUT1 deficiency syndrome 1; 606777; SLC2A1
- GLUT1 deficiency syndrome 2; 612126; SLC2A1
- Glutamate formiminotransferase deficiency; 229100; FTCD
- Glutamine deficiency, congenital; 610015; GLUL
- Glutaricaciduria, type I; 231670; GCDH
- Glutaricaciduria, type IIA; 231680; ETFA
- Glutaricaciduria, type IIB; 231680; ETFB
- Glutaricaciduria, type IIC; 231680; ETFDH
- Glutathione synthetase deficiency; 266130; GSS
- Glycerol kinase deficiency; 307030; GK
- Glycine encephalopathy; 605899; AMT
- Glycine encephalopathy; 605899; GCSH
- Glycine encephalopathy; 605899; GLDC
- Glycine N-methyltransferase deficiency; 606664; GNMT
- Glycogen storage disease 0, muscle; 611556; GYS1
- Glycogen storage disease Ib; 232220; SLC37A4
- Glycogen storage disease Ic; 232240; SLC37A4
- Glycogen storage disease Ic; 232240; SLC17A3
- Glycogen storage disease II; 232300; GAA
- Glycogen storage disease IIb; 300257; LAMP2
- Glycogen storage disease IIIa; 232400; AGL
- Glycogen storage disease IIIb; 232400; AGL
- Glycogen storage disease IV; 232500; GBE1
- Glycogen storage disease IXc; 613027; PHKG2
- Glycogen storage disease of heart, lethal congenital; 261740; PRKAG2
- Glycogen storage disease VII; 232800; PFKM
- Glycogen storage disease X; 261670; PGAM2
- Glycogen storage disease XI; 612933; LDHA
- Glycogen storage disease XII; 611881; ALDOA
- Glycogen storage disease XIII; 612932; ENO3
- Glycogen storage disease XIV; 612934; PGM1
- Glycogen storage disease XV; 613507; GYG1
- Glycogen storage disease type 0; 240600; GYS2
- Glycogen storage disease, type IXa1; 306000; PHKA2
- Glycogen storage disease, type IXa2; 306000; PHKA2
- Glycosylphosphatidylinositol deficiency; 610293; PIGM
- GM1-gangliosidosis, type I; 230500; GLB1
- GM1-gangliosidosis, type II; 230600; GLB1
- GM1-gangliosidosis, type III; 230650; GLB1
- GM2-gangliosidosis, AB variant; 272750; GM2A
- GM2-gangliosidosis, several forms; 272800; HEXA
- Gnathodiaphyseal dysplasia; 166260; ANO5
- Goldberg–Shpritzen megacolon syndrome; 609460; KIAA1279
- Gout, PRPS-related; 300661; PRPS1
- GRACILE syndrome; 603358; BCS1L
- Greenberg dysplasia; 215140; LBR
- Greig cephalopolysyndactyly syndrome; 175700; GLI3
- Griscelli syndrome type 1; 214450; MYO5A
- Griscelli syndrome type 2; 607624; RAB27A
- Griscelli syndrome type 3; 609227; MLPH
- Growth hormone deficiency with pituitary anomalies; 182230; HESX1
- Growth hormone deficiency, isolated, type IA; 262400; GH1
- Growth hormone deficiency, isolated, type IB; 612781; GH1
- Growth hormone deficiency, isolated, type IB; 612781; GHRHR
- Growth hormone deficiency, isolated, type II; 173100; GH1
- Growth hormone insensitivity with immunodeficiency; 245590; STAT5B
- Growth retardation with deafness and mental retardation due to IGF1 deficiency; 608747; IGF1
- Growth retardation, developmental delay, coarse facies, and early death; 612938; FTO
- Guttmacher syndrome; 176305; HOXA13
- Gyrate atrophy of choroid and retina with or without ornithinemia; 258870; OAT
- Haddad syndrome; 209880; ASCL1
- Hailey–Hailey disease; 169600; ATP2C1
- Haim–Munk syndrome; 245010; CTSC
- Hallermann–Streiff syndrome; 234100; GJA1
- Hand-foot-uterus Syndrome; 140000; HOXA13
- Harderoporphyria; 121300; CPOX
- HARP syndrome; 607236; PANK2
- Hartnup disorder; 234500; SLC6A19
- Hawkinsinuria; 140350; HPD
- Hay–Wells syndrome; 106260; TP63
- HDL deficiency, type 2; 604091; ABCA1
- Hearing loss, low-frequency sensorineural; 600965; WFS1
- Heart block, nonprogressive; 113900; SCN5A
- Heart block, progressive, type IA; 113900; SCN5A
- Heinz body anemia; 140700; HBA2
- Heinz body anemias, alpha-; 140700; HBA1
- Heinz body anemias, beta-; 140700; HBB
- HELLP syndrome, maternal, of pregnancy; 609016; HADHA
- Hemangioma, capillary infantile, somatic; 602089; FLT4
- Hemangioma, capillary infantile, somatic; 602089; KDR
- Hematopoiesis, cyclic; 162800; ELANE
- Hematuria, benign familial; 141200; COL4A3
- Hemiplegic migraine, familial; 141500; CACNA1A
- Hemochromatosis, type 2A; 602390; HJV
- Hemochromatosis, type 2B; 613313; HAMP
- Hemochromatosis, type 3; 604250; TFR2
- Hemochromatosis, type 4; 606069; SLC40A1
- Hemolytic anemia due to adenylate kinase deficiency; 612631; AK1
- Hemolytic anemia due to gamma-glutamylcysteine synthetase deficiency; 230450; GCLC
- Hemolytic anemia due to glutathione synthetase deficiency; 231900; GSS
- Hemolytic anemia due to hexokinase deficiency; 235700; HK1
- Hemolytic anemia, nonspherocytic, due to glucose phosphate isomerase deficiency; 613470; GPI
- Hemolytic uremic syndrome, atypical, susceptibility to, 1; 235400; HF1
- Hemophagocytic lymphohistiocytosis, familial, 2; 603553; PRF1
- Hemophagocytic lymphohistiocytosis, familial, 3; 608898; UNC13D
- Hemophagocytic lymphohistiocytosis, familial, 4; 603552; STX11
- Hemophilia B; 306900; F9
- Hemorrhagic diathesis due to \'antithrombin\' Pittsburgh; 613490; SERPINA1
- Hemosiderosis, systemic, due to aceruloplasminemia; 604290; CP
- Hennekam lymphangiectasia-lymphedema syndrome; 235510; CCBE1
- Hepatic adenoma; 142330; HNF1A
- Hepatic venoocclusive disease with immunodeficiency; 235550; SP110
- Hepatocellular cancer; 114550; PDGFRL
- Hepatocellular carcinoma; 114550; CTNNB1
- Hepatocellular carcinoma; 114550; TP53
- Hepatocellular carcinoma, childhood type; 114550; MET
- Hepatocellular carcinoma, somatic; 114550; AXIN1
- Hepatocellular carcinoma, somatic; 114550; CASP8
- Hepatocellular carcinoma, somatic; 114550; PIK3CA
- Hereditary hemorrhagic telangiectasia-1; 187300; ENG
- Hereditary hemorrhagic telangiectasia-2; 600376; ACVRL1
- Hereditary motor and sensory neuropathy VI; 601152; MFN2
- Hereditary motor and sensory neuropathy, type IIc; 606071; TRPV4
- Hermansky–Pudlak syndrome 1; 203300; HPS1
- Hermansky–Pudlak syndrome 2; 608233; AP3B1
- Hermansky–Pudlak syndrome 3; 203300; HPS3
- Hermansky–Pudlak syndrome 4; 203300; HPS4
- Hermansky–Pudlak syndrome 5; 203300; HPS5
- Hermansky–Pudlak syndrome 6; 203300; HPS6
- Hermansky–Pudlak syndrome 7; 203300; DTNBP1
- Hermansky–Pudlak syndrome 8; 203300; BLOC1S3
- Heterotaxy, visceral, 1, S-linke; 306955; ZIC3
- Heterotaxy, visceral, 2, autosomal; 605376; CFC1
- Heterotaxy, visceral, 5; 270100; NODAL
- Heterotopia, periventricular; 300049; FLNA
- Heterotopia, periventricular, ED variant; 300537; FLNA
- Hirschsprung's disease; 142623; GDNF
- Hirschsprung's disease; 142623; RET
- Hirschsprung disease, short-segment; 142623; PMX2B
- Histiocytoma, angiomatoid fibrous, somatic; 612160; CREB1
- HMG-CoA synthase-2 deficiency; 605911; HMGCS2
- Hodgkin's lymphoma; 236000; KLHDC8B
- Holocarboxylase synthetase deficiency; 253270; HLCS
- Holoprosencephaly-2; 157170; SIX3
- Holoprosencephaly-3; 142945; SHH
- Holoprosencephaly-4; 142946; TGIF
- Holoprosencephaly-5; 609637; ZIC2
- Holoprosencephaly-7; 610828; PTCH1
- Holoprosencephaly-9; 610829; GLI2
- Holt–Oram syndrome; 142900; TBX5
- Homocystinuria due to MTHFR deficiency; 236250; MTHFR
- Homocystinuria, B6-responsive and nonresponsive types; 236200; CBS
- Homocystinuria, cblD type, variant 1; 277410; C2orf25
- Homocystinuria-megaloblastic anemia, cbl E type; 236270; MTRR
- Hoyeraal–Hreidarsson syndrome; 300240; DKC1
- HPRT-related gout; 300323; HPRT1
- Huntington's disease; 143100; HTT
- Huntington disease-like 1; 603218; PRNP
- Huntington disease-like 2; 606438; JPH3
- Hutchinson–Gilford progeria syndrome; 176670; LMNA
- Hyalinosis, infantile systemic; 236490; ANTXR2
- Hydatidiform mole; 231090; NALP7
- Hydranencephaly with abnormal genitalia; 300215; ARX
- Hydrocephalus due to aqueductal stenosis; 307000; L1CAM
- Hydrocephalus with congenital idiopathic intestinal pseudoobstruction; 307000; L1CAM
- Hydrocephalus with Hirschsprung disease and cleft palate; 142623; L1CAM
- Hydrolethalus syndrome; 236680; HYLS1
- Hyperalphalipoproteinemia; 143470; CETP
- Hyperbilirubinemia, familial transcient neonatal; 237900; UGT1A1
- Hypercarotenemia and vitamin A deficiency, autosomal dominant; 115300; BCMO1
- Hypercholanemia, familial; 607748; BAAT
- Hypercholanemia, familial; 607748; EPHX1
- Hypercholanemia, familial; 607748; TJP2
- Hypercholesterolemia, due to ligand-defective apo B; 144010; APOB
- Hypercholesterolemia, familial; 143890; LDLR
- Hypercholesterolemia, familial, 3; 603776; PCSK9
- Hypercholesterolemia, familial, autosomal recessive; 603813; LDLRAP1
- Hypercholesterolemia, familial, modification of; 143890; APOA2
- Hyperchylomicronemia, late-onset; 144650; APOA5
- Hyperekplexia and epilepsy; 300607; ARHGEF9
- Hyperekplexia; 149400; GPHN
- Hyperekplexia; 149400; SLC6A5
- Hyperekplexia, autosomal recessive; 149400; GLRB
- Hypereosinophilic syndrome, idiopathic, resistant to imatinib; 607685; PDGFRA
- Hyperferritinemia-cataract syndrome; 600886; FTL
- Hyperfibrinolysis, familial, due to increased release of PLAT; 612348; PLAT
- Hyperglycinuria; 138500; SLC36A2
- Hyperglycinuria; 138500; SLC6A19
- Hyperglycinuria; 138500; SLC6A20
- Hyper-IgD syndrome; 260920; MVK
- Hyper-IgE recurrent infection syndrome; 147060; STAT3
- Hyper-IgE recurrent infection syndrome, autosomal recessive; 243700; DOCK8
- Hyperinsulinemic hypoglycemia, familial, 1; 256450; ABCC8
- Hyperinsulinemic hypoglycemia, familial, 2; 601820; KCNJ11
- Hyperinsulinemic hypoglycemia, familial, 3; 602485; GCK
- Hyperinsulinemic hypoglycemia, familial, 4; 609975; HADHSC
- Hyperinsulinemic hypoglycemia, familial, 5; 609968; INSR
- Hyperinsulinemic hypoglycemia, familial, 7; 610021; SLC16A1
- Hyperinsulinism-hyperammonemia syndrome; 606762; GLUD1
- Hyperkalemic periodic paralysis, type 2; 613345; SCN4A
- Hyperkeratotic cutaneous capillary-venous malformations associated with cerebral capillary malformations; 116860; CCM1
- Hyperlipoproteinemia, type Ib; 207750; APOC2
- Hyperlysinemia; 238700; AASS
- Hypermethioninemia, persistent, autosomal dominant, due to methionine adenosyltransferase I/III deficiency; 250850; MAT1A
- Hyperornithinemia-hyperammonemia-homocitrullinemia syndrome; 238970; SLC25A15
- Hyperostosis, endosteal; 144750; LRP5
- Hyperoxaluria, primary, type 1; 259900; AGXT
- Hyperoxaluria, primary, type II; 260000; GRHPR
- Hyperoxaluria, primary, type III; 613616; DHDPSL
- Hyperparathyroidism, AD; 145000; MEN1
- Hyperparathyroidism, familial primary; 145000; HRPT2
- Hyperparathyroidism, neonatal; 239200; CASR
- Hyperparathyroidism-jaw tumor syndrome; 145001; HRPT2
- Hyperpehnylalaninemia, BH4-deficient, B; 233910; GCH1
- Hyperphenylalaninemia, BH4-deficient, A; 261640; PTS
- Hyperphenylalaninemia, BH4-deficient, C; 261630; QDPR
- Hyperphenylalaninemia, BH4-deficient, D; 264070; PCBD
- Hyperpigmentation, cutaneous, with hypertrichosis, hepatosplenomegaly, heart anomalies, hearing loss, and hypogonadism; 612391; SLC29A3
- Hyperpigmentation, familial progressive; 145250; KITLG
- Hyperprolinemia, type I; 239500; PRODH
- Hyperprolinemia, type II; 239510; ALDH4A1
- Hypertension, early-onset, autosomal dominant, with exacerbation in pregnancy; 605115; NR3C2
- Hypertension, essential; 145500; PNMT
- Hypertension, essential; 145500; AGTR1
- Hypertension, essential; 145500; PTGIS
- Hyperthyroidism, familial gestational; 603373; TSHR
- Hyperthyroidism, nonautoimmune; 609152; TSHR
- Hypertrophic osteoarthropathy, primary, autosomal recessive; 259100; HPGD
- Hyperuricemic nephropathy, familial juvenile 1; 162000; UMOD
- Hyperuricemic nephropathy, familial juvenile 2; 613092; REN
- Hypoaldosteronism, congenital, due to CMO I deficiency; 203400; CYP11B2
- Hypoaldosteronism, congenital, due to CMO II deficiency; 610600; CYP11B2
- Hypoalphalipoproteinemia; 604091; APOA1
- Hypocalcemia, autosomal dominant; 146200; CASR
- Hypocalciuric hypercalcemia, type I; 145980; CASR
- Hypochondroplasia; 146000; FGFR3
- Hypoglycemia of infancy, leucine-sensitive; 240800; ABCC8
- Hypogonadism, hypogonadotropic; 146110; PROK2
- Hypogonadotropic hypogonadism due to GNRH deficiency; 227200; GNRH1
- Hypogonadotropic hypogonadism; 146110; CHD7
- Hypogonadotropic hypogonadism; 146110; FGFR1
- Hypogonadotropic hypogonadism; 146110; KISS1R
- Hypogonadotropic hypogonadism; 146110; NELF
- Hypogonadotropic hypogonadism; 146110; TAC3
- Hypogonadotropic hypogonadism; 146110; TACR3
- Hypokalemic periodic paralysis type 1; 170400; CACNA1S
- Hypomagnesemia 4, renal; 611718; EGF
- Hypomagnesemia with secondary hypocalcemia; 602014; TRPM6
- Hypomagnesemia, primary; 248250; CLDN16
- Hypomagnesemia, renal, with ocular involvement; 248190; CLDN19
- Hypomagnesemia-2, renal; 154020; FXYD2
- Hypomyelination, global cerebral; 612949; SLC25A12
- Hypoparathyroidism, autosomal dominant; 146200; PTH
- Hypoparathyroidism, autosomal recessive; 146200; PTH
- Hypoparathyroidism, familial isolated; 146200; GCM2
- Hypoparathyroidism, sensorineural deafness, and renal dysplasia; 146255; GATA3
- Hypoparathyroidism-retardation-dysmorphism syndrome; 241410; TBCE
- Hypophosphatasia, adult; 146300; ALPL
- Hypophosphatasia, childhood; 241510; ALPL
- Hypophosphatasia, infantile; 241500; ALPL
- Hypophosphatemia, X-linked; 307800; PHEX
- Hypophosphatemic rickets with hypercalciuria; 241530; SLC34A3
- Hypophosphatemic rickets; 300554; CLCN5
- Hypophosphatemic rickets, AR; 241520; DMP1
- Hypophosphatemic rickets, autosomal dominant; 193100; FGF23
- Hypophosphatemic rickets, autosomal recessive, 2; 613312; ENPP1
- Hypoplastic left heart syndrome; 241550; GJA1
- Hypoproteinemia, hypercatabolic; 241600; B2M
- Hypospadias 1, X-linked; 300633; AR
- Hypospadias 2, X-linked; 300758; MAMLD1
- Hypothyroidism, congenital, nongoitrous 4; 275100; TSHB
- Hypothyroidism, congenital nongoitrous, 5; 225250; NKX2E
- Hypothyroidism, congenital, due to thyroid dysgenesis or hypoplasia; 218700; PAX8
- Hypothyroidism, congenital, nongoitrous; 275200; TSHR
- Hypotrichosis and recurrent skin vesicles; 613102; DSC3
- Hypotrichosis simplex of scalp; 146520; CDSN
- Hypotrichosis, congenital, with juvenile macular dystrophy; 601553; CDH3
- Hypotrichosis, hereditary, Marie Unna type, 1; 146550; HR
- Hypotrichosis, localized, autosomal recessive 2; 604379; LIPH
- Hypotrichosis, localized, autosomal recessive, 3; 611452; P2RY5
- Hypotrichosis, localized, autosomal recessive; 607903; DSG4
- Hypotrichosis-lymphedema-telangiectasia syndrome; 607823; SOX18
- Hypouricemia, renal, 2; 612076; SLC2A9
- Hypouricemia, renal; 220150; SLC22A12
- Hystrix-like ichthyosis with deafness; 602540; GJB2
- Ichthyosiform erythroderma, congenital; 242100; TGM1
- Ichthyosiform erythroderma, congenital, nonbullous, 1; 242100; ALOX12B
- Ichthyosiform erythroderma, congenital, nonbullous, 1; 242100; ALOXE3
- Ichthyosis bullosa of Siemens; 146800; KRT2
- Ichthyosis follicularis, atrichia, and photophobia syndrome; 308205; MBTPS2
- Ichthyosis histrix, Curth-Macklin Palmoplantar keratoderma, nonepidermolytic; 600962; KRT1
- Ichthyosis prematurity syndrome; 608649; SLC27A4
- Ichthyosis vulgaris; 146700; FLG
- Ichthyosis with confetti; 609165; KRT10
- Ichthyosis with hypotrichosis; 610765; ST14
- Ichthyosis, congenital, autosomal recessive; 612281; ICHYN
- Ichthyosis, cyclic, with epidermolytic hyperkeratosis; 607602; KRT1
- Ichthyosis, cyclic, with epidermolytic hyperkeratosis; 607602; KRT10
- Ichthyosis, harlequin; 242500; ABCA12
- Ichthyosis, lamellar 2; 601277; ABCA12
- Ichthyosis, lamellar, 3; 604777; CYP4F22
- Ichthyosis, lamellar, autosomal recessive; 242300; TGM1
- Ichthyosis, leukocyte vacuoles, alopecia, and sclerosing cholangitis; 607626; CLDN1
- Ichthyosis, X-linked; 308100; STS
- Iminoglycinuria, digenic; 242600; SLC36A2
- Iminoglycinuria, digenic; 242600; SLC6A19
- Iminoglycinuria, digenic; 242600; SLC6A20
- Immune dysfunction with T-cell inactivation due to calcium entry defect 1; 612782; ORAI1
- Immune dysfunction, with T-cell inactivation due to calcium entry defect 2; 612783; STIM1
- Immunodeficiency due to defect in CD3-zeta; 610163; CD247
- Immunodeficiency due to defect in MAPBP-interacting protein; 610798; MAPBPIP
- Immunodeficiency due to purine nucleoside phosphorylase deficiency; 613179; PNP
- Immunodeficiency with hyper IgM, type 4; 608106; UNG
- Immunodeficiency with hyper-IgM, type 2; 605258; AICDA
- Immunodeficiency with hyper-IgM, type 3; 606843; TNFRSF5
- Immunodeficiency, common variable, 1; 607594; ICOS
- Immunodeficiency, common variable, 2; 240500; TNFRSF13B
- Immunodeficiency, common variable, 3; 613493; CD19
- Immunodeficiency, common variable, 4; 613494; TNFRSF13C
- Immunodeficiency, common variable, 5; 613495; MS4A1
- Immunodeficiency, common variable, 6; 613496; CD81
- Immunodeficiency, hypogammaglobulinemia, and reduced B cells; 612692; CD79B
- Immunodeficiency, isolated; 300584; IKBKG
- Immunodeficiency, X-linked, with hyper-IgM; 308230; TNFSF5
- Immunodeficiency–centromeric instability–facial anomalies syndrome; 242860; DNMT3B
- Immunodysregulation, polyendocrinopathy, and enteropathy, X-linked; 304790; FOXP3
- Immunoglobulin A deficiency 2; 609529; TNFRSF13B
- Inclusion body myopathy with early-onset Paget disease and frontotemporal dementia; 167320; VCP
- Inclusion body myopathy, autosomal recessive; 600737; GNE
- Inclusion body myopathy-3; 605637; MYH2
- Incontinentia pigmenti, type II; 308300; IKBKG
- Infantile neuroaxonal dystrophy 1; 256600; PLA2G6
- Inflammatory bowel disease 25; 612567; CRFB4
- Insensitivity to pain, channelopathy-associated; 243000; SCN9A
- Insensitivity to pain, congenital, with anhidrosis; 256800; NTRK1
- Insomnia, fatal familial; 600072; PRNP
- Insulin resistance, severe, digenic; 604367; PPARG
- Insulin resistance, severe, digenic; 604367; PPP1R3A
- Insulin-like growth factor I, resistance to; 270450; IGF1R
- Interleukin 1 receptor antagonist deficiency; 612852; IL1RN
- Interleukin-2 receptor, alpha chain, deficiency of; 606367; IL2RA
- Intestinal pseudoobstruction, neuronal; 300048; FLNA
- Intrinsic factor deficiency; 261000; GIF
- Invasive pneumococcal disease, recurrent isolated, 1; 610799; IRAK4
- IRAK4 deficiency; 607676; IRAK4
- Iridogoniodysgenesis, type 1; 601631; FOXC1
- Iridogoniodysgenesis, type 2; 137600; PITX2
- Iris hypoplasia and glaucoma; 601631; FOXC1
- Iron-refractory iron deficiency anemia; 206200; TMPRSS6
- Isobutyryl-coenzyme A dehydrogenase deficiency; 611283; ACAD8
- Isovaleric acidemia; 243500; IVD
- IVIC syndrome; 147750; SALL4
- Jackson–Weiss syndrome; 123150; FGFR1
- Jackson–Weiss syndrome; 123150; FGFR2
- Jalili syndrome; 217080; CNNM4
- Jensen syndrome; 311150; TIMM8A
- Jervell and Lange-Nielsen syndrome 2; 612347; KCNE1
- Jervell and Lange-Nielsen syndrome; 220400; KCNQ1
- Johanson–Blizzard syndrome; 243800; UBR1
- Joubert syndrome 1; 213300; INPP5E
- Joubert syndrome 10; 300804; OFD1
- Joubert syndrome 2; 608091; TMEM216
- Joubert syndrome 4; 609583; NPHP1
- Joubert syndrome 5; 610188; CEP290
- Joubert syndrome 6; 610688; TMEM67
- Joubert syndrome 7; 611560; RPGRIP1L
- Joubert syndrome 8; 612291; ARL13B
- Joubert syndrome 9; 612285; CC2D2A
- Joubert syndrome-3; 608629; AHI1
- Juvenile polyposis syndrome, infantile form; 174900; BMPR1A
- Juvenile polyposis/hereditary hemorrhagic telangiectasia syndrome; 175050; MADH4
- Kallmann syndrome 2; 147950; FGFR1
- Kallmann syndrome 3; 244200; PROKR2
- Kallmann syndrome 4; 610628; PROK2
- Kallmann syndrome 5; 612370; CHD7
- Kallmann syndrome 6; 612702; FGF8
- Kanzaki disease; 609242; NAGA
- Karak syndrome; 610217; PLA2G6
- Kenny–Caffey syndrome-1; 244460; TBCE
- Keratitis; 148190; PAX6
- Keratitis–ichthyosis–deafness syndrome; 148210; GJB2
- Keratoconus; 148300; VSX1
- Keratoderma, palmoplantar, with deafness; 148350; GJB2
- Keratosis follicularis spinulosa decalvans; 308800; SAT1
- Keratosis linearis with ichthyosis congenita and sclerosing keratoderma; 601952; POMP
- Keratosis palmoplantaris striata I; 148700; DSG1
- Keratosis palmoplantaris striata II; 612908; DSP
- Keratosis palmoplantaris striata III; 607654; KRT1
- Keratosis, seborrheic, somatic; 182000; PIK3CA
- Keutel syndrome; 245150; MGP
- Kindler syndrome; 173650; KIND1
- Kleefstra syndrome; 610253; EHMT1
- Klippel–Feil syndrome, autosomal dominant; 118100; GDF6
- Kniest dysplasia; 156550; COL2A1
- Knobloch syndrome, type 1; 267750; COL18A1
- Kowarski syndrome; 262650; GH1
- Krabbe disease; 245200; GALC
- Krabbe disease, atypical; 611722; PSAP
- L-2-hydroxyglutaric aciduria; 236792; L2HGDH
- Lactase deficiency, congenital; 223000; LCT
- Lactase persistence/nonpersistence; 223100; MCM6
- Lactic acidosis, fatal infantile; 245400; SUCLG1
- Lacticacidemia due to PDX1 deficiency; 245349; PDX1
- LADD syndrome; 149730; FGF10
- LADD syndrome; 149730; FGFR3
- Laing distal myopathy; 160500; MYH7
- Langer mesomelic dysplasia; 249700; SHOX
- Langer mesomelic dysplasia; 249700; SHOXY
- Laron dwarfism; 262500; GHR
- Larsen syndrome; 150250; FLNB
- Laryngoonychocutaneous syndrome; 245660; LAMA3
- Lathosterolosis; 607330; SC5DL
- LCHAD deficiency; 609016; HADHA
- Leber congenital amaurosis 1; 204000; GUCY2D
- Leber congenital amaurosis 10; 611755; CEP290
- Leber congenital amaurosis 12; 610612; RD3
- Leber congenital amaurosis 13; 612712; RDH12
- Leber congenital amaurosis 14; 613341; LRAT
- Leber congenital amaurosis 2; 204100; RPE65
- Leber congenital amaurosis 3; 604232; SPATA7
- Leber congenital amaurosis 4; 604393; AIPL1
- Leber congenital amaurosis 5; 604537; LCA5
- Left ventricular noncompaction 1, with or without congenital heart defects; 604169; DTNA
- Left ventricular noncompaction 3, with or without dilated cardiomyopathy; 601493; LDB3
- Left ventricular noncompaction 4; 613424; ACTC1
- Left ventricular noncompaction 5; 613426; MYH7
- Left ventricular noncompaction 6; 601494; TNNT2
- Left ventricular noncompaction, X-linked; 300183; TAZ
- Legius syndrome; 611431; SPRED1
- Leigh syndrome due to cytochrome c oxidase deficiency; 256000; COX15
- Leigh syndrome due to mitochondrial complex I deficiency; 256000; C8orf38
- Leigh syndrome due to mitochondrial complex I deficiency; 256000; NDUFA2
- Leigh syndrome; 256000; BCS1L
- Leigh syndrome; 256000; DLD
- Leigh syndrome; 256000; NDUFS3
- Leigh syndrome; 256000; NDUFS4
- Leigh syndrome; 256000; NDUFS7
- Leigh syndrome; 256000; NDUFS8
- Leigh syndrome; 256000; NDUFV1
- Leigh syndrome; 256000; SDHA
- Leigh syndrome, due to COX deficiency; 256000; SURF1
- Leigh syndrome, French-Canadian type; 220111; LRPPRC
- Leigh syndrome, X-linked; 308930; PDHA1
- Leiomyomatosis and renal cell cancer; 605839; FH
- Leiomyomatosis, diffuse, with Alport syndrome; 308940; COL4A6
- LEOPARD syndrome 2; 611554; RAF1
- Leopard syndrome; 151100; PTPN11
- Leprechaunism; 246200; INSR
- Léri–Weill dyschondrosteosis; 127300; SHOX
- Leri–Weill dyschondrosteosis; 127300; SHOXY
- Lesch–Nyhan syndrome; 300322; HPRT1
- Lethal congenital contractural syndrome 2; 607598; ERBB3
- Lethal congenital contractural syndrome 3; 611369; PIP5K1C
- Lethal congenital contracture syndrome 1; 253310; GLE1
- Leukemia, acute lymphocytic; 613065; BCR
- Leukemia, acute myelogenous; 601626; AMLCR2 (non-gene region)
- Leukemia, acute myelogenous; 601626; GMPS
- Leukemia, acute myelogenous; 601626; JAK2
- Leukemia, acute myeloid; 601626; MLF1
- Leukemia, acute myeloid; 601626; NSD1
- Leukemia, acute myeloid; 601626; SH3GL1
- Leukemia, acute myeloid; 601626; AF10
- Leukemia, acute myeloid; 601626; ARHGEF12
- Leukemia, acute myeloid; 601626; CEBPA
- Leukemia, acute myeloid; 601626; FLT3
- Leukemia, acute myeloid; 601626; KIT
- Leukemia, acute myeloid; 601626; LPP
- Leukemia, acute myeloid; 601626; NPM1
- Leukemia, acute myeloid; 601626; NUP214
- Leukemia, acute myeloid; 601626; PICALM
- Leukemia, acute myeloid; 601626; RUNX1
- Leukemia, acute myeloid; 601626; WHSC1L1
- Leukemia, acute myeloid, somatic; 601626; ETV6
- Leukemia, acute promyelocytic; 612376; RARA
- Leukemia, chronic myeloid; 608232; BCR
- Leukemia, juvenile myelomonocytic; 607785; ARHGAP26
- Leukemia, juvenile myelomonocytic; 607785; NF1
- Leukemia, juvenile myelomonocytic; 607785; PTPN11
- Leukemia, megakaryoblastic, of Down syndrome; 190685; GATA1
- Leukemia, megakaryoblastic, with or without Down syndrome; 190685; GATA1
- Leukocyte adhesion deficiency; 116920; ITGB2
- Leukocyte adhesion deficiency, type III; 612840; KIND3
- Leukodystrophy, adult-onset, autosomal dominant; 169500; LMNB1
- Leukodystrophy, dysmyelinating, and spastic paraparesis with or without dystonia; 612443; FA2H
- Leukodystrophy, hypomyelinating, 2; 608804; GJC2
- Leukodystrophy, hypomyelinating, 4; 612233; HSPD1
- Leukodystrophy, hypomyelinating, 5; 610532; HYCC1
- Leukoencephalopathy with brain stem and spinal cord involvement and lactate elevation; 611105; DARS2
- Leukoencephalopathy with vanishing white matter; 603896; EIF2B1
- Leukoencephalopathy with vanishing white matter; 603896; EIF2B2
- Leukoencephalopathy with vanishing white matter; 603896; EIF2B3
- Leukoencephalopathy with vanishing white matter; 603896; EIF2B5
- Leukoencephalopathy, cystic, without megalencephaly; 612951; RNASET2
- Leukoencephalopathy with vanishing white matter; 603896; EIF2B4
- Leydig cell adenoma, somatic, with precocious puberty; 176410; LHCGR
- Leydig cell hypoplasia with hypergonadotropic hypogonadism; 238320; LHCGR
- Leydig cell hypoplasia with pseudohermaphroditism; 238320; LHCGR
- Lhermitte–Duclos syndrome; 158350; PTEN
- Liddle syndrome; 177200; SCNN1B
- Liddle syndrome; 177200; SCNN1G
- Li–Fraumeni syndrome; 151623; CDKN2A
- Li–Fraumeni syndrome; 151623; TP53
- Li–Fraumeni syndrome; 609265; CHEK2
- Li–Fraumeni-like syndrome; 151623; TP53
- LIG4 syndrome; 606593; LIG4
- Limb-mammary syndrome; 603543; TP63
- Lipase deficiency, combined; 246650; LMF1
- Lipodystrophy, congenital generalized, type 1; 608594; AGPAT2
- Lipodystrophy, congenital generalized, type 2; 269700; BSCL2
- Lipodystrophy, congenital generalized, type 3; 612526; CAV1
- Lipodystrophy, congenital generalized, type 4; 613327; PTRF
- Lipodystrophy, familial partial; 151660; LMNA
- Lipodystrophy, familial partial, type 3; 604367; PPARG
- Lipodystrophy, partial, acquired; 608709; LMNB2
- Lipoid adrenal hyperplasia; 201710; STAR
- Lipoid congenital adrenal hyperplasia; 201710; CYP11A
- Lipoid proteinosis; 247100; ECM1
- Lipoprotein glomerulopathy; 611771; APOE
- Lipoprotein lipase deficiency; 238600; LPL
- Lissencephaly 3; 611603; TUBA1A
- Lissencephaly syndrome, Norman–Roberts type; 257320; RELN
- Lissencephaly, X-linked 2; 300215; ARX
- Lissencephaly, X-linked; 300067; DCX
- Lissencephaly-1; 607432; PAFAH1B1
- Liver failure, acute infantile; 613070; TRMU
- Loeys–Dietz syndrome, type 1A; 609192; TGFBR1
- Loeys–Dietz syndrome, type 1B; 610168; TGFBR2
- Loeys–Dietz syndrome, type 2A; 608967; TGFBR1
- Loeys–Dietz syndrome, type 2B; 610380; TGFBR2
- Long QT syndrome 12; 612955; SNTA1
- Long QT syndrome 13; 613485; KCNJ5
- Long QT syndrome-1; 192500; KCNQ1
- Long QT syndrome-10; 611819; SCN4B
- Long QT syndrome-11; 611820; AKAP9
- Long QT syndrome-3; 603830; SCN5A
- Long QT syndrome-4; 600919; ANK2
- Long QT syndrome-7; 170390; KCNJ2
- Long QT syndrome-9; 611818; CAV3
- Lowe syndrome; 309000; OCRL
- Lujan–Fryns syndrome; 309520; MED12
- Lung cancer; 211980; DLEC1
- Lung cancer; 211980; RASSF1
- Lung cancer; 211980; KRAS
- Lung cancer; 211980; PPP2R1B
- Lung cancer; 211980; SLC22A1L
- Lung cancer, somatic; 211980; MAP3K8
- Luteinizing hormone resistance, female; 238320; LHCGR
- Lymphangioleiomyomatosis; 606690; TSC1
- Lymphangioleiomyomatosis, somatic; 606690; TSC2
- Lymphedema, hereditary I; 153100; FLT4
- Lymphedema, hereditary, IC; 613480; GJC2
- Lymphedema–distichiasis syndrome with renal disease and diabetes mellitus; 153400; FOXC2
- Lymphedema–distichiasis syndrome; 153400; FOXC2
- Lymphoma, non-Hodgkin; 605027; PRF1
- Lymphoma, non-Hodgkin, somatic; 605027; RAD54L
- Lymphoproliferative syndrome, EBV-associated, autosomal, 1; 613011; ITK
- Lymphoproliferative syndrome, X-linked, 2; 300635; BIRC4
- Lymphoproliferative syndrome, X-linked; 308240; SH2D1A
- Lysinuric protein intolerance; 222700; SLC7A7
- Lysosomal acid phosphatase deficiency; 200950; ACP2
- Lysyl hydroxylase 3 deficiency; 612394; PLOD3
- Machado–Joseph disease; 109150; ATXN3
- Macrocephaly, alopecia, cutis laxa, and scoliosis; 613075; RIN2
- Macrocephaly/autism syndrome; 605309; PTEN
- Macrocytic anemia, refractory, due to 5q deletion, somatic; 153550; RPS14
- Macrothrombocytopenia and progressive sensorineural deafness; 600208; MYH9
- Macrothrombocytopenia; 300367; GATA1
- Macrothrombocytopenia, autosomal dominant, TUBB1-related; 613112; TUBB1
- Macular corneal dystrophy; 217800; CHST6
- Macular degeneration, age-related, 11; 611953; CST3
- Macular degeneration, age-related, 2; 153800; ABCA4
- Macular degeneration, age-related, 3; 608895; FBLN5
- Macular degeneration juvenile; 248200; CNGB3
- Macular dystrophy, autosomal dominant, chromosome 6-linked; 600110; ELOVL4
- Macular dystrophy, patterned; 169150; PRPH2
- Macular dystrophy, retinal, 2; 608051; PROM1
- Macular dystrophy, vitelliform; 608161; PRPH2
- Majeed syndrome; 609628; LPIN2
- Major depressive disorder 1; 608516; MDD1 (non-gene locus)
- Major depressive disorder 2; 608516; MDD2 (non-gene locus)
- Male infertility with large-headed, multiflagellar, polyploid spermatozoa; 243060; STK13
- Male infertility, nonsyndromic, autosomal recessive; 612997; CATSPER1
- Malonyl-CoA decarboxylase deficiency; 248360; MLYCD
- Mandibuloacral dysplasia with type B lipodystrophy; 608612; ZMPSTE24
- Mandibuloacral dysplasia; 248370; LMNA
- Mannosidosis, alpha-, types I and II; 248500; MAN2B1
- Mannosidosis, beta; 248510; MANBA
- Maple syrup urine disease, type Ia; 248600; BCKDHA
- Maple syrup urine disease, type Ib; 248600; BCKDHB
- Maple syrup urine disease, type II; 248600; DBT
- Maple syrup urine disease, type III; 248600; DLD
- Marfan syndrome; 154700; FBN1
- Marinesco–Sjögren syndrome; 248800; SIL1
- Maroteaux–Lamy syndrome, several forms; 253200; ARSB
- Marshall syndrome; 154780; COL11A1
- Martsolf syndrome; 212720; RAB3GAP2
- MASA syndrome; 303350; L1CAM
- MASS syndrome; 604308; FBN1
- Mast syndrome; 248900; ACP33
- Maturity-onset diabetes of the young 6; 606394; NEUROD1
- Maturity-onset diabetes of the young, type 10; 613370; INS
- Maturity-onset diabetes of the young, type 11; 613375; BLK
- Maturity-onset diabetes of the young, type IX; 612225; PAX4
- Maturity-onset diabetes of the young, type VII; 610508; KLF11
- Maturity-onset diabetes of the young, type VIII; 609812; CEL
- May–Hegglin anomaly; 155100; MYH9
- McArdle disease; 232600; PYGM
- McCune–Albright syndrome; 174800; GNAS
- McKusick–Kaufman syndrome; 236700; MKKS
- Meacham syndrome; 608978; WT1
- Meckel syndrome 7; 267010; NPHP3
- Meckel syndrome type 4; 611134; CEP290
- Meckel syndrome, type 1; 249000; MKS1
- Meckel syndrome, type 3; 607361; TMEM67
- Meckel syndrome, type 5; 611561; RPGRIP1L
- Meckel syndrome, type 6; 612284; CC2D2A
- Medullary cystic kidney disease 2; 603860; UMOD
- Medullary thyroid carcinoma; 155240; RET
- Medullary thyroid carcinoma, familial; 155240; NTRK1
- Medulloblastoma; 155255; PTCH2
- Medulloblastoma, desmoplastic; 155255; SUFU
- Meesmann corneal dystrophy; 122100; KRT12
- Meesmann corneal dystrophy; 122100; KRT3
- Megalencephalic leukoencephalopathy with subcortical cysts; 604004; MLC1
- Megaloblastic anemia-1, Finnish type; 261100; CUBN
- Megaloblastic anemia-1, Norwegian type; 261100; AMN
- Melanoma and neural system tumor syndrome; 155755; CDKN2A
- Melanoma; 609048; CDK4
- Melanoma, cutaneous malignant, 2; 155601; CDKN2A
- Meleda disease; 248300; SLURP1
- Melnick–Needles syndrome; 309350; FLNA
- Melorheostosis with osteopoikilosis; 155950; LEMD3
- Membranoproliferative glomerulonephritis with CFH deficiency; 609814; HF1
- Meningioma; 607174; MN1
- Meningioma, NF2-related, somatic; 607174; NF2
- Menkes disease; 309400; ATP7A
- Mental retardation and microcephaly with pontine and cerebellar hypoplasia; 300749; CASK
- Mental retardation in cri-du-chat syndrome; 123450; CTNND2
- Mental retardation syndrome, X-linked, Cabezas type; 300354; CUL4B
- Mental retardation syndrome, X-linked, Siderius type; 300263; PHF8
- Mental retardation, autosomal dominant 1; 156200; MBD5
- Mental retardation, autosomal dominant 3; 612580; CDH15
- Mental retardation, autosomal dominant 4; 612581; KIRREL3
- Mental retardation, autosomal dominant 5; 612621; SYNGAP
- Mental retardation, autosomal recessive 1; 249500; PRSS12
- Mental retardation, autosomal recessive 13; 613192; TRAPPC9
- Mental retardation, autosomal recessive 2A; 607417; CRBN
- Mental retardation, autosomal recessive 3; 608443; CC2D1A
- Mental retardation, autosomal recessive 7; 611093; TUSC3
- Mental retardation, autosomal recessive, 6; 611092; GRIK2
- Mental retardation, FRA12A type; 136630; DIP2B
- Mental retardation, joint hypermobility and skin laxity, with or without metabolic abnormalities; 612652; ALDH18A1
- Mental retardation, stereotypic movements, epilepsy, and/or cerebral malformations; 613443; MEF2C
- Mental retardation, truncal obesity, retinal dystrophy, and micropenis; 610156; INPP5E
- Mental retardation, X-linked 1; 309530; IQSEC2
- Mental retardation, X-linked 17/31, microduplication; 300705; HSD17B10
- Mental retardation, X-linked 30; 300558; PAK3
- Mental retardation, X-linked 36/43/54; 300419; ARX
- Mental retardation, X-linked 45; 300498; ZNF81
- Mental retardation, X-linked 58; 300210; TM4SF2
- Mental retardation, X-linked 59; 300630; AP1S2
- Mental retardation, X-linked 93; 300659; BRWD3
- Mental retardation, X-linked 94; 300699; GRIA3
- Mental retardation, X-linked 95; 300716; MAGT1
- Mental retardation, X-linked nonspecific; 309541; GDI1
- Mental retardation, X-linked nonspecific, 63; 300387; ACSL4
- Mental retardation, X-linked nonspecific, type 46; 300436; ARHGEF6
- Mental retardation, X-linked syndromic 10; 300220; HSD17B10
- Mental retardation, X-linked syndromic, Christianson type; 300243; SLC9A6
- Mental retardation, X-linked syndromic, Turner type; 300706; HUWE1
- Mental retardation, X-linked, 21/34; 300143; IL1RAPL1
- Mental retardation, X-linked; 300495; NLGN4
- Mental retardation, X-linked, FRAXE type; 309548; AFF2
- Mental retardation, X-linked, Lubs type; 300260; MECP2
- Mental retardation, X-linked, Snyder-Robinson type; 309583; SMS
- Mental retardation, X-linked, syndromic 13; 300055; MECP2
- Mental retardation, X-linked, syndromic 14; 300676; UPF3B
- Mental retardation, X-linked, syndromic, JARID1C-related; 300534; KDM5C
- Mental retardation, X-linked, with cerebellar hypoplasia and distinctive facial appearance; 300486; OPHN1
- Mental retardation, X-linked, with epilepsy; 300423; ATP6AP2
- Mental retardation, X-linked, with isolated growth hormone deficiency; 300123; SOX3
- Mental retardation, X-linked, with or without epilepsy; 300802; SYP
- Mental retardation, X-linked, ZDHHC9-related; 300799; ZDHHC9
- Mental retardation, X-linked-72; 300271; RAB39B
- Mental retardation, X-linked-9; 309549; FTSJ1
- Mental retardation, X-linked-91; 300577; ZDHHC15
- Mental retardation-hypotonic facies syndrome, X-linked, 2; 300639; CUL4B
- Mental retardation-hypotonic facies syndrome, X-linked; 309580; ATRX
- Mephenytoin poor metabolizer; 609535; CYP2C
- Metachondromatosis; 156250; PTPN11
- Metachromatic leukodystrophy due to SAP-b deficiency; 249900; PSAP
- Metachromatic leukodystrophy; 250100; ARSA
- Metaphyseal anadysplasia 1; 602111; MMP13
- Metaphyseal anadysplasia 2; 613073; MMP9
- Metaphyseal chondrodysplasia, Murk Jansen type; 156400; PTHR1
- Metaphyseal dysplasia without hypotrichosis; 250460; RMRP
- Metatropic dysplasia; 156530; TRPV4
- Methemoglobinemia, type I; 250800; CYB5R3
- Methemoglobinemia, type II; 250800; CYB5R3
- Methemoglobinemia, type IV; 250790; CYB5A
- Methionine adenosyltransferase deficiency, autosomal recessive; 250850; MAT1A
- Methylcobalamin deficiency, cblG type; 250940; MTR
- Methylmalonic aciduria and homocystinuria, cblC type; 277400; MMACHC
- Methylmalonic aciduria and homocystinuria, cblD type; 277410; C2orf25
- Methylmalonic aciduria and homocystinuria, cblF type; 277380; LMBRD1
- Methylmalonic aciduria due to transcobalamin receptor defect; 613646; CD320
- Methylmalonic aciduria, cblD type, variant 2; 277410; C2orf25
- Methylmalonic aciduria, vitamin B12-responsive; 251100; MMAA
- Methylmalonic aciduria, vitamin B12-responsive, due to defect in synthesis of adenosylcobalamin, cblB complementation type; 251110; MMAB
- Methylmalonyl-CoA epimerase deficiency; 251120; MCEE
- Mevalonic aciduria; 610377; MVK
- MHC class II deficiency, complementation group B; 209920; RFXANK
- Micochondrial phosphate carrier deficiency; 610773; SLC25A3
- Microcephalic osteodysplastic primordial dwarfism type II; 210720; PCNT
- Microcephaly and digital abnormalities with normal intelligence; 602585; MYCN
- Microcephaly, Amish type; 607196; SLC25A19
- Microcephaly, autosomal recessive 1; 251200; MCPH1
- Microcephaly, primary autosomal recessive, 2; 251200; MCPH2
- Microcephaly, primary autosomal recessive, 3; 604804; CDK5RAP2
- Microcephaly, primary autosomal recessive, 4; 251200; MCPH4
- Microcephaly, primary autosomal recessive, 5, with or without simplified gyral pattern; 608716; ASPM
- Microcephaly, primary autosomal recessive, 6; 608393; CENPJ
- Microcephaly, primary autosomal recessive, 7; 612703; STIL
- Microcephaly, seizures, and developmental delay; 613402; PNKP
- Microcornea, rod-cone dystrophy, cataract, and posterior staphyloma; 193220; BEST1
- Microphthalmia, isolated 2; 610093; CHX10
- Microphthalmia, isolated 3; 611038; RAX
- Microphthalmia, isolated 4; 613094; GDF6
- Microphthalmia, isolated 5; 611040; MFRP
- Microphthalmia, isolated, with cataract 2; 212550; SIX6
- Microphthalmia, isolated, with cataract 4; 610426; CRYBA4
- Microphthalmia, isolated, with coloboma 3; 610092; CHX10
- Microphthalmia, isolated, with coloboma 5; 611638; SHH
- Microphthalmia, syndromic 2; 300166; BCOR
- Microphthalmia, syndromic 3; 206900; SOX2
- Microphthalmia, syndromic 5; 610125; OTX2
- Microphthalmia, syndromic 6; 607932; BMP4
- Microphthalmia, syndromic 7; 309801; HCCS
- Microphthalmia, syndromic 9; 601186; STRA6
- Microtia, hearing impairment, and cleft palate; 612290; HOXA2
- Microvillus inclusion disease; 251850; MYO5B
- Migraine, familial basilar; 602481; ATP1A2
- Migraine, familial hemiplegic, 2; 602481; ATP1A2
- Migraine, familial hemiplegic, 3; 609634; SCN1A
- Migraine, resistance to; 157300; EDNRA
- Miller syndrome; 264750; DHODH
- Minicore myopathy with external ophthalmoplegia; 255320; RYR1
- Mirror movements, congenital; 157600; DCC
- Mirror-image polydactyly; 135750; MIPOL1
- Mismatch repair cancer syndrome; 276300; MLH1
- Mismatch repair cancer syndrome; 276300; MSH2
- Mismatch repair cancer syndrome; 276300; MSH6
- Mismatch repair cancer syndrome; 276300; PMS2
- Mitochondrial complex 1 deficiency; 252010; C20orf7
- Mitochondrial complex I deficiency; 252010; NDUFA1
- Mitochondrial complex I deficiency; 252010; NDUFA11
- Mitochondrial complex I deficiency; 252010; NDUFAF2
- Mitochondrial complex I deficiency; 252010; NDUFAF3
- Mitochondrial complex I deficiency; 252010; NDUFAF4
- Mitochondrial complex I deficiency; 252010; NDUFS1
- Mitochondrial complex I deficiency; 252010; NDUFS2
- Mitochondrial complex I deficiency; 252010; NDUFS4
- Mitochondrial complex I deficiency; 252010; NDUFV1
- Mitochondrial complex I deficiency; 252010; NDUFV2
- Mitochondrial complex II deficiency; 252011; SDHAF1
- Mitochondrial complex III deficiency; 124000; BCS1L
- Mitochondrial complex III deficiency; 124000; UQCRB
- Mitochondrial complex III deficiency; 124000; UQCRQ
- Mitochondrial complex IV deficiency; 220110; FASTKD2
- Mitochondrial DNA depletion syndrome, encephalomyopathic form, with methylmalonic aciduria; 612073; SUCLA2
- Mitochondrial DNA depletion syndrome, encephalomyopathic form, with renal tubulopathy; 612075; RRM2B
- Mitochondrial DNA depletion syndrome, hepatocerebral form; 251880; C10orf2
- Mitochondrial DNA depletion syndrome, hepatocerebral form; 251880; MPV17
- Mitochondrial DNA depletion syndrome, myopathic form; 609560; TK2
- Mitochondrial DNA-depletion syndrome, hepatocerebral form; 251880; DGUOK
- Mitochondrial myopathy and sideroblastic anemia; 600462; PUS1
- Mitochondrial neurogastrointestinal encephalomyopathy syndrome; 603041; TYMP
- Mitochondrial respiratory chain complex II deficiency; 252011; SDHA
- Miyoshi muscular dystrophy 3; 613319; ANO5
- Miyoshi myopathy; 254130; DYSF
- MNGIE without leukoencephalopathy; 603041; POLG
- MODY, type I; 125850; HNF4A
- MODY, type II; 125851; GCK
- MODY, type III; 600496; HNF1A
- MODY, type IV; 606392; IPF1
- Mohr–Tranebjærg syndrome; 304700; TIMM8A
- Molybdenum cofactor deficiency, type A; 252150; MOCS1
- Molybdenum cofactor deficiency, type B; 252150; MOCS2
- Molybdenum cofactor deficiency, type C; 252150; GPHN
- Monilethrix; 158000; KRT81
- Monilethrix; 158000; KRT83
- Monilethrix; 158000; KRT86
- Mononeuropathy of the median nerve, mild; 613353; SH3TC2
- Morning glory disc anomaly; 120430; PAX6
- Morquio syndrome B; 253010; GLB1
- Mosaic variegated aneuploidy syndrome; 257300; BUB1B
- Mowat–Wilson syndrome; 235730; ZEB2
- Muckle–Wells syndrome; 191900; NLRP3
- Mucolipidosis II alpha/beta; 252500; GNPTAB
- Mucolipidosis III alpha/beta; 252600; GNPTAB
- Mucolipidosis III gamma; 252605; GNPTAG
- Mucolipidosis IV; 252650; MCOLN1
- Mucopolysaccharidosis Ih; 607014; IDUA
- Mucopolysaccharidosis Ih/s; 607015; IDUA
- Mucopolysaccharidosis Is; 607016; IDUA
- Mucopolysaccharidosis IVA; 253000; GALNS
- Mucopolysaccharidosis type IIID; 252940; GNS
- Mucopolysaccharidosis type IX; 601492; HYAL1
- Mucopolysaccharidosis VII; 253220; GUSB
- Muenke syndrome; 602849; FGFR3
- Muir–Torre syndrome; 158320; MLH1
- Muir–Torre syndrome; 158320; MSH2
- Mulibrey nanism; 253250; TRIM37
- Müllerian aplasia and hyperandrogenism; 158330; WNT4
- Multiple cutaneous and uterine leiomyomata; 150800; FH
- Multiple endocrine neoplasia IIA; 171400; RET
- Multiple endocrine neoplasia IIB; 162300; RET
- Multiple endocrine neoplasia, type IV; 610755; CDKN1B
- Multiple pterygium syndrome, lethal type; 253290; CHRNA1
- Multiple pterygium syndrome, lethal type; 253290; CHRND
- Multiple pterygium syndrome, lethal type; 253290; CHRNG
- Multiple sulfatase deficiency; 272200; SUMF1
- Multiple synostoses syndrome 3; 612961; FGF9
- Muscle glycogenosis; 300559; PHKA1
- Muscular dystrophy with epidermolysis bullosa simplex; 226670; PLEC1
- Muscular dystrophy, congenital merosin-deficient; 607855; LAMA2
- Muscular dystrophy, congenital, due to ITGA7 deficiency; 613204; ITGA7
- Muscular dystrophy, congenital, due to partial LAMA2 deficiency; 607855; LAMA2
- Muscular dystrophy, limb-girdle, type 1A; 159000; TTID
- Muscular dystrophy, limb-girdle, type 1B; 159001; LMNA
- Muscular dystrophy, limb-girdle, type 2A; 253600; CAPN3
- Muscular dystrophy, limb-girdle, type 2B; 253601; DYSF
- Muscular dystrophy, limb-girdle, type 2C; 253700; SGCG
- Muscular dystrophy, limb-girdle, type 2D; 608099; SGCA
- Muscular dystrophy, limb-girdle, type 2E; 604286; SGCB
- Muscular dystrophy, limb-girdle, type 2F; 601287; SGCD
- Muscular dystrophy, limb-girdle, type 2G; 601954; TCAP
- Muscular dystrophy, limb-girdle, type 2H; 254110; TRIM32
- Muscular dystrophy, limb-girdle, type 2J; 608807; TTN
- Muscular dystrophy, limb-girdle, type 2L; 611307; ANO5
- Muscular dystrophy, limb-girdle, type IC; 607801; CAV3
- Muscular dystrophy, rigid spine, 1; 602771; SELENON
- Myasthenia, limb-girdle, familial; 254300; AGRN
- Myasthenia, limb-girdle, familial; 254300; DOK7
- Myasthenic syndrome, congenital, associated with acetylcholine receptor deficiency; 608931; CHRNB1
- Myasthenic syndrome, congenital, associated with acetylcholine receptor deficiency; 608931; CHRNE
- Myasthenic syndrome, congenital, associated with acetylcholine receptor deficiency; 608931; MUSK
- Myasthenic syndrome, congenital, associated with acetylcholine receptor deficiency; 608931; RAPSN
- Myasthenic syndrome, congenital, associated with episodic apnea; 254210; CHAT
- Myasthenic syndrome, congenital, associated with facial dysmorphism and acetylcholine receptor deficiency; 608931; RAPSN
- Myasthenic syndrome, fast-channel congenital; 608930; CHRNA1
- Myasthenic syndrome, fast-channel congenital; 608930; CHRND
- Myasthenic syndrome, fast-channel congenital; 608930; CHRNE
- Myasthenic syndrome, slow-channel congenital; 601462; CHRNA1
- Myasthenic syndrome, slow-channel congenital; 601462; CHRNB1
- Myasthenic syndrome, slow-channel congenital; 601462; CHRND
- Myasthenic syndrome, slow-channel congenital; 601462; CHRNE
- Mycobacterial infection, atypical, familial disseminated; 209950; IFNGR1
- Mycobacterial infection, atypical, familial disseminated; 209950; STAT1
- Myelofibrosis, idiopathic; 254450; JAK2
- Myeloperoxidase deficiency; 254600; MPO
- Myeloproliferative disorder with eosinophilia; 131440; PDGFRB
- Myoclonic epilepsy, severe, of infancy; 607208; GABRG2
- Myoglobinuria, acute recurrent, autosomal recessive; 268200; LPIN1
- Myokymia with neonatal epilepsy; 606437; KCNQ2
- Myopathy due to CPT II deficiency; 255110; CPT2
- Myopathy with lactic acidosis, hereditary; 255125; ISCU
- Myopathy, actin, congenital, with excess of thin myofilaments; 161800; ACTA1
- Myopathy, cardioskeletal, desmin-related, with cataract; 608810; CRYAB
- Myopathy, centronuclear; 160150; DNM2
- Myopathy, centronuclear; 160150; MYF6
- Myopathy, centronuclear, autosomal recessive; 255200; BIN1
- Myopathy, congenital, Compton-North; 612540; CNTN1
- Myopathy, congenital, with fiber-type disproportion 1; 255310; ACTA1
- Myopathy, desmin-related, cardioskeletal; 601419; DES
- Myopathy, distal 2; 606070; MATR3
- Myopathy, distal, with anterior tibial onset; 606768; DYSF
- Myopathy, early-onset, with fatal cardiomyopathy; 611705; TTN
- Myopathy, mitochondrial progressive, with congenital cataract, hearing loss, and developmental delay; 613076; GFER
- Myopathy, myofibrillar, BAG3-related; 612954; BAG3
- Myopathy, myofibrillar, filamin C-related; 609524; FLNC
- Myopathy, myofibrillar, ZASP-related; 609452; LDB3
- Myopathy, myosin storage; 608358; MYH7
- Myopathy, nemaline, 3; 161800; ACTA1
- Myopathy, proximal, with early respiratory muscle involvement; 603689; TTN
- Myopathy, reducing body, X-linked, childhood-onset; 300718; FHL1
- Myopathy, reducing body, X-linked, severe early-onset; 300717; FHL1
- Myopathy, spheroid body; 182920; TTID
- Myopathy, X-linked, with postural muscle atrophy; 300696; FHL1
- Myosclerosis, congenital; 255600; COL6A2
- Myotilinopathy; 609200; TTID
- Myotonia congenita, atypical, acetazolamide-responsive; 608390; SCN4A
- Myotonia congenita, dominant; 160800; CLCN1
- Myotonia congenita, recessive; 255700; CLCN1
- Myotonic dystrophy; 160900; DMPK
- Myotonic dystrophy, type 2; 602668; ZNF9
- Myotubular myopathy, X-linked; 310400; MTM1
- Myxoid liposarcoma; 613488; DDIT3
- Myxoma, intracardiac; 255960; PRKAR1A
- N syndrome; 310465; POLA1
- N-Acetylglutamate synthase deficiency; 237310; NAGS
- Naegeli–Franceschetti–Jadassohn syndrome; 161000; KRT14
- Nail–patella syndrome; 161200; LMX1B
- Nance–Horan syndrome; 302350; NHS
- Narcolepsy 1; 161400; HCRT
- Nasopharyngeal carcinoma; 607107; TP53
- Nasu–Hakola disease; 221770; TREM2
- Nasu–Hakola disease; 221770; TYROBP
- Naxos disease; 601214; JUP
- Nemaline myopathy 1, autosomal dominant; 609284; TPM3
- Nemaline myopathy 2, autosomal recessive; 256030; NEB
- Nemaline myopathy 7; 610687; CFL2
- Nemaline myopathy; 609285; TPM2
- Nemaline myopathy, Amish type; 605355; TNNT1
- Nephrogenic syndrome of inappropriate antidiuresis; 300539; AVPR2
- Nephrolithiasis, type I; 310468; CLCN5
- Nephrolithiasis/osteoporosis, hypophosphatemic, 1; 612286; SLC34A1
- Nephrolithiasis/osteoporosis, hypophosphatemic, 2; 612287; SLC9A3R1
- Nephronophthisis 1, juvenile; 256100; NPHP1
- Nephronophthisis 2, infantile; 602088; INVS
- Nephronophthisis 3; 604387; NPHP3
- Nephronophthisis 4; 606966; NPHP4
- Nephronophthisis 7; 611498; GLIS2
- Nephropathy with pretibial epidermolysis bullosa and deafness; 609057; CD151
- Nephrosis, congenital, with or without ocular abnormalities; 609049; LAMB2
- Nephrotic syndrome, type 1; 256300; NPHS1
- Nephrotic syndrome, type 2; 600995; PDCN
- Nephrotic syndrome, type 3; 610725; PLCE1
- Nephrotic syndrome, type 4; 256370; WT1
- Netherton syndrome; 256500; SPINK5
- Neural tube defect; 182940; VANGL1
- Neuroblastoma; 256700; NME1
- Neurodegeneration due to cerebral folate transport deficiency; 613068; FOLR1
- Neurodegeneration with brain iron accumulation 1; 234200; PANK2
- Neurodegeneration with brain iron accumulation 2B; 610217; PLA2G6
- Neurodegeneration with brain iron accumulation 3; 606159; FTL
- Neuroepithelioma; 612219; EWSR1
- Neurofibromatosis, familial spinal; 162210; NF1
- Neurofibromatosis type 1; 162200; NF1
- Neurofibromatosis type 2; 101000; NF2
- Neurofibromatosis-Noonan syndrome; 601321; NF1
- Neuromuscular disease, congenital, with uniform type 1 fiber; 117000; RYR1
- Neuronopathy, distal hereditary motor, type IIC; 613376; HSPB3
- Neuronopathy, distal hereditary motor, type VI; 604320; IGHMBP2
- Neuropathy, congenital hypomyelinating, 1; 605253; EGR2
- Neuropathy, congenital hypomyelinating; 605253; MPZ
- Neuropathy, distal hereditary motor, type IIA; 158590; HSPB8
- Neuropathy, distal hereditary motor, type IIB; 608634; HSPB1
- Neuropathy, distal hereditary motor, type V; 600794; BSCL2
- Neuropathy, distal hereditary motor, type V; 600794; GARS
- Neuropathy, distal hereditary motor, type VIIB; 607641; DCTN1
- Neuropathy, hereditary sensory and autonomic, type 1; 162400; SPTLC1
- Neuropathy, hereditary sensory and autonomic, type II; 201300; WNK1
- Neuropathy, hereditary sensory and autonomic, type IIB; 613115; FAM134B
- Neuropathy, hereditary sensory and autonomic, type V; 608654; NGFB
- Neuropathy, hereditary sensory, with spastic paraplegia; 256840; CCT5
- Neuropathy, hereditary sensory/autonomic, type IC; 613640; SPTLC2
- Neuropathy, recurrent, with pressure palsies; 162500; PMP22
- Neutral lipid storage disease with myopathy; 610717; PNPLA2
- Neutropenia, nonimmune chronic idiopathic, of adults; 607847; GFI1
- Neutropenia, severe congenital, autosomal dominant 1; 202700; ELANE
- Neutropenia, severe congenital, autosomal dominant 2; 613107; GFI1
- Neutropenia, severe congenital, autosomal recessive 3; 610738; HAX1
- Neutropenia, severe congenital, autosomal recessive 4; 612541; G6PC3
- Neutropenia, severe congenital, X-linked; 300299; WAS
- Neutrophil immunodeficiency syndrome; 608203; RAC2
- Neutrophilia, hereditary; 162830; CSF3R
- Nevo syndrome; 601451; PLOD1
- Nevus, epidermal; 162900; PIK3CA
- Nevus, epidermal, epidermolytic hyperkeratotic type; 600648; KRT10
- Nevus, keratinocytic, nonepidermolytic; 162900; FGFR3
- Newfoundland rod-cone dystrophy; 607476; RLBP1
- Niemann–Pick disease, type A; 257200; SMPD1
- Niemann–Pick disease, type B; 607616; SMPD1
- Niemann–Pick disease, type C1; 257220; NPC1
- Niemann–Pick disease, type C2; 607625; NPC2
- Niemann–Pick disease type D; 257220; NPC1
- Night blindness, congenital stationary, autosomal dominant 2; 163500; PDE6B
- Night blindness, congenital stationary, autosomal dominant 3; 610444; GNAT1
- Night blindness, congenital stationary, type 1; 310500; CSNB1
- Night blindness, congenital stationary, type 1B; 257270; GRM6
- Night blindness, congenital stationary, type 2B; 610427; CABP4
- Night blindness, congenital stationary, type IC; 613216; TRPM1
- Night blindness, congenital stationary, X-linked, type 2A; 300071; CACNA1F
- Night blindness, congenital stationary, autosomal dominant 1; 610445; RHO
- Nijmegen breakage syndrome; 251260; NBS1
- Nijmegen breakage syndrome-like disorder; 613078; RAD50
- Nonaka myopathy; 605820; GNE
- Non-Hodgkin lymphoma, somatic; 605027; CASP10
- Nonsmall cell lung cancer, response to tyrosine kinase inhibitor in; 211980; EGFR
- Nonsmall cell lung cancer, somatic; 211980; IRF1
- Nonsmall cell lung cancer, somatic; 211980; PIK3CA
- Noonan syndrome 1; 163950; PTPN11
- Noonan syndrome 3; 609942; KRAS
- Noonan syndrome 4; 610733; SOS1
- Noonan syndrome 5; 611553; RAF1
- Noonan syndrome 6; 613224; NRAS
- Noonan-like syndrome with loose anagen hair; 607721; SHOC2
- Norrie disease; 310600; NDP
- Norum disease; 245900; LCAT
- Nystagmus 1, congenital, X-linked; 310700; FRMD7
- Nystagmus 6, congenital, X-linked; 300814; GPR143
- Obesity with impaired prohormone processing; 600955; PCSK1
- Obesity, adrenal insufficiency, and red hair due to POMC deficiency; 609734; POMC
- Obesity, autosomal dominant; 601665; MC4R
- Obesity, mild, early-onset; 601665; NR0B2
- Obesity, severe; 601665; PPARG
- Obesity, severe; 601665; SIM1
- Occipital horn syndrome; 304150; ATP7A
- Ocular albinism, type I, Nettleship-Falls type; 300500; GPR143
- Oculoauricular syndrome; 612109; HMX1
- Oculocutaneous albinism, type IV; 606574; SLC45A2
- Oculodentodigital dysplasia; 164200; GJA1
- Oculodentodigital dysplasia, autosomal recessive; 257850; GJA1
- Oculopharyngeal muscular dystrophy; 164300; PABPN1
- Odontohypophosphatasia; 146300; ALPL
- Odontoonychodermal dysplasia; 257980; WNT10A
- Ogden syndrome; 300855; NAA10
- Oguchi disease-1; 258100; SAG
- Oguchi disease-2; 613411; GRK1
- OI type II; 166210; COL1A1
- OI type III; 259420; COL1A1
- OI type IV; 166220; COL1A1
- Oligodontia-colorectal cancer syndrome; 608615; AXIN2
- Omenn syndrome; 603554; DCLRE1C
- Omenn syndrome; 603554; RAG1
- Omenn syndrome; 603554; RAG2
- Omodysplasia 1; 258315; GPC6
- Opitz G syndrome, type I; 300000; MID1
- Opitz–Kaveggia syndrome; 305450; MED12
- Opremazole poor metabolizer; 609535; CYP2C
- Optic atrophy 1; 165500; OPA1
- Optic atrophy and cataract; 165300; OPA3
- Optic atrophy and deafness; 125250; OPA1
- Optic atrophy-7; 612989; TMEM126A
- Optic nerve coloboma with renal disease; 120330; PAX2
- Optic nerve hypoplasia and abnormalities of the central nervous system; 206900; SOX2
- Optic nerve hypoplasia; 165550; PAX6
- Oral-facial-digital syndrome 1; 311200; OFD1
- Ornithine transcarbamylase deficiency; 311250; OTC
- Orofacial cleft 11; 600625; BMP4
- Orofacial cleft 5; 608874; MSX1
- Orofacial cleft 6; 608864; IRF6
- Orofacial cleft 7; 225060; HVEC
- Orofacial cleft 8; 129400; TP63
- Orthostatic intolerance; 604715; SLC6A2
- Osseous heteroplasia, progressive; 166350; GNAS
- Ossification of posterior longitudinal ligament of spine; 602475; ENPP1
- Osteoarthritis with mild chondrodysplasia; 604864; COL2A1
- Osteochondritis dissecans, short stature, and early-onset osteoarthritis; 165800; ACAN
- Osteogenesis imperfecta, type I; 166200; COL1A1
- Osteogenesis imperfecta, type II; 166210; COL1A2
- Osteogenesis imperfecta, type IIB; 610854; CRTAP
- Osteogenesis imperfecta, type III; 259420; COL1A2
- Osteogenesis imperfecta, type IV; 166220; COL1A2
- Osteogenesis imperfecta, type IX; 259440; PPIB
- Osteogenesis imperfecta, type VI; 610698; FKBP10
- Osteogenesis imperfecta, type VII; 610682; CRTAP
- Osteogenesis imperfecta, type VIII; 610915; LEPRE1
- Osteoglophonic dysplasia; 166250; FGFR1
- Osteolysis, familial expansile; 174810; TNFRSF11A
- Osteopathia striata with cranial sclerosis; 300373; FAM123B
- Osteopetrosis, AD type I; 607634; LRP5
- Osteopetrosis, autosomal dominant 2; 166600; CLCN7
- Osteopetrosis, autosomal recessive 2; 259710; TNFSF11
- Osteopetrosis, autosomal recessive 3, with renal tubular acidosis; 259730; CA2
- Osteopetrosis, autosomal recessive 4; 611490; CLCN7
- Osteopetrosis, autosomal recessive 5; 259720; OSTM1
- Osteopetrosis, autosomal recessive 6; 611497; PLEKHM1
- Osteopetrosis, autosomal recessive 7; 612301; TNFRSF11A
- Osteopetrosis, recessive 1; 259700; TCIRG1
- Osteopoikilosis; 166700; LEMD3
- Osteoporosis, involutional; 166710; VDR
- Osteoporosis-pseudoglioma syndrome; 259770; LRP5
- Osteosarcoma; 259500; LOH18CR1
- Osteosarcoma; 259500; RB1
- Osteosarcoma; 259500; TP53
- Osteosarcoma, somatic; 259500; CHEK2
- Osteosclerosis; 144750; LRP5
- Otofaciocervical syndrome; 166780; EYA1
- Otopalatodigital syndrome, type I; 311300; FLNA
- Otopalatodigital syndrome, type II; 304120; FLNA
- Otospondylomegaepiphyseal dysplasia; 215150; COL11A2
- Ovarian cancer; 167000; CTNNB1
- Ovarian cancer, somatic; 604370; AKT1
- Ovarian cancer, somatic; 604370; PIK3CA
- Ovarian dysgenesis 1; 233300; FSHR
- Ovarian dysgenesis 2; 300510; BMP15
- Ovarian hyperstimulation syndrome; 608115; FSHR
- Ovarian response to FSH stimulation; 276400; FSHR
- Ovarioleukodystrophy; 603896; EIF2B2
- Ovarioleukodystrophy; 603896; EIF2B4
- Ovarioleukodystrophy; 603896; EIF2B5
- Pachyonychia congenita Jackson Lawler type; 167210; KRT17
- Pachyonychia congenita Jackson Lawler type; 167210; KRT6B
- Pachyonychia congenita, Jadassohn-Lewandowsky type; 167200; KRT16
- Pachyonychia congenita, Jadassohn-Lewandowsky type; 167200; KRT6A
- Paget disease of bone; 602080; PDB4 (non-gene locus)
- Paget disease of bone; 602080; SQSTM1
- Paget disease of bone; 602080; TNFRSF11A
- Paget disease, juvenile; 239000; TNFRSF11B
- Pallister–Hall syndrome; 146510; GLI3
- Palmoplantar hyperkeratosis and true hermaphroditism; 610644; RSPO1
- Palmoplantar hyperkeratosis with squamous cell carcinoma of skin and sex reversal; 610644; RSPO1
- Palmoplantar keratoderma, nonepidermolytic; 600962; KRT16
- Palmoplantar keratoderma, nonepidermolytic, focal; 613000; KRT16
- Palmoplantar verrucous nevus, unilateral; 144200; KRT16
- Pancreatic agenesis; 260370; IPF1
- Pancreatic cancer; 260350; TP53
- Pancreatic cancer; 613347; BRCA2
- Pancreatic cancer/melanoma syndrome; 606719; CDKN2A
- Pancreatic carcinoma, somatic; 260350; KRAS
- Pancreatitis, hereditary; 167800; PRSS1
- Pancreatitis, hereditary; 167800; SPINK1
- Panhypopituitarism, X-linked; 312000; SOX3
- Papillon–Lefèvre syndrome; 245000; CTSC
- Paraganglioma and gastric stromal sarcoma; 606864; SDHB
- Paraganglioma and gastric stromal sarcoma; 606864; SDHC
- Paraganglioma and gastric stromal sarcoma; 606864; SDHD
- Paraganglioma, familial chromaffin, 4; 115310; SDHB
- Paragangliomas 2; 601650; SDHAF2
- Paragangliomas, familial nonchromaffin, 1, with or without deafness; 168000; SDHD
- Paragangliomas, familial nonchromaffin, 3; 605373; SDHC
- Paramyotonia congenita; 168300; SCN4A
- Parathyroid adenoma with cystic changes; 145001; HRPT2
- Parathyroid carcinoma; 608266; HRPT2
- Parietal foramina 1; 168500; MSX2
- Parietal foramina 2; 609597; ALX4
- Parietal foramina with cleidocranial dysplasia; 168550; MSX2
- Parkes Weber syndrome; 608355; RASA1
- Parkinson disease 11; 607688; GIGYF2
- Parkinson disease 13; 610297; HTRA2
- Parkinson disease 15, autosomal recessive; 260300; FBXO7
- Parkinson disease 4; 605543; SNCA
- Parkinson disease 6, early onset; 605909; PINK1
- Parkinson disease 7, autosomal recessive early-onset; 606324; DJ1
- Parkinson disease 9; 606693; ATP13A2
- Parkinson disease, juvenile, type 2; 600116; PRKN
- Parkinson disease-8; 607060; LRRK2
- Parkinsonism-dystonia, infantile; 613135; SLC6A3
- Paroxysmal extreme pain disorder; 167400; SCN9A
- Paroxysmal nocturnal hemoglobinuria, somatic; 300818; PIGA
- Paroxysmal nonkinesigenic dyskinesia; 118800; MR1
- Partington syndrome; 309510; ARX
- PCWH syndrome; 609136; SOX10
- Peeling skin syndrome, acral type; 609796; TGM5
- Pelger–Huët anomaly; 169400; LBR
- Pelizaeus–Merzbacher disease; 312080; PLP1
- Pendred syndrome; 274600; SLC26A4
- Pentosuria; 260800; DCXR
- Periodic fever, familial; 142680; TNFRSF1A
- Periodontitis, juvenile; 170650; CTSC
- Periventricular heterotopia with microcephaly; 608097; ARFGEF2
- Peroxisomal acyl-CoA oxidase deficiency; 264470; ACOX1
- Perry syndrome; 168605; DCTN1
- Persistent Müllerian duct syndrome, type I; 261550; AMH
- Persistent Müllerian duct syndrome, type II; 261550; AMHR2
- Persistent truncus arteriosus; 217095; NKX2-6
- Peters anomaly; 604229; CYP1B1
- Peters anomaly; 604229; PAX6
- Peters anomaly; 604229; PITX2
- Peters-plus syndrome; 261540; B3GLCT
- Peutz–Jeghers syndrome; 175200; STK11
- Pfeiffer syndrome; 101600; FGFR1
- Pfeiffer syndrome; 101600; FGFR2
- Phenylketonuria; 261600; PAH
- Pheochromocytoma; 171300; KIF1B
- Pheochromocytoma; 171300; RET
- Pheochromocytoma; 171300; SDHB
- Pheochromocytoma; 171300; SDHD
- Pheochromocytoma; 171300; VHL
- Phosphoglycerate dehydrogenase deficiency; 601815; PHGDH
- Phosphoglycerate kinase 1 deficiency; 300653; PGK1
- Phosphoribosylpyrophosphate synthetase superactivity; 300661; PRPS1
- Phosphorylase kinase deficiency of liver and muscle, autosomal recessive; 261750; PHKB
- Phosphoserine aminotransferase deficiency; 610992; PSAT1
- Pick disease; 172700; MAPT
- Pick disease; 172700; PSEN1
- Piebaldism; 172800; SNAI2
- Pierson syndrome; 609049; LAMB2
- Pigmented adrenocortical disease, primary, 1; 610489; PRKAR1A
- Pigmented nodular adrenocortical disease, primary, 2; 610475; PDE11A
- Pigmented paravenous chorioretinal atrophy; 172870; CRB1
- Pilomatricoma; 132600; CTNNB1
- Pitt–Hopkins-like syndrome 1; 610042; CNTNAP2
- Pitt–Hopkins syndrome; 610954; TCF4
- Pituitary adenoma, ACTH-secreting; 219090; AIP
- Pituitary adenoma, growth hormone-secreting; 102200; AIP
- Pituitary adenoma, prolactin-secreting; 600634; AIP
- Pituitary hormone deficiency, combined, 1; 613038; POU1F1
- Pituitary hormone deficiency, combined, 2; 262600; PROP1
- Pituitary hormone deficiency, combined, 3; 221750; LHX3
- Pituitary hormone deficiency, combined, 4; 262700; LHX4
- Pituitary hormone deficiency, combined, 5; 182230; HESX1
- Plamoplantar keratoderma, epidermolytic; 144200; KRT1
- Plasminogen activator inhibitor, type I; 613329; PAI1
- Platelet disorder, familial, with associated myeloid malignancy; 601399; RUNX1
- Platelet glycoprotein IV deficiency; 608404; CD36
- Pleuropulmonary blastoma; 601200; DICER1
- Pneumothorax, primary spontaneous; 173600; FLCN
- Poikiloderma with neutropenia; 604173; C16orf57
- Polycystic kidney and hepatic disease; 263200; FCYT
- Polycystic kidney disease 2; 613095; PKD2
- Polycystic kidney disease, adult type I; 173900; PKD1
- Polycystic liver disease; 174050; PRKCSH
- Polycystic liver disease; 174050; SEC63
- Polyendocrine metabolic ovarian syndrome (PMOS); 184700; FST
- Polycythemia vera; 263300; JAK2
- Polycythemia, benign familial; 263400; VHL
- Polydactyly, postaxial, types A1 and B; 174200; GLI3
- Polydactyly, preaxial type II; 174500; LMBR1
- Polydactyly, preaxial, type IV; 174700; GLI3
- Polyhydramnios, megalencephaly, and symptomatic epilepsy; 611087; STRADA
- Polymicrogyria with optic nerve hypoplasia; 613180; TUBA8
- Polymicrogyria, asymmetric; 610031; TUBB2B
- Polymicrogyria, bilateral frontoparietal; 606854; GPR56
- Polyposis syndrome, hereditary mixed, 2; 610069; BMPR1A
- Polyposis, juvenile intestinal; 174900; BMPR1A
- Polyposis, juvenile intestinal; 174900; MADH4
- Pontocerebellar hypoplasia type 1; 607596; VRK1
- Pontocerebellar hypoplasia type 2A; 277470; TSEN54
- Pontocerebellar hypoplasia type 2B; 612389; TSEN2
- Pontocerebellar hypoplasia type 2C; 612390; TSEN34
- Pontocerebellar hypoplasia type 4; 225753; TSEN54
- Pontocerebellar hypoplasia, type 6; 611523; RARS2
- Popliteal pterygium syndrome; 119500; IRF6
- POR deficiency; 201750; POR
- Porencephaly; 175780; COL4A1
- Porokeratosis, disseminated superficial actinic, 1; 175900; SART3
- Porphyria cutanea tarda; 176100; UROD
- Porphyria variegata; 176200; PPOX
- Porphyria, acute hepatic; 612740; ALAD
- Porphyria, acute intermittent; 176000; HMBS
- Porphyria, acute intermittent, nonerythroid variant; 176000; HMBS
- Porphyria, congenital erythropoietic; 263700; UROS
- Porphyria, hepatoerythropoietic; 176100; UROD
- Prader–Willi syndrome; 176270; NDN
- Prader–Willi syndrome; 176270; SNRPN
- Precocious puberty, central; 176400; KISS1R
- Precocious puberty, male; 176410; LHCGR
- Premature chromosome condensation with microcephaly and mental retardation; 606858; MCPH1
- Premature ovarian failure 2B; 300604; FLJ22792
- Premature ovarian failure 3; 608996; FOXL2
- Premature ovarian failure 4; 300510; BMP15
- Premature ovarian failure 5; 611548; NOBOX
- Premature ovarian failure 6; 612310; FIGLA
- Premature ovarian failure 7; 612964; NR5A1
- Premature ovarian failure; 300511; DIAPH2
- Primary lateral sclerosis, juvenile; 606353; ALS2
- Prion disease with protracted course; 606688; PRNP
- Progesterone resistance; 264080; PGR
- Progressive external ophthalmoplegia with mitochondrial DNA deletions 3; 609283; SLC25A4
- Progressive external ophthalmoplegia with mitochondrial DNA deletions 3; 609286; C10orf2
- Progressive external ophthalmoplegia with mitochondrial DNA deletions, autosomal dominant 4; 610131; POLG2
- Progressive external ophthalmoplegia with mitochondrial DNA deletions, autosomal dominant, 5; 613077; RRM2B
- Progressive external ophthalmoplegia, autosomal dominant, with or without hypogonadism; 157640; POLG
- Progressive external ophthalmoplegia, autosomal recessive; 258450; POLG
- Progressive familial heart block, type IB; 604559; TRPM4
- Proguanil poor metabolizer; 609535; CYP2C
- Prolidase deficiency; 170100; PEPD
- Proliferative vasculopathy and hydraencephaly-hydrocephaly syndrome; 225790; FLVCR2
- Properdin deficiency, X-linked; 312060; CFP
- Propionicacidemia; 606054; PCCA
- Propionicacidemia; 606054; PCCB
- Prostate cancer 1, 176807; 601518; RNASEL
- Prostate cancer; 176807; BRCA2
- Prostate cancer, hereditary; 176807; MSR1
- Prostate cancer, progression and metastasis of; 603688; EPHB2
- Prostate cancer, somatic; 176807; KLF6
- Prostate cancer, somatic; 176807; MAD1L1
- Proteinuria, low molecular weight, with hypercalciuric nephrocalcinosis; 308990; CLCN5
- Protoporphyria, erythropoietic, autosomal dominant; 177000; FECH
- Protoporphyria, erythropoietic, autosomal recessive; 177000; FECH
- Protoporphyria, erythropoietic, X-linked dominant; 300752; ALAS2
- Proud syndrome; 300004; ARX
- Pseudoachondroplasia; 177170; COMP
- Pseudohermaphroditism, male, with gynecomastia; 264300; HSD17B3
- Pseudohyperkalemia, familial; 177720; PIEZO1
- Pseudohypoaldosteronism type I, autosomal dominant; 177735; NR3C2
- Pseudohypoaldosteronism type II; 145260; WNK4
- Pseudohypoaldosteronism, type I; 264350; SCNN1A
- Pseudohypoaldosteronism, type I; 264350; SCNN1B
- Pseudohypoaldosteronism, type I; 264350; SCNN1G
- Pseudohypoaldosteronism, type IIC; 145260; WNK1
- Pseudohypoparathyroidism Ia; 103580; GNAS
- Pseudohypoparathyroidism Ib; 603233; GNAS
- Pseudohypoparathyroidism Ic; 612462; GNAS
- Pseudohypoparathyroidism, type IB; 603233; GNAS-AS1
- Pseudohypoparathyroidism, type IB; 603233; STX16
- Pseudovaginal perineoscrotal hypospadias; 264600; SRD5A2
- Pseudoxanthoma elasticum; 264800; ABCC6
- Pseudoxanthoma elasticum, forme fruste; 177850; ABCC6
- Pseudoxanthoma elasticum-like disorder with multiple coagulation factor deficiency; 610842; GGCX
- Ptosis, congenital; 178300; ZFHX4
- Pulmonary alveolar microlithiasis; 265100; SLC34A2
- Pulmonary alveolar proteinosis; 300770; CSF2RA
- Pulmonary fibrosis, idiopathic; 178500; SFTPA2
- Pulmonary hypertension, familial primary; 178600; BMPR2
- Pulmonary hypertension, primary; 178600; MADH9
- Pulmonary hypertension, primary, fenfluramine-associated; 178600; BMPR2
- Pulmonary veno occlusive disease; 265450; BMPR2
- Pycnodysostosis; 265800; CTSK
- Pyogenic bacterial infections, recurrent, due to MYD88 deficiency; 612260; MYD88
- Pyogenic sterile arthritis, pyoderma gangrenosum, and acne; 604416; PSTPIP1
- Pyridoxamine 5'-phosphate oxidase deficiency; 610090; PNPO
- Pyropoikilocytosis; 266140; SPTA1
- Pyruvate carboxylase deficiency; 266150; PC
- Pyruvate dehydrogenase deficiency; 312170; PDHA1
- Pyruvate dehydrogenase E2 deficiency; 245348; DLAT
- Pyruvate dehydrogenase phosphatase deficiency; 608782; PDP1
- Pyruvate kinase deficiency; 266200; PKLR
- Rabson–Mendenhall syndrome; 262190; INSR
- Radioulnar synostosis with amegakaryocytic thrombocytopenia; 605432; HOXA11
- Raine syndrome; 259775; FAM20C
- RAPADILINO syndrome; 266280; RECQL4
- Rapp–Hodgkin syndrome; 129400; TP63
- Recombination rate QTL 1; 612042; RNF212
- Refsum disease; 266500; PEX7
- Refsum disease; 266500; PHYH
- Refsum disease, infantile form; 266510; PEX26
- Refsum disease, infantile form; 266510; PXMP3
- Refsum disease, infantile; 266510; PEX1
- Renal adysplasia; 191830; UPK3A
- Renal agenesis; 191830; RET
- Renal carcinoma, chromophobe, somatic; 144700; FLCN
- Renal cell carcinoma; 144700; DIRC2
- Renal cell carcinoma; 144700; HNF1A
- Renal cell carcinoma; 144700; RNF139
- Renal cell carcinoma, clear cell, somatic; 144700; OGG1
- Renal cell carcinoma, papillary, 1; 605074; PRCC
- Renal cell carcinoma, papillary, 1; 605074; TFE3
- Renal cell carcinoma, papillary, familial and sporadic; 605074; MET
- Renal cell carcinoma, somatic; 144700; VHL
- Renal cysts and diabetes syndrome; 137920; HNF1B
- Renal glucosuria; 233100; SLC5A2
- Renal tubular acidosis with deafness; 267300; ATP6B1
- Renal tubular acidosis, distal, AD; 179800; SLC4A1
- Renal tubular acidosis, distal, AR; 611590; SLC4A1
- Renal tubular acidosis, distal, autosomal recessive; 602722; ATP6V0A4
- Renal tubular acidosis, proximal, with ocular abnormalities; 604278; SLC4A4
- Renal tubular dysgenesis; 267430; ACE
- Renal tubular dysgenesis; 267430; AGT
- Renal tubular dysgenesis; 267430; AGTR1
- Renal tubular dysgenesis; 267430; REN
- Renal-hepatic-pancreatic dysplasia; 208540; NPHP3
- Renpenning syndrome; 309500; PQBP1
- Restrictive dermopathy, lethal; 275210; ZMPSTE24
- Reticular dysgenesis; 267500; AK2
- Retinal cone dystrophy 3; 610024; PDE6H
- Retinal cone dystrophy 3B; 610356; KCNV2
- Retinal cone dystrophy 4; 610478; CACNA2D4
- Retinal degeneration, late-onset, autosomal dominant; 605670; C1QTNF5
- Retinal dystrophy, early-onset severe; 248200; ABCA4
- Retinal dystrophy, early-onset severe; 613341; LRAT
- Retinitis pigmentosa 33; 610359; SNRNP200
- Retinitis pigmentosa 51; 613464; TTC8
- Retinitis pigmentosa 54; 613428; C2orf71
- Retinitis pigmentosa 55; 613575; ARL6
- Retinitis pigmentosa 58; 613617; ZNF513
- Retinitis pigmentosa, concentric; 613194; BEST1
- Retinitis pigmentosa, digenic; 608133; PRPH2
- Retinitis pigmentosa, juvenile; 613341; LRAT
- Retinitis pigmentosa, juvenile, autosomal recessive; 268000; SPATA7
- Retinitis pigmentosa, late-onset dominant; 268000; CRX
- Retinitis pigmentosa, X-linked, and sinorespiratory infections, with or without deafness; 300455; RPGR
- Retinitis pigmentosa-1; 180100; RP1
- Retinitis pigmentosa-10; 180105; IMPDH1
- Retinitis pigmentosa-11; 600138; PRPF31
- Retinitis pigmentosa-12, autosomal recessive; 600105; CRB1
- Retinitis pigmentosa-13; 600059; PRPF8
- Retinitis pigmentosa-14; 600132; TULP1
- Retinitis pigmentosa-17; 600852; CA4
- Retinitis pigmentosa-18; 601414; HPRP3
- Retinitis pigmentosa-19; 601718; ABCA4
- Retinitis pigmentosa-2; 312600; RP2
- Retinitis pigmentosa-25; 602772; EYS
- Retinitis pigmentosa-26; 608380; CERKL
- Retinitis pigmentosa-3; 300029; RPGR
- Retinitis pigmentosa-30; 607921; FSCN2
- Retinitis pigmentosa-31; 609923; TOPORS
- Retinitis pigmentosa-35; 610282; SEMA4A
- Retinitis pigmentosa-36; 610599; PRCD
- Retinitis pigmentosa-37; 611131; NR2E3
- Retinitis pigmentosa-38; 268000; MERTK
- Retinitis pigmentosa-39; 268000; USH2A
- Retinitis pigmentosa-41; 612095; PROM1
- Retinitis pigmentosa-42; 612943; KLHL7
- Retinitis pigmentosa-45; 268000; CNGB1
- Retinitis pigmentosa-50; 613194; BEST1
- Retinitis pigmentosa-7; 608133; PRPH2
- Retinitis pigmentosa-9; 180104; RP9
- Retinitis punctata albescens; 136880; PRPH2
- Retinitis punctata albescens; 136880; RLBP1
- Retinopathy of prematurity; 133780; FZD4
- Rett syndrome; 312750; MECP2
- Rett syndrome, congenital variant; 613454; FOXG1B
- Rett syndrome, preserved speech variant; 312750; MECP2
- Revesz syndrome; 268130; TINF2
- Reynolds syndrome; 613471; LBR
- Rhabdoid predisposition syndrome 1; 609322; SMARCB1
- Rhabdoid tumor predisposition syndrome 2; 613325; SMARCA4
- Rhabdomyosarcoma 2, alveolar; 268220; PAX3
- Rhabdomyosarcoma 2, alveolar; 268220; PAX7
- Rhabdomyosarcoma; 268210; SLC22A1L
- Rhabdomyosarcoma, alveolar; 268220; FOXO1A
- Rhizomelic chondrodysplasia punctata type 1; 215100; PEX7
- Rhizomelic chondrodysplasia punctata type 3; 600121; AGPS
- Ribose-5-phosphate isomerase deficiency; 608611; RPIA
- Rickets due to defect in vitamin D 25-hydroxylation; 600081; CYP2R1
- Rickets, vitamin D-resistant, type IIA; 277440; VDR
- RIDDLE syndrome; 611943; RNF168
- Rieger or Axenfeld anomalies; 602482; FOXC1
- Ring dermoid of cornea; 180550; PITX2
- Rippling muscle disease; 606072; CAV3
- Rippling muscle disease-1; 606072; RMD1 (non-gene locus)
- Roberts syndrome; 268300; ESCO2
- Robinow syndrome, autosomal recessive; 268310; ROR2
- Rolandic epilepsy, mental retardation, and speech dyspraxia; 300643; SRPX2
- Rothmund–Thomson syndrome; 268400; RECQL4
- Roussy–Lévy syndrome; 180800; MPZ
- Roussy–Lévy syndrome; 180800; PMP22
- Rubenstein-Taybi syndrome; 180849; CREBBP
- Rubinstein–Taybi syndrome; 180849; EP300
- Saccharopinuria; 268700; AASS
- Saethre–Chotzen syndrome with eyelid anomalies; 101400; TWIST1
- Saethre–Chotzen syndrome; 101400; FGFR2
- Saethre–Chotzen syndrome; 101400; TWIST1
- Salla disease; 604369; SLC17A5
- Sandhoff disease, infantile, juvenile, and adult forms; 268800; HEXB
- Sanfilippo syndrome, type A; 252900; SGSH
- Sanfilippo syndrome, type B; 252920; NAGLU
- Sanfilippo syndrome, type C; 252930; HGSNAT
- Sarcoidosis, early-onset; 609464; NOD2
- SC phocomelia syndrome; 269000; ESCO2
- Scapuloperoneal myopathy, X-linked dominant; 300695; FHL1
- Scapuloperoneal spinal muscular atrophy; 181405; TRPV4
- Scapuloperoneal syndrome, myopathic type; 181430; MYH7
- Scapuloperoneal syndrome, neurogenic, Kaeser type; 181400; DES
- Schimke immunoosseous dysplasia; 242900; SMARCAL1
- Schindler disease, type I; 609241; NAGA
- Schindler disease, type III; 609241; NAGA
- Schinzel–Giedion midface retraction syndrome; 269150; SETBP1
- Schizencephaly; 269160; EMX2
- Schizophrenia; 181500; DISC2
- Schneckenbecken dysplasia; 269250; SLC35D1
- Schöpf–Schulz–Passarge syndrome; 224750; WNT10A
- Schwannomatosis; 162091; NF2
- Schwartz–Jampel syndrome, type 1; 255800; HSPG2
- Sclerosteosis; 269500; SOST
- Sea-blue histiocyte disease; 269600; APOE
- Sebastian syndrome; 605249; MYH9
- Seborrhea-like dermatitis with psoriasiform elements; 610227; ZNF750
- Seckel syndrome 1; 210600; ATR
- SED congenita; 183900; COL2A1
- Segawa syndrome, recessive; 605407; TH
- Self-healing collodion baby; 242300; TGM1
- SEMD, Pakistani type; 612847; PAPSS2
- Senior–Loken syndrome 4; 606996; NPHP4
- Senior–Loken syndrome 5; 609254; IQCB1
- Senior–Loken syndrome 6; 610189; CEP290
- Senior–Loken syndrome-1; 266900; NPHP1
- Sensorineural deafness with mild renal dysfunction; 602522; BSND
- Sensory ataxic neuropathy, dysarthria, and ophthalmoparesis; 607459; POLG
- Septo-optic dysplasia; 182230; HESX1
- SERKAL syndrome; 611812; WNT4
- Sertoli cell-only syndrome; 400042; ZNF148
- SESAME syndrome; 612780; KCNJ10
- Severe combined immunodeficiency due to ADA deficiency; 102700; ADA
- Severe combined immunodeficiency with microcephaly, growth retardation, and sensitivity to ionizing radiation; 611291; NHEJ1
- Severe combined immunodeficiency, Athabascan type; 602450; DCLRE1C
- Severe combined immunodeficiency, B cell-negative; 601457; RAG1
- Severe combined immunodeficiency, B cell-negative; 601457; RAG2
- Severe combined immunodeficiency, T cell-negative, B-cell/natural killer-cell positive; 608971; CD3D
- Severe combined immunodeficiency, T cell-negative, B-cell/natural killer-cell positive; 608971; CD3E
- Severe combined immunodeficiency, T cell-negative, B-cell/natural killer-cell positive; 608971; PTPRC
- Severe combined immunodeficiency, T-cell negative, B-cell/natural killer cell-positive type; 608971; IL7R
- Severe combined immunodeficiency, X-linked; 300400; IL2RG
- Short QT syndrome-1; 609620; KCNH2
- Short QT syndrome-2; 609621; KCNQ1
- Short QT syndrome-3; 609622; KCNJ2
- Short rib-polydactyly syndrome, type III; 263510; DYNC2H1
- Short stature; 604271; GHSR
- Short stature, idiopathic familial; 300582; SHOX
- Short stature, idiopathic familial; 300582; SHOXY
- Short stature, idiopathic; 604271; GHR
- Shprintzen–Goldberg syndrome; 182212; FBN1
- Shwachman–Bodian–Diamond syndrome; 260400; SBDS
- Sialic acid storage disorder, infantile; 269920; SLC17A5
- Sialidosis, type I; 256550; NEU1
- Sialidosis, type II; 256550; NEU1
- Sialuria; 269921; GNE
- Sick sinus syndrome 1; 608567; SCN5A
- Sick sinus syndrome 2; 163800; HCN4
- Sickle cell anemia; 603903; HBB
- Silver spastic paraplegia syndrome; 270685; BSCL2
- Silver–Russell syndrome; 180860; H19
- Simpson-Golabi-Behmel syndrome, type 1; 312870; GPC3
- Simpson-Golabi-Behmel syndrome, type 2; 300209; OFD1
- Sitosterolemia; 210250; ABCG5
- Sitosterolemia; 210250; ABCG8
- Sjögren–Larsson syndrome; 270200; ALDH3A2
- Skeletal defects, genital hypoplasia, and mental retardation; 612447; ZBTB16
- Skin fragility-woolly hair syndrome; 607655; DSP
- Skin/hair/eye pigmentation 9, dark/light hair; 611742; ASIP
- Slowed nerve conduction velocity, AD; 608236; ARHGEF10
- Small patella syndrome; 147891; TBX4
- SMED, Strudwick type; 184250; COL2A1
- Smith–Lemli–Opitz syndrome; 270400; DHCR7
- Smith–Magenis syndrome; 182290; RAI1
- Smith–McCort dysplasia; 607326; DYM
- Snowflake vitreoretinal degeneration; 193230; KCNJ13
- Solitary median maxillary central incisor; 147250; SHH
- Somatostatin analog, resistance to; 102200; SSTR5
- Sorsby fundus dystrophy; 136900; TIMP3
- Sotos syndrome; 117550; NSD1
- Spastic ataxia, Charlevoix-Saguenay type; 270550; SACS
- Spastic paralysis, infantile onset ascending; 607225; ALS2
- Spastic paraplegia 10; 604187; KIF5A
- Spastic paraplegia 15; 270700; ZFYVE26
- Spastic paraplegia 31; 610250; REEP1
- Spastic paraplegia 33; 610244; ZFYVE27
- Spastic paraplegia 39; 612020; PNPLA6
- Spastic paraplegia, 44; 613206; GJC2
- Spastic paraplegia-11; 604360; SPG11
- Spastic paraplegia-13; 605280; HSPD1
- Spastic paraplegia-2; 312920; PLP1
- Spastic paraplegia-3A; 182600; SPG3A
- Spastic paraplegia-4; 182601; SPAST
- Spastic paraplegia-42; 612539; SLC33A1
- Spastic paraplegia-5A; 270800; CYP7B1
- Spastic paraplegia-6; 600363; NIPA1
- Spastic paraplegia-7; 607259; SPG7
- Spastic paraplegia-8; 603563; KIAA0196
- Specific granule deficiency; 245480; CEBPE
- Speech-language disorder-1; 602081; FOXP2
- Spherocytosis, hereditary, type 5; 612690; EPB42
- Spherocytosis, type 1; 182900; ANK1
- Spherocytosis, type 3; 270970; SPTA1
- Spherocytosis, type 4; 612653; SLC4A1
- Spinal and bulbar muscular atrophy of Kennedy; 313200; AR
- Spinal muscular atrophy, distal, autosomal recessive, 4; 611067; PLEKHG5
- Spinal muscular atrophy, distal, X-linked 3; 300489; ATP7A
- Spinal muscular atrophy, late-onset, Finkel type; 182980; VAPB
- Spinal muscular atrophy, X-linked 2, infantile; 301830; UBE1
- Spinal muscular atrophy-1; 253300; SMN1
- Spinal muscular atrophy-2; 253550; SMN1
- Spinal muscular atrophy-3; 253400; SMN1
- Spinal muscular atrophy-4; 271150; SMN1
- Spinocerebellar ataxia 12; 604326; PPP2R2B
- Spinocerebellar ataxia 14; 605361; PRKCG
- Spinocerebellar ataxia 15; 606658; ITPR1
- Spinocerebellar ataxia 17; 607136; TBP
- Spinocerebellar ataxia 28; 610246; AFG3L2
- Spinocerebellar ataxia 31; 117210; BEAN1
- Spinocerebellar ataxia 8; 608768; ATXN8OS
- Spinocerebellar ataxia 8; 608768; ATXN8
- Spinocerebellar ataxia with epilepsy; 607459; POLG
- Spinocerebellar ataxia, autosomal recessive 5; 606937; ZNF592
- Spinocerebellar ataxia, autosomal recessive 8; 610743; SYNE1
- Spinocerebellar ataxia, autosomal recessive 9; 612016; COQ8A
- Spinocerebellar ataxia, autosomal recessive with axonal neuropathy; 607250; TDP1
- Spinocerebellar ataxia, infantile-onset; 271245; TWNK
- Spinocerebellar ataxia-1; 164400; ATXN1
- Spinocerebellar ataxia-10; 603516; ATXN10
- Spinocerebellar ataxia-11; 604432; TTBK2
- Spinocerebellar ataxia-13; 605259; KCNC3
- Spinocerebellar ataxia-2; 183090; ATXN2
- Spinocerebellar ataxia-27; 609307; FGF14
- Spinocerebellar ataxia-5; 600224; SPTBN2
- Spinocerebellar ataxia-6; 183086; CACNA1A
- Spinocerebellar ataxia-7; 164500; ATXN7
- Split-hand/foot malformation 6; 225300; WNT10B
- Split-hand/foot malformation, type 4; 605289; TP63
- Spondylocarpotarsal synostosis syndrome; 272460; FLNB
- Spondylocheirodysplasia, Ehlers-Danlos syndrome-like; 612350; SLC39A13
- Spondylocostal dysostosis, autosomal recessive 2; 608681; MESP2
- Spondylocostal dysostosis, autosomal recessive 3; 609813; LFNG
- Spondylocostal dysostosis, autosomal recessive, 1; 277300; DLL3
- Spondylocostal dystostosis 4, autosomal dominant; 122600; GDF6
- Spondyloepimetaphyseal dysplasia; 608728; MATN3
- Spondyloepimetaphyseal dysplasia, aggrecan type; 612813; ACAN
- Spondyloepimetaphyseal dysplasia, Missouri type; 602111; MMP13
- Spondyloepiphyseal dysplasia tarda with progressive arthropathy; 208230; WISP3
- Spondyloepiphyseal dysplasia tarda; 313400; TRAPPC2
- Spondyloepiphyseal dysplasia with congenital joint dislocations; 143095; CHST3
- Spondyloepiphyseal dysplasia, Kimberley type; 608361; ACAN
- Spondylo-megaepiphyseal-metaphyseal dysplasia; 613330; NKX3-2
- Spondylometaepiphyseal dysplasia, short limb-hand type; 271665; DDR2
- Spondylometaphyseal dysplasia, Kozlowski type; 184252; TRPV4
- Spondyloperipheral dysplasia; 271700; COL2A1
- Squamous cell carcinoma, head and neck; 275355; ING1
- Squamous cell carcinoma, head and neck; 275355; TNFRSF10B
- Stapes ankylosis with broad thumb and toes; 184460; NOG
- STAR syndrome; 300707; FAM58A
- Stargardt disease 3; 600110; ELOVL4
- Stargardt disease 4; 603786; PROM1
- Stargardt disease-1; 248200; ABCA4
- Startle disease/hyperekplexia, autosomal dominant; 149400; GLRA1
- Steatocystoma multiplex; 184500; KRT17
- Stickler syndrome, type I; 108300; COL2A1
- Stickler syndrome, type II; 604841; COL11A1
- Stickler syndrome, type III; 184840; COL11A2
- Stiff skin syndrome; 184900; FBN1
- Stocco dos Santos X-linked mental retardation syndrome; 300434; SHROOM4
- Stomach cancer; 137215; KRAS
- Stomatocytosis I; 185000; EPB72
- Striatal degeneration, autosomal dominant; 609161; PDE8B
- Striatonigral degeneration, infantile; 271930; NUP62
- Stuve–Wiedemann syndrome/Schwartz–Jampel type 2 syndrome; 601559; LIFR
- Subcortical laminal heteropia, X-linked; 300067; DCX
- Succinic semialdehyde dehydrogenase deficiency; 271980; ALDH5A1
- Succinyl-CoA:3-oxoacid CoA transferase deficiency; 245050; OXCT1
- Sucrase-isomaltase deficiency, congenital; 222900; SI
- Sudden infant death with dysgenesis of the testes syndrome; 608800; TSPYL1
- Sulfite oxidase deficiency; 272300; SUOX
- Supranuclear palsy, progressive atypical; 260540; MAPT
- Supranuclear palsy, progressive; 601104; MAPT
- Supravalvar aortic stenosis; 185500; ELN
- Surfactant metabolism dysfunction, pulmonary, 1; 265120; SFTPB
- Surfactant metabolism dysfunction, pulmonary, 2; 610913; SFTPC
- Surfactant metabolism dysfunction, pulmonary, 3; 610921; ABCA3
- Sveinsson choreoretinal atrophy; 108985; TEAD1
- Symphalangism, proximal; 185800; GDF5
- Symphalangism, proximal; 185800; NOG
- Syndactyly, type III; 186100; GJA1
- Syndactyly, type IV; 186200; LMBR1
- Syndactyly, type V; 186300; HOXD13
- Synostoses syndrome, multiple, 1; 186500; NOG
- Synpolydactyly with foot anomalies; 186000; HOXD13
- Synpolydactyly, 3/3'4, associated with metacarpal and metatarsal synostoses; 608180; FBLN1
- Synpolydactyly, type II; 186000; HOXD13
- Tangier disease; 205400; ABCA1
- TARP syndrome; 311900; RBM10
- Tarsal-carpal coalition syndrome; 186570; NOG
- Tay–Sachs disease; 272800; HEXA
- T-cell immunodeficiency, congenital alopecia, and nail dystrophy; 601705; FOXN1
- Testicular microlithiasis; 610441; SLC34A2
- Testicular tumor, sporadic; 273300; STK11
- Tetra-amelia, autosomal recessive; 273395; WNT3
- Tetralogy of Fallot; 187500; GDF1
- Tetralogy of Fallot; 187500; JAG1
- Tetralogy of Fallot; 187500; ZFPM2
- Tetrology of Fallot; 187500; NKX2E
- Thalassemia, alpha-; 604131; HBA2
- Thalassemia, Hispanic gamma-delta-beta; 604131; LCRB
- Thalassemia-beta, dominant inclusion-body; 603902; HBB
- Thalassemias, alpha-; 604131; HBA1
- Thalassemias, beta-; 604131; HBB
- Thanatophoric dysplasia, type I; 187600; FGFR3
- Thiamine-responsive megaloblastic anemia syndrome; 249270; SLC19A2
- Three M syndrome 2; 612921; OBSL1
- Thrombocythemia, essential; 187950; JAK2
- Thrombocythemia, essential; 187950; MPL
- Thrombocythemia, essential; 187950; THPO
- Thrombocytopenia 4; 612004; CYCS
- Thrombocytopenia with beta-thalassemia, X-linked; 314050; GATA1
- Thrombocytopenia, congenital amegakaryocytic; 604498; MPL
- Thrombocytopenia, X-linked; 313900; WAS
- Thrombocytopenia, X-linked, intermittent; 313900; WAS
- Thrombocytopenia-2; 188000; FLJ14813
- Thrombocytopenic purpura, autoimmune; 188030; FCGR2C
- Thrombophilia due to elevated HRG; 613116; HRG
- Thrombophilia due to heparin cofactor II deficiency; 612356; HCF2
- Thrombophilia due to HRG deficiency; 613116; HRG
- Thrombophilia due to protein C deficiency, autosomal dominant; 176860; PROC
- Thrombophilia due to protein C deficiency, autosomal recessive; 612304; PROC
- Thrombophilia due to protein S deficiency; 612336; PROS1
- Thrombophilia, familial, due to decreased release of PLAT; 612348; PLAT
- Thrombophilia, X-linked, due to factor IX defect; 300807; F9
- Thrombosis, hyperhomocysteinemic; 236200; CBS
- Thrombotic thrombocytopenic purpura, familial; 274150; ADAMTS13
- Thyroid dyshormonogenesis 6; 607200; DUOX2
- Thyroid carcinoma, follicular; 188470; MINPP1
- Thyroid carcinoma, follicular; 188470; NRAS
- Thyroid carcinoma, papillary; 188550; GOLGA5
- Thyroid carcinoma, papillary; 188550; NCOA4
- Thyroid carcinoma, papillary; 188550; PCM1
- Thyroid carcinoma, papillary; 188550; PRKAR1A
- Thyroid carcinoma, papillary; 188550; TRIM24
- Thyroid carcinoma, papillary; 188550; TRIM33
- Thyroid dyshormonogenesis 1; 274400; SLC5A5
- Thyroid dyshormonogenesis 2A; 274500; TPO
- Thyroid dyshormonogenesis 3; 274700; TG
- Thyroid dyshormonogenesis 4; 274800; IYD
- Thyroid dyshormonogenesis 5; 274900; DUOXA2
- Thyroid hormone metabolism, abnormal; 609698; SECISBP2
- Thyroid hormone resistance; 188570; THRB
- Thyroid hormone resistance, autosomal recessive; 274300; THRB
- Thyroid hormone resistance, selective pituitary; 145650; THRB
- Thyroid papillary carcinoma; 188550; CCDC6
- Tibial muscular dystrophy, tardive; 600334; TTN
- Tietz albinism-deafness syndrome; 103500; MITF
- Timothy syndrome; 601005; CACNA1C
- Tn syndrome; 300622; C1GALT1C1
- Toenail dystrophy, isolated; 607523; COL7A1
- Tooth agenesis, selective, 1, with or without orofacial cleft; 106600; MSX1
- Tooth agenesis, selective, 3; 604625; PAX9
- Tooth agenesis, selective, 6; 613097; LTBP3
- Tooth agenesis, selective, X-linked 1; 313500; ED1
- Torg–Winchester syndrome; 259600; MMP2
- Tourette syndrome; 137580; SLITRK1
- Townes–Brocks branchiootorenal-like syndrome; 107480; SALL1
- Townes–Brocks syndrome; 107480; SALL1
- Transaldolase deficiency; 606003; TALDO1
- Transcobalamin II deficiency; 275350; TCN2
- Transient bullous of the newborn; 131705; COL7A1
- Transposition of the great arteries, dextro-looped 1; 608808; MED13L
- Treacher Collins mandibulofacial dysostosis; 154500; TCOF1
- Trehalase deficiency; 612119; TREH
- Trichodentoosseous syndrome; 190320; DLX3
- Trichoepithelioma, multiple familial, 1; 601606; CYLD1
- Trichorhinophalangeal syndrome, type I; 190350; TRPS1
- Trichorhinophalangeal syndrome, type III; 190351; TRPS1
- Trichothiodystrophy; 601675; ERCC2
- Trichothiodystrophy; 601675; ERCC3
- Trichothiodystrophy, complementation group A; 601675; GTF2H5
- Trichothiodystrophy, nonphotosensitive 1; 234050; C7orf11
- Trichotillomania; 613229; SLITRK1
- Trifunctional protein deficiency; 609015; HADHA
- Trifunctional protein deficiency; 609015; HADHB
- Trigonocephaly; 190440; FGFR1
- Trimethylaminuria; 602079; FMO3
- Triphalangeal thumb, type I; 174500; LMBR1
- Triphalangeal thumb-polysyndactyly syndrome; 174500; LMBR1
- Trismus-pseudocamptodactyly syndrome; 158300; MYH8
- Tropical calcific pancreatitis; 608189; SPINK1
- Troyer syndrome; 275900; SPG20
- Tuberous sclerosis-1; 191100; TSC1
- Tuberous sclerosis-2; 191100; TSC2
- Tumoral calcinosis, familial, normophosphatemic; 610455; SAMD9
- Tumoral calcinosis, hyperphosphatemic; 211900; KL
- Tumoral calcinosis, hyperphosphatemic, familial; 211900; FGF23
- Tumoral calcinosis, hyperphosphatemic, familial; 211900; GALNT3
- Tyrosine kinase 2 deficiency; 611521; TYK2
- Tyrosinemia type II; 277660; TAT
- Tyrosinemia type III; 276710; HPD
- Ullrich congenital muscular dystrophy; 254090; COL6A1
- Ullrich congenital muscular dystrophy; 254090; COL6A2
- Ullrich congenital muscular dystrophy; 254090; COL6A3
- Ulna and fibula, absence of, with severe limb deficiency; 276820; WNT7A
- Ulnar–mammary syndrome; 181450; TBX3
- Urocanase deficiency; 276880; UROC1
- Urofacial syndrome; 236730; HPSE2
- Usher syndrome, type 1B; 276900; MYO7A
- Usher syndrome, type 1C; 276904; USH1C
- Usher syndrome, type 1D; 601067; CDH23
- Usher syndrome, type 1D/F digenic; 601067; CDH23
- Usher syndrome, type 1D/F digenic; 601067; PCDH15
- Usher syndrome, type 1F; 602083; PCDH15
- Usher syndrome, type 1G; 606943; USH1G
- Usher syndrome, type 2A; 276901; USH2A
- Usher syndrome, type 3; 276902; CLRN1
- Usher syndrome, type IIC; 605472; GPR98
- Usher syndrome, type IID; 611383; WHRN
- UV-sensitive syndrome; 600630; ERCC6
- VACTERL association; 192350; HOXD13
- Van Buchem disease; 239100; SOST
- van Buchem disease, type 2; 607636; LRP5
- van der Woude syndrome; 119300; IRF6
- Vasculopathy, retinal, with cerebral leukodystrophy; 192315; TREX1
- VATER association with macrocephaly and ventriculomegaly; 276950; PTEN
- Velocardiofacial syndrome; 192430; TBX1
- Venous malformations, multiple cutaneous and mucosal; 600195; TEK
- Ventricular fibrillation, familial, 1; 603829; SCN5A
- Ventricular fibrillation, paroxysmal familial, 2; 612956; DPP6
- Ventricular tachycardia, catecholaminergic polymorphic, 1; 604772; RYR2
- Ventricular tachycardia, catecholaminergic polymorphic, 2; 611938; CASQ2
- Ventricular tachycardia, idiopathic; 192605; GNAI2
- Vertical talus, congenital; 192950; HOXD10
- Vesicoureteral reflux 2; 610878; ROBO2
- VEXAS; 301054; UBA1
- Vitamin D-dependent rickets, type I; 264700; CYP27B1
- Vitamin K-dependent clotting factors, combined deficiency of, 2; 607473; VKORC1
- Vitamin K-dependent coagulation defect; 277450; GGCX
- Vitelliform macular dystrophy, adult-onset; 608161; BEST1
- Vitreoretinochoroidopathy; 193220; BEST1
- VLCAD deficiency; 201475; ACADVL
- Vohwinkel syndrome with ichthyosis; 604117; LOR
- Vohwinkel syndrome; 124500; GJB2
- von Hippel–Lindau disease, modification of; 193300; CCND1
- von Hippel–Lindau syndrome; 193300; VHL
- von Willebrand disease, autosomal dominant; 193400; VWF
- von Willebrand disease, autosomal recessive; 277480; VWF
- von Willebrand disease, platelet-type; 177820; GP1BA
- Waardenburg syndrome type 1; 193500; PAX3
- Waardenburg syndrome type 2D; 608890; SNAI2
- Waardenburg syndrome type 2E, with or without neurologic involvement; 611584; SOX10
- Waardenburg syndrome type 3; 148820; PAX3
- Waardenburg syndrome type 4A; 277580; EDNRB
- Waardenburg syndrome type 4B; 613265; EDN3
- Waardenburg syndrome type 4C; 613266; SOX10
- Waardenburg syndrome type IIA; 193510; MITF
- Waardenburg syndrome/albinism, digenic; 103470; TYR
- Waardenburg syndrome/ocular albinism, digenic; 103470; MITF
- Wagner syndrome 1; 143200; VCAN
- Warburg micro syndrome 1; 600118; RAB3GAP1
- Warfarin resistance; 122700; VKORC1
- Warfarin sensitivity; 122700; CYP2C9
- Warsaw breakage syndrome; 613398; DDX11
- Watson syndrome; 193520; NF1
- Weaver syndrome; 277590; NSD1
- Weill–Marchesani syndrome, dominant; 608328; FBN1
- Weill–Marchesani syndrome, recessive; 277600; ADAMTS10
- Weill–Marchesani-like syndrome; 613195; ADAMTS17
- Weissenbacher–Zweymüller syndrome; 277610; COL11A2
- Werner syndrome; 277700; RECQL2
- Weyers acrodental dysostosis; 193530; EVC
- WHIM syndrome; 193670; CXCR4
- White sponge nevus; 193900; KRT13
- White sponge nevus; 193900; KRT4
- Wilms' tumor 2; 194071; H19
- Wilms' tumor; 194070; BRCA2
- Wilms' tumor, somatic; 194070; GPC3
- Wilms' tumor, type 1; 194070; WT1
- Wilson's disease; 277900; ATP7B
- Wiskott–Aldrich syndrome; 301000; WAS
- Witkop syndrome; 189500; MSX1
- Wolcott–Rallison syndrome; 226980; EIF2AK3
- Wolff–Parkinson–White syndrome; 194200; PRKAG2
- Wolfram syndrome 2; 604928; CISD2
- Wolfram syndrome; 222300; WFS1
- Wolfram-like syndrome, autosomal dominant; 222300; WFS1
- Wolman disease; 278000; LIPA
- Woodhouse–Sakati syndrome; 241080; C2orf37
- Woolly hair, autosomal dominant; 194300; KRT74
- Woolly hair, autosomal recessive 1; 278150; P2RY5
- Woolly hair, autosomal recessive 2 with or without hypotrichosis; 604379; LIPH
- Wrinkly skin syndrome; 278250; ATP6V0A2
- Xanthinuria, type I; 278300; XDH
- Xeroderma pigmentosum group A; 278700; XPA
- Xeroderma pigmentosum group B; 610651; ERCC3
- Xeroderma pigmentosum group C; 278720; XPC
- Xeroderma pigmentosum group D; 278730; ERCC2
- Xeroderma pigmentosum group E, DDB-negative subtype; 278740; DDB2
- Xeroderma pigmentosum group F; 278760; ERCC4
- Xeroderma pigmentosum group G; 278780; ERCC5
- Xeroderma pigmentosum, variant type; 278750; POLH
- XFE progeroid syndrome; 610965; ERCC4
- X-inactivation, familial skewed; 300087; XIC
- Zellweger syndrome; 214100; PEX10
- Zellweger syndrome; 214100; PEX13
- Zellweger syndrome; 214100; PEX14
- Zellweger syndrome; 214100; PEX26
- Zellweger syndrome; 214100; PEX5
- Zellweger syndrome; 214100; PEX19
- Zellweger syndrome, complementation group G; 214100; PEX3
- Zellweger syndrome-1; 214100; PEX1
