= CRYBA4 =

Protein-coding gene in the species Homo sapiens

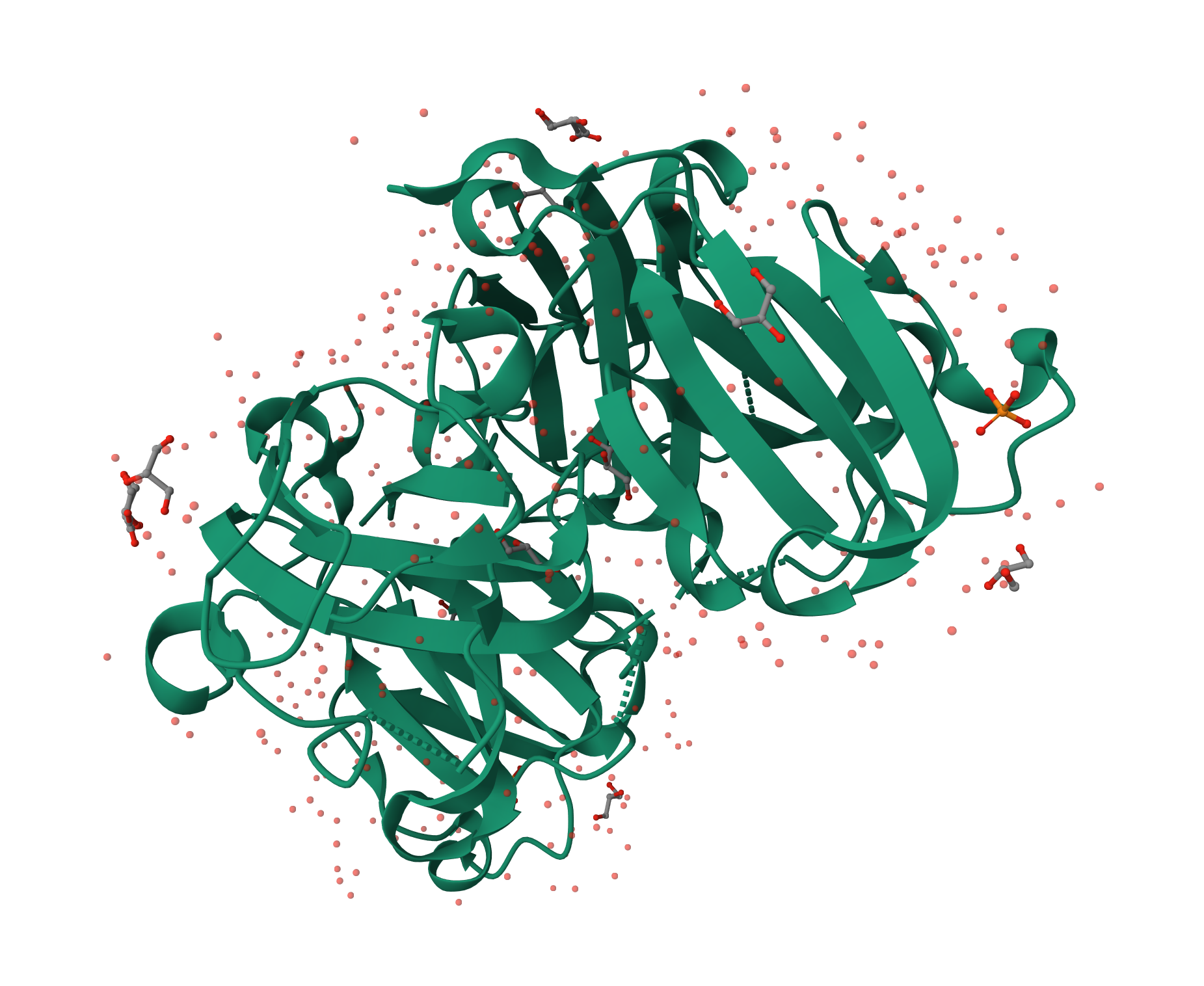

Identifiers
- Aliases: CRYBA4, CTRCT23, MCOPCT4, CYRBA4, crystallin beta A4
- External IDs: OMIM: 123631; MGI: 102716; GeneCards: CRYBA4
Available structures
PDB	Ortholog search: PDBe RCSB
PDB	List of PDB id codes 3LWK

Gene location (Human)
Chr.	Chromosome 22 (human)
Band	22q12.1	Start	26,621,963 bp
Band	22q12.1	End	26,630,669 bp

Gene location (Mouse)
Chr.	Chromosome 5 (mouse)
Band	5|5 F	Start	112,394,359 bp
Band	5|5 F	End	112,400,384 bp
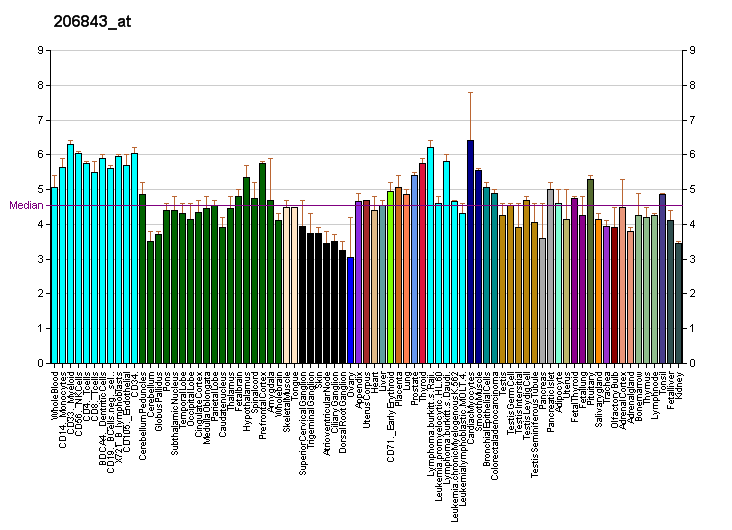
RNA expression pattern
Bgee	Human / Mouse (ortholog); Top expressed in: testicle; gonad; granulocyte; right testis; left testis; mucosa of transverse colon; spleen; prefrontal cortex; dorsolateral prefrontal cortex; cingulate gyrus / Top expressed in: lens; epithelium of lens; conjunctival fornix; ciliary body; retinal pigment epithelium; lip; neural layer of retina; granulocyte; hair follicle; embryo; More reference expression data
BioGPS	More reference expression data
Gene ontology
Molecular function	protein binding; structural constituent of eye lens; molecular function
Cellular component	cellular component
Biological process	camera-type eye development; visual perception; lens development in camera-type eye
Sources:Amigo / QuickGO
Orthologs
Databases	NCBI: entry; OMA: entry
Species	Human	Mouse
Entrez	1413	12959
Ensembl	ENSG00000196431	ENSMUSG00000066975
UniProt	P53673	Q9JJV0
RefSeq (mRNA)	NM_001886	NM_021351; NM_001312884
RefSeq (protein)	NP_001877; NP_001877.1	NP_001299813; NP_067326
Location (UCSC)	Chr 22: 26.62 – 26.63 Mb	Chr 5: 112.39 – 112.4 Mb
PubMed search
- Wikidata
View/Edit Human	View/Edit Mouse

Beta-crystallin A4 is a protein that in humans is encoded by the CRYBA4 gene.

Crystallins are separated into two classes: taxon-specific, or enzyme, and ubiquitous. The latter class constitutes the major proteins of vertebrate eye lens and maintains the transparency and refractive index of the lens. Since lens central fiber cells lose their nuclei during development, these crystallins are made and then retained throughout life, making them extremely stable proteins.

Mammalian lens crystallins are divided into alpha, beta, and gamma families; beta and gamma crystallins are also considered as a superfamily. Alpha and beta families are further divided into acidic and basic groups. Seven protein regions exist in crystallins: four homologous motifs, a connecting peptide, and N- and C-terminal extensions.

Beta-crystallins, the most heterogeneous, differ by the presence of the C-terminal extension (present in the basic group, none in the acidic group). Beta-crystallins form aggregates of different sizes and are able to self-associate to form dimers or to form heterodimers with other beta-crystallins. This gene, a beta acidic group member, is part of a gene cluster with beta-B1, beta-B2, and beta-B3.
