= CRYBB1 =

Protein-coding gene in the species Homo sapiens

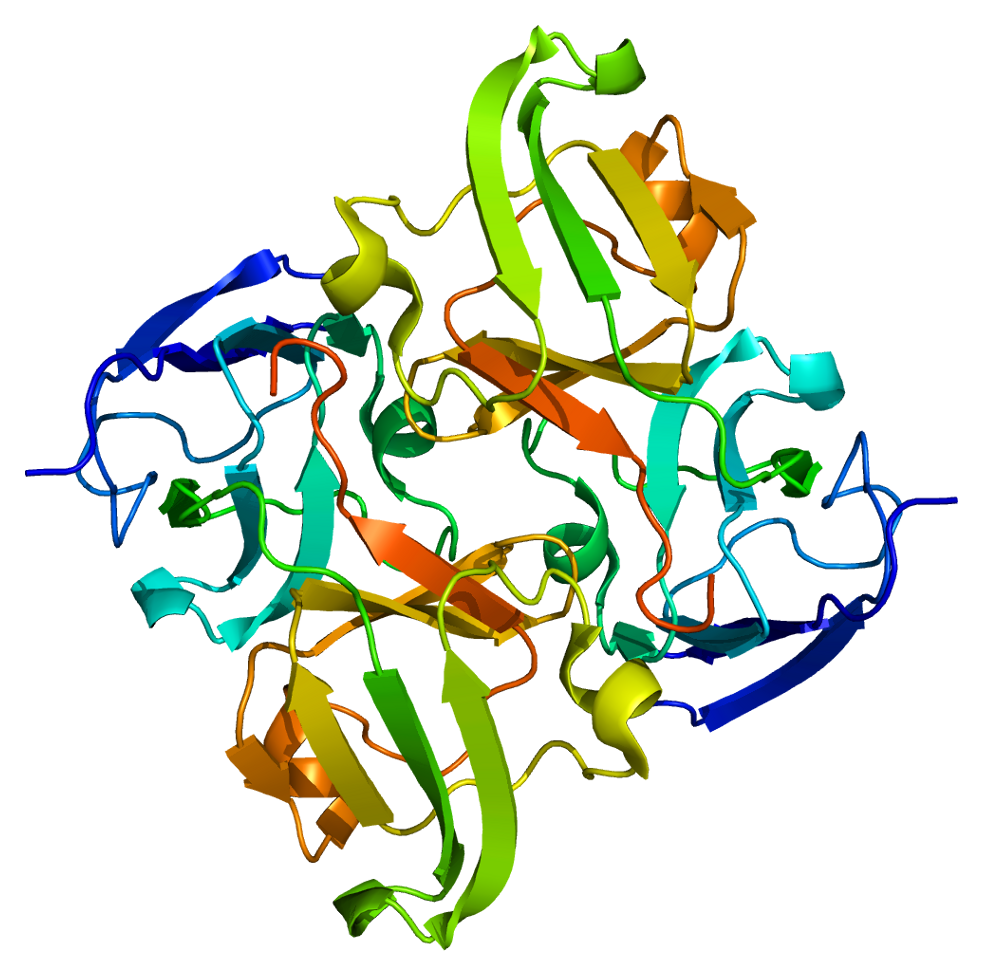

Identifiers
- Aliases: CRYBB1, CATCN3, CTRCT17, crystallin beta B1
- External IDs: OMIM: 600929; MGI: 104992; GeneCards: CRYBB1
Available structures
PDB	Ortholog search: PDBe RCSB
PDB	List of PDB id codes 1OKI

Gene location (Human)
Chr.	Chromosome 22 (human)
Band	22q12.1	Start	26,599,278 bp
Band	22q12.1	End	26,618,027 bp

Gene location (Mouse)
Chr.	Chromosome 5 (mouse)
Band	5 F|5 54.63 cM	Start	112,403,681 bp
Band	5 F|5 54.63 cM	End	112,417,451 bp
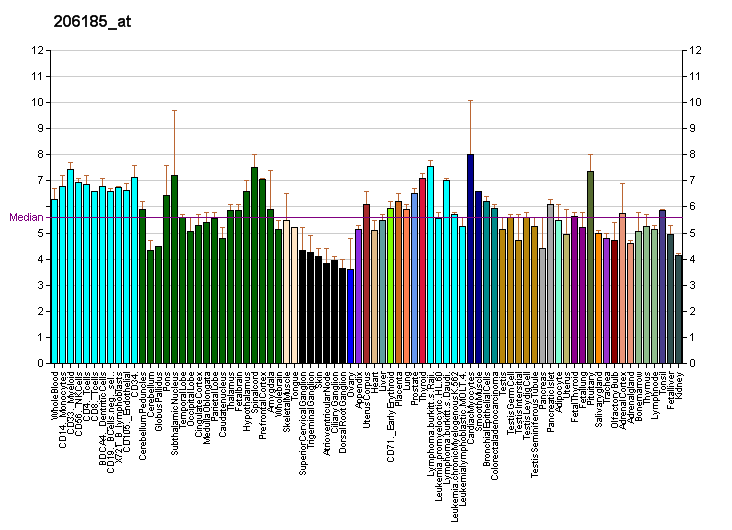
RNA expression pattern
Bgee	Human / Mouse (ortholog); Top expressed in: gonad; prefrontal cortex; appendix; right coronary artery; Brodmann area 9; spleen; gallbladder; corpus epididymis; right adrenal gland; right adrenal cortex / Top expressed in: lens; epithelium of lens; conjunctival fornix; retinal pigment epithelium; ciliary body; iris; cornea; masseter muscle; neural layer of retina; temporal muscle; More reference expression data
BioGPS	More reference expression data
Orthologs
Databases	NCBI: entry; OMA: entry
Species	Human	Mouse
Entrez	1414	12960
Ensembl	ENSG00000100122	ENSMUSG00000029343
UniProt	P53674	Q9WVJ5
RefSeq (mRNA)	NM_001887	NM_023695; NM_001312893; NM_001312894; NM_001312895
RefSeq (protein)	NP_001878	NP_001299822; NP_001299823; NP_001299824; NP_076184
Location (UCSC)	Chr 22: 26.6 – 26.62 Mb	Chr 5: 112.4 – 112.42 Mb
PubMed search
- Wikidata
View/Edit Human	View/Edit Mouse

Beta-crystallin B1 is a protein that in humans is encoded by the CRYBB1 gene. Variants in CRYBB1 are associated with autosomal dominant congenital cataract.

Crystallins are separated into two classes: taxon-specific, or enzyme, and ubiquitous. The latter class constitutes the major proteins of vertebrate eye lens and maintains the transparency and refractive index of the lens. Since lens central fiber cells lose their nuclei during development, these crystallins are made and then retained throughout life, making them extremely stable proteins.

Mammalian lens crystallins are divided into alpha, beta, and gamma families; beta and gamma crystallins are also considered as a superfamily. Alpha and beta families are further divided into acidic and basic groups. Seven protein regions exist in crystallins: four homologous motifs, a connecting peptide, and N- and C-terminal extensions.

Beta-crystallins, the most heterogeneous, differ by the presence of the C-terminal extension (present in the basic group, none in the acidic group). Beta-crystallins form aggregates of different sizes and are able to self-associate to form dimers or to form heterodimers with other beta-crystallins. This gene, a beta basic group member, undergoes extensive cleavage at its N-terminal extension during lens maturation. It is also a member of a gene cluster with beta-A4, beta-B2, and beta-B3.
