= C11orf52 =

Protein-coding gene in the species Homo sapiens

Identifiers
- Aliases: C11orf52, chromosome 11 open reading frame 52
- External IDs: MGI: 1914202; HomoloGene: 12059; GeneCards: C11orf52; OMA:C11orf52 - orthologs

Gene location (Human)
Chr.	Chromosome 11 (human)
Band	11q23.1	Start	111,918,032 bp
Band	11q23.1	End	111,926,871 bp

Gene location (Mouse)
Chr.	Chromosome 9 (mouse)
Band	9|9 A5.3	Start	50,650,991 bp
Band	9|9 A5.3	End	50,657,836 bp
RNA expression pattern
Bgee	Human / Mouse (ortholog); Top expressed in: body of pancreas; islet of Langerhans; right uterine tube; human kidney; olfactory zone of nasal mucosa; placenta; right lobe of liver; salivary gland; left lobe of thyroid gland; right lobe of thyroid gland / Top expressed in: right kidney; epithelium of stomach; epithelium of lens; proximal tubule; seminal vesicula; islet of Langerhans; human kidney; parotid gland; duodenum; decidua; More reference expression data
BioGPS	n/a
Orthologs
Species	Human	Mouse
Entrez	91894	66952
Ensembl	ENSG00000149300	ENSMUSG00000032062
UniProt	Q96A22	Q9D8L0
RefSeq (mRNA)	NM_080659	NM_025865
RefSeq (protein)	NP_542390	NP_080141
Location (UCSC)	Chr 11: 111.92 – 111.93 Mb	Chr 9: 50.65 – 50.66 Mb
PubMed search
- Wikidata
View/Edit Human	View/Edit Mouse

C11orf52 is an uncharacterized protein that in homo sapiens is encoded by the C11orf52 gene.

== Gene ==
=== Location ===
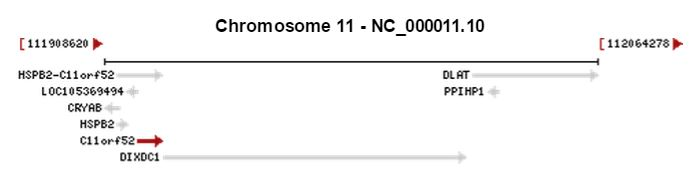
Location of C11orf52 on chromosome 11

C11orf52 is located on chromosome 11 at 11q23.1, starting at 111908620 and ending at 112064278. C11orf52 spans 155658 base pairs and is orientated on the positive strand. Gene C11orf52 has a molecular weight of 14kDa and is a protein coding gene of 7,995 bp containing four exons. The coding region is made up of 1,168 bp.

=== Gene neighborhood ===
Genes HSPB2, CRYAB, OLAT, and PPIHP1 neighbor C11orf52 on chromosome 11.

=== Expression ===
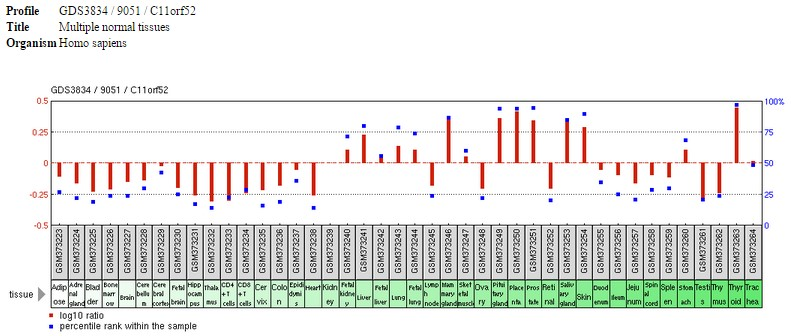
Diagram depicting the expression of KIAA1841 in tissues throughout the body.

C11orf52 is highly expressed in the thyroid, thalamus, pituitary, placenta, and prostate, kidney, heart, and skeletal muscles. However, in estrogen receptor alpha-silenced MCF-7 breast cancer cells, it is expressed at an extremely low level compared to control tissues.

Shows the under-expression of the C11orf52 protein in estrogen receptor alpha-silenced MCF7 breast cancer cells compared to control tissue.

=== Transcript ===
There is only one variant of C11orf52 RNA. The mRNA sequence is 1,140 base pairs long. There is an upstream stop codon located at nucleotides 65 – 67. The 23rd amino acid varies between threonine and arginine.

== Protein ==
The 123 amino acid chain is a domain of unknown function. It has a molecular weight of 13,9 kDal and a predicted Isoelectric Point of 9.74 C11orf52 is predicted to be targeted to the nucleus.

There are no isoforms of the protein encoded by C11orf52.

Amino acid sequence for the protein C11orf52

=== Structure ===
The LYS19-22 region is an external domain of the protein structure.

== Homology ==
=== Orthologs ===
There is only one member of the C11orf52 gene family and no splice isoforms can be found going back to Geospiza fortis - the most distantly related to Homo Sapiens C11orf52 sequence. Gene duplication first occurred approximately 324.5 million years ago in reptiles and birds. There are no paralogs for the C11orf52 gene.

Species	Common name	Accession #	Sequence length	mRNA Identity %	Sequence similarity %
Homo sapiens	Human	NP_542390.2	123	100	100
Saimiri boliviensis boliviensis	Black-Capped Squirrel Monkey	XP_010332875.1	126	87	89
Equus caballus	Horse	XP_001916914.1	124	82	82
Oryctolagus cuniculus	European Rabbit	XP_002708495.1	126	75	83
Erinaceus europaeus	European Hedgehog	XP_007539796.1	124	59	69
Leptonychotes weddellii	Weddell Seal	XP_006733365.1	130	48	59
Pelodiscus sinensis	Chinese Softshell Turtle	XP_006111270.1	123	44	59
Anolis carolinensis	Carolina Anole	XP_008119278.1	125	42	57
Alligator mississippiensis	American Alligator	XP_006271409.1	118	39	54
Python bivittatus	Burmese Python	XP_007422684.1	160	38	59
Haliaeetus albicilla	White-Tailed Eagle	XP_009915555.1	118	46	60
Pseudopodoces humilis	Ground Tit	XP_005531117.1	118	46	58
Cariama cristata	Red-legged Seriema	XP_009702852.1	118	44	58
Apaloderma vittatum	Bar-tailed Trogon	XP_009868605.1	118	44	59
Anas platyrhynchos	Mallard	XP_005030930.1	139	43	58
Tinamus guttatus	White-throated tinamou	XP_010217725.1	118	42	57
Ficedula albicollis	Collared Flycatcher	XP_005058859.1	122	38	52
Geospiza fortis	Medium Ground Finch	XP_005427571.1	117	36	52

== Clinical significance ==
Unusual DNA methylation in the C11orf52 gene in some children can be attributed to prenatal smoke exposure.

C11orf52 may also play a role in lung cancer. C11orf52 is expressed in the lungs and has been associated with increased phosphorylation in cell lung cancer tumors. There is evidence that phosphorylation mechanisms exist which enhance proteins and pathways which should have inhibited phosphorylation in order to prevent extreme proliferation. C11orf52 is one gene where the phosphorylation is significantly different between the cancerous cells and normal tissue.
