= Hsp20 =

Protein family

Hsp20/alpha crystallin family

Identifiers
- Symbol: HSP20
- Pfam: PF00011
- InterPro: IPR002068
- PROSITE: PDOC00791
- SCOP2: 1shs / SCOPe / SUPFAM
- CDD: cd06464
Available protein structures:
- PDB: 2byuI:47-137 1gmeA:47-150 1shsF:46-147 IPR002068 PF00011 (ECOD; PDBsum)
- AlphaFold: IPR002068; PF00011

The heat shock protein Hsp20 family, also known as small heat shock proteins (sHSPs), is a family of heat shock proteins.

Prokaryotic and eukaryotic organisms respond to heat shock or other environmental stress by inducing the synthesis of proteins collectively known as heat-shock proteins (hsp). Amongst them is a family of proteins with an average molecular weight of 20 kDa, known as the hsp20 proteins. These seem to act as protein chaperones that can protect other proteins against heat-induced denaturation and aggregation. Hsp20 proteins seem to form large heterooligomeric aggregates. Structurally, this family is characterised by the presence of a conserved C-terminal domain, alpha-crystallin domain, of about 100 residues. Recently, small heat shock proteins (sHSPs) were found in marine viruses (cyanophages).

== Function and regulation ==
Hsp20, like all heat shock proteins, is in abundance when cells are under stressed conditions. Hsp20 is known to be expressed in many human tissues, including the brain and heart. Hsp20 has been studied extensively in cardiac myocytes and is known to act as a chaperon protein, binding to protein kinase 1 (PDK1) and allowing its nuclear transport. In addition, the phosphorylation of hsp20 has been shown to effect the structure of cells cytoskeletons. Due to hsp20 commonly forming dimers with itself when heated, its function of chaperoning can be greatly affected.

== Human small heat shock proteins ==
- HSPB1
- HSPB2
- HSPB3
- HSPB4 (CRYAA)
- HSPB5 (CRYAB)
- HSPB6
- HSPB7
- HSPB8
- HSPB9
- HSPB10
