= BFSP1 =

Protein-coding gene in humans

Identifiers
- Aliases: BFSP1, CP115, CP94, CTRCT33, LIFL-H, beaded filament structural protein 1
- External IDs: OMIM: 603307; MGI: 101770; GeneCards: BFSP1

Gene location (Human)
Chr.	Chromosome 20 (human)
Band	20p12.1	Start	17,493,905 bp
Band	20p12.1	End	17,569,220 bp

Gene location (Mouse)
Chr.	Chromosome 2 (mouse)
Band	2|2 G1	Start	143,668,448 bp
Band	2|2 G1	End	143,705,093 bp
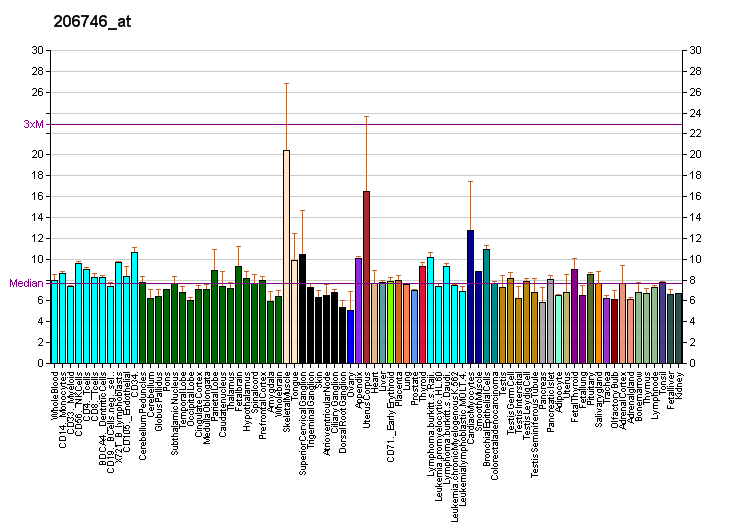
RNA expression pattern
Bgee	Human / Mouse (ortholog); Top expressed in: tendon of biceps brachii; gonad; testicle; granulocyte; C1 segment; stromal cell of endometrium; prefrontal cortex; popliteal artery; tibial arteries; Descending thoracic aorta / Top expressed in: lens; morula; epithelium of lens; corneal stroma; retinal pigment epithelium; conjunctival fornix; iris; ciliary body; seminiferous tubule; jejunum; More reference expression data
BioGPS	More reference expression data
Gene ontology
Molecular function	structural constituent of cytoskeleton; protein binding; structural constituent of eye lens
Cellular component	cell cortex; intermediate filament; cytoskeleton; membrane; cytoplasm; plasma membrane
Biological process	cytoskeleton organization; cell maturation; lens fiber cell development; biological process
Sources:Amigo / QuickGO
Orthologs
Databases	NCBI: entry; OMA: entry
Species	Human	Mouse
Entrez	631	12075
Ensembl	ENSG00000125864	ENSMUSG00000027420
UniProt	Q12934	A2AMT1
RefSeq (mRNA)	NM_001161705; NM_001195; NM_001278606; NM_001278607; NM_001278608	NM_001291061; NM_009751
RefSeq (protein)	NP_001155177; NP_001186; NP_001265535; NP_001265536; NP_001265537	NP_001277990; NP_033881
Location (UCSC)	Chr 20: 17.49 – 17.57 Mb	Chr 2: 143.67 – 143.71 Mb
PubMed search
- Wikidata
View/Edit Human	View/Edit Mouse

BFSP1 is a gene that encodes the protein filensin ("beaded filament structural protein 1") in humans.

More than 99% of the vertebrate ocular lens is made up of terminally differentiated lens fiber cells. Two lens-specific intermediate filament proteins, phakinin (also known as CP49) and the protein product of this gene, filensin (or CP115), are expressed only after fiber cell differentiation has begun. Both proteins are found in a structurally unique cytoskeletal element that is referred to as the beaded filament (BF).

The two BFSP proteins are put into a "type VI" of intermediate filament (IF) classification. Unlike other IFs that form unbranched links, the two proteins form a network of filaments together with CRYAA.
