= ADP-ribosylhydrolase =

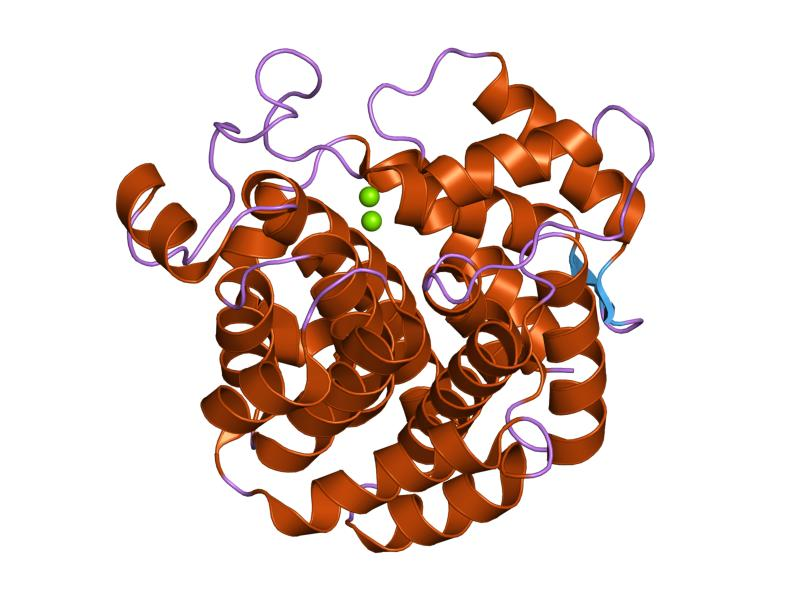
- crystal structure of ribosylglycohydrolase mj1187 from methanococcus jannaschii

Identifiers
- Symbol: ARH
- Pfam: PF03747
- InterPro: IPR005502
- SCOP2: 1t5j / SCOPe / SUPFAM
Available protein structures:
- PDB: IPR005502 PF03747 (ECOD; PDBsum)
- AlphaFold: IPR005502; PF03747

In molecular biology, the (ADP-ribosyl)hydrolase (ARH) family contains enzymes which catalyses the hydrolysis of ADP-ribosyl modifications from proteins, nucleic acids and small molecules.

== Types ==
This family has three members in humans (ARH1-3): ARH1, also termed [Protein ADP-ribosylarginine] hydrolase, cleaves ADP-ribose-L-arginine, ARH2, which is predicted to be enzymatically inactive, and ARH3, which cleaves primarily ADP-ribose-L-serine, but was shown to also hydrolyse poly(ADP-ribose), 1''-O-acetyl-ADP-ribose and alpha-nicotinamide adenine dinucleotide. The family also includes ADP-ribosyl-(dinitrogen reductase) hydrolase (DraG) known to regulate dinitrogenase reductase, a key enzyme of the nitrogen fixating pathway in bacteria, and most surprisingly jellyfish crystallins, although the latter proteins appear to have lost the presumed active site residues.

| Class | Species | | | Intracellular location | Activity | Function |
| Class | Bacteria | Human | Others | Intracellular location | Activity | Function |
|---|---|---|---|---|---|---|
| I | | ARH1 | | endoplasmic reticulum, cytoplasm | ADP-ribosylarginine hydrolase | inflammation, genomic stability |
| II | | ARH2 | | cytoplasm, cardiac sarcomeres | inactive | heart chamber outgrowth |
| III | | ARH3 | | Nucleus, cytoplasm | ADP-ribosylserine hydrolase | DNA repair |
| IV | | | Crystallin J1 and SelJ | | inactive | Crystallin |
| V | DraG | | | | ADP-ribosylarginine hydrolase | Regulation of nitrogen fixation |

== See also ==
- ADP-ribosylhydrolase 1
- ADP-ribosyl-(dinitrogen reductase) hydrolase
