= HSP12 =

Yeast protein

HSP12
| Names/Aliases | HSP12, GLP1, HOR5 |
| Systematic Name | YFL014W |
| Species | S. cerevisiae |
| Classification | Small heat shock protein (sHSP) |
| Gene Location | Chromosome VI |
| Length (A.A.) | 109 |
| Molecular Weight (Da) | 11688.8 |
| Reference | |

HSP12, or Heat Shock Protein 12, is a small stress response protein synthesized by yeast in multiple disfavorable conditions. HSP12 originates from budding yeast (Saccharomyces cerevisiae) and is one of its two small heat shock proteins (sHSPs), which are short chaperone proteins synthesized by cells primarily in response to heat shock, but often inducible by other stressors. HSP12 plays a role in protecting cells from damage by stabilizing proteins and membranes, assisting in protein folding, and preventing protein aggregation. It appears to have a role in the biofilm formation of certain wines, although this mechanism is not fully understood.

HSP12 is made of a single polypeptide with 4 α-helical subregions and has an amphipathic nature which leads to it commonly being found bound to micelles. It has a size of 12 kDa, similar to other sHSPs. HSP12 is produced in the early stationary phase induced by oxidative, osmotic, temperature, sugar, or ethanol stressors, as the cell shifts focus to homeostasis and survival rather than growth. This protein has also been linked to the formation of biofilms which aids yeast in surviving freezing and high alcohol.

== Genetic regulation ==
HSP12 is widely used in the research of genetic regulation and promoter sequence binding. One reason for this popularity is the high levels of expression when induced, as well as tightly controllable genetic regulation. Its promoter region contains 7 known transcription binding elements:two heat shock elements (HSEs) and general stress response elements (STREs). The HSEs bind to Hsf1 (heat shock factor 1), while STREs bind to a wider range of transcription factors such as Abf1 and Rap. The promoter region also contains TATA box motifs, which are common in tightly regulated genes.

HSP12 is regulated by the HOG1 (high osmolarity glycerol-1) and PBS2 pathways. The HOG1 pathway is a signal transduction pathway found in yeast cells that responds to stressors such as heat shock, osmotic stress, salt stress, pH stress, and some others . When the yeast is exposed to these stressors [TM2] membrane sensors detect the change and activate the Hog1 protein. Activated Hog1 then triggers a series of events leading to changes in gene expression, ultimately helping the cell adapt to osmotic stress by inducing the synthesis of protective molecules such as glycerol. PBS2 also responds to the same stressors. When activated, the pathway culminates in the phosphorylation and activation of the transcription factor, allowing for the expression of stress-response genes to help the cell adapt and survive adverse conditions. Both HOG1 and PBS2 enhance the promoter region CCCT motif. Additionally, when cells are modified to over-express HOG1 and PBS2 genes, there is an increase in HSP12 production.. HSP12 mainly acts as a molecular chaperone where it binds to unfolded or mis-folded proteins, preventing their aggregation and aiding in correct folding. This chaperone activity stabilizes proteins, ensuring their proper function even under stress. By preventing protein aggregation and assisting in folding, HSP12 protects cells from stress-induced damage, promoting cell survival

== Cellular mechanism ==
When exposed to a triggering factor within the cell, HSP12 undergoes a conformational change. When put in a detergent solution, there is a conformational change from a general disordered structure of DPC micelles, where there is a single α-helix, whereas in the presence of SDS micelles there are 4 α-helixes. On a transcriptional level, HSP12 is primarily regulated by the HOG1 and PBS2 pathways

== Medical applications ==
sHSP's are widely distributed across the animal kingdom and they all share motifs that impact their structure and function. In mammals they prevent cataracts and ischemic and reperfusion injury that can be caused by heart attack and stroke. In humans there are ten known varieties. Understanding HSP12 in yeast will allow for possible therapeutic and medical advancements. Targeting sHSPs could lead to the development of novel therapeutics for diseases that are associated with protein mis-folding, aggregation, and cellular damage. Besides cataracts and reperfusion injury future, sHSP therapies could also treat cancer and neurodegenerative diseases.
