= CRYGA =

Protein-coding gene in humans

Identifiers
- Aliases: CRYGA, CRY-g-A, CRYG1, CRYG5, crystallin gamma A
- External IDs: OMIM: 123660; MGI: 88521; GeneCards: CRYGA
Available structures
PDB	Ortholog search: PDBe RCSB
PDB	List of PDB id codes 1LER

Gene location (Human)
Chr.	Chromosome 2 (human)
Band	2q33.3	Start	208,160,740 bp
Band	2q33.3	End	208,163,589 bp

Gene location (Mouse)
Chr.	Chromosome 1 (mouse)
Band	1 C2|1 32.84 cM	Start	65,139,548 bp
Band	1 C2|1 32.84 cM	End	65,142,532 bp
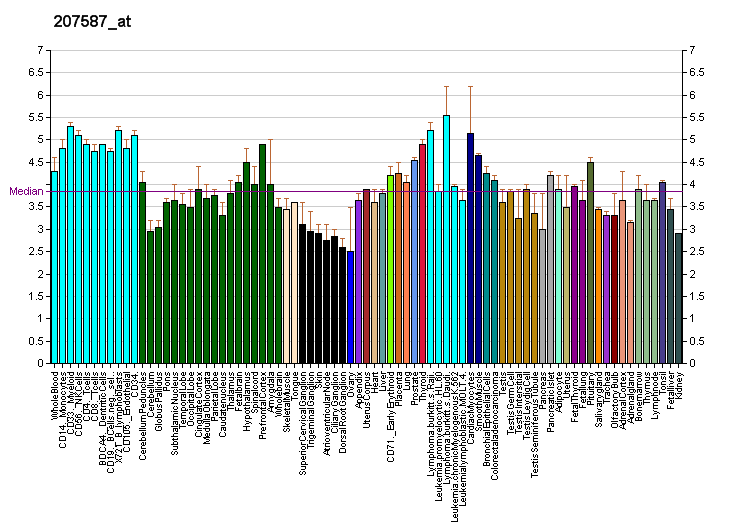
RNA expression pattern
Bgee	Human / Mouse (ortholog); Top expressed in: testicle; Brodmann area 9; prefrontal cortex; nucleus accumbens; anterior cingulate cortex; right frontal lobe; primary visual cortex; putamen; superior frontal gyrus; amygdala / Top expressed in: lens; blastocyst; embryo; right kidney; human kidney; striatum of neuraxis; hypothalamus; hippocampus proper; primary visual cortex; dentate gyrus of hippocampal formation granule cell; More reference expression data
BioGPS	More reference expression data
Gene ontology
Molecular function	structural constituent of eye lens
Cellular component	cellular component
Biological process	eye development; visual perception; lens development in camera-type eye
Sources:Amigo / QuickGO
Orthologs
Databases	NCBI: entry; OMA: entry
Species	Human	Mouse
Entrez	1418	12964
Ensembl	ENSG00000168582	ENSMUSG00000044429
UniProt	P11844	P04345
RefSeq (mRNA)	NM_014617	NM_007774
RefSeq (protein)	NP_055432	NP_031800
Location (UCSC)	Chr 2: 208.16 – 208.16 Mb	Chr 1: 65.14 – 65.14 Mb
PubMed search
- Wikidata
View/Edit Human	View/Edit Mouse

Gamma-crystallin A is a protein that in humans is encoded by the CRYGA gene.

Crystallins are separated into two classes: taxon-specific, or enzyme, and ubiquitous. The latter class constitutes the major proteins of vertebrate eye lens and maintains the transparency and refractive index of the lens. Since lens central fiber cells lose their nuclei during development, these crystallins are made and then retained throughout life, making them extremely stable proteins. Mammalian lens crystallins are divided into alpha, beta, and gamma families; beta and gamma crystallins are also considered as a superfamily. Alpha and beta families are further divided into acidic and basic groups. Seven protein regions exist in crystallins: four homologous motifs, a connecting peptide, and N- and C-terminal extensions. Gamma-crystallins are a homogeneous group of highly symmetrical, monomeric proteins typically lacking connecting peptides and terminal extensions. They are differentially regulated after early development. Four gamma-crystallin genes (gamma-A through gamma-D) and three pseudogenes (gamma-E, gamma-F, gamma-G) are tandemly organized in a genomic segment as a gene cluster. Whether due to aging or mutations in specific genes, gamma-crystallins have been involved in cataract formation.
