= Crystallin, gamma D =

Protein found in humans

CRYGD
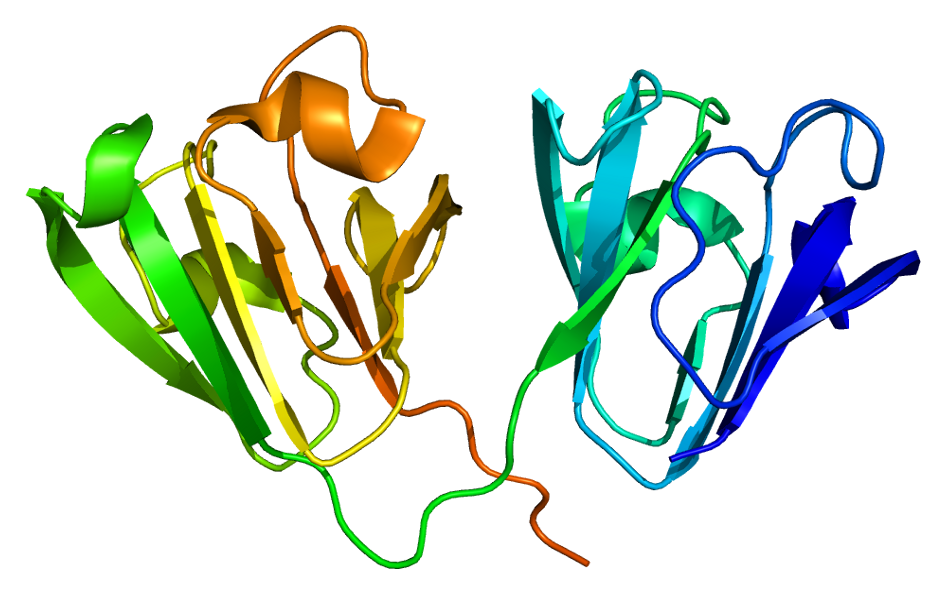

Identifiers
- Aliases: CRYGD, CACA, CCA3, CCP, CRYG4, CTRCT4, PCC, cry-g-D, crystallin gamma D
- External IDs: OMIM: 123690; MGI: 88524; GeneCards: CRYGD
Available structures
PDB	Ortholog search: PDBe RCSB
PDB	List of PDB id codes 1H4A, 1HK0, 2G98, 2KFB, 2KLJ, 4GR7, 4JGF

Gene location (Human)
Chr.	Chromosome 2 (human)
Band	2q33.3	Start	208,121,607 bp
Band	2q33.3	End	208,124,524 bp

Gene location (Mouse)
Chr.	Chromosome 1 (mouse)
Band	1 C2|1 32.8 cM	Start	65,101,031 bp
Band	1 C2|1 32.8 cM	End	65,102,611 bp
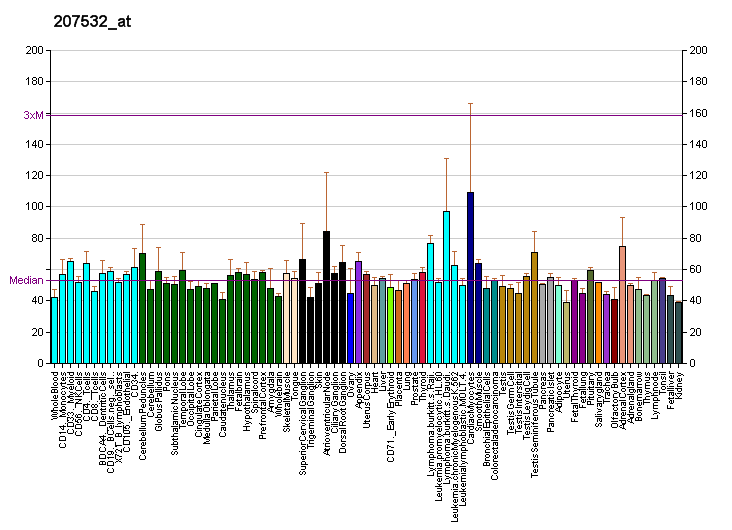
RNA expression pattern
Bgee	Human / Mouse (ortholog); Top expressed in: testicle; gonad; ventricular zone; ganglionic eminence; lens; left ovary; hypothalamus; substantia nigra; prefrontal cortex; temporal lobe / Top expressed in: epithelium of lens; conjunctival fornix; retinal pigment epithelium; occiput; ciliary body; occipital bone; iris; Meckel's cartilage; rib; sphenoid bone; More reference expression data
BioGPS	More reference expression data
Gene ontology
Molecular function	protein binding; structural constituent of eye lens
Cellular component	nucleus; cytoplasm
Biological process	cellular response to reactive oxygen species; response to stimulus; visual perception; lens development in camera-type eye; lens fiber cell differentiation
Sources:Amigo / QuickGO
Orthologs
Databases	NCBI: entry; OMA: entry
Species	Human	Mouse
Entrez	1421	12967
Ensembl	ENSG00000118231; ENSG00000285434	ENSMUSG00000067299
UniProt	P07320	P04342
RefSeq (mRNA)	NM_006891	NM_007776
RefSeq (protein)	NP_008822	NP_031802
Location (UCSC)	Chr 2: 208.12 – 208.12 Mb	Chr 1: 65.1 – 65.1 Mb
PubMed search
- Wikidata
View/Edit Human	View/Edit Mouse

Gamma-crystallin D is a protein that in humans is encoded by the CRYGD gene.

Crystallins are separated into two classes: taxon-specific, or enzyme, and ubiquitous. The latter class constitutes the major proteins of vertebrate eye lens and maintains the transparency and refractive index of the lens. Since lens central fiber cells lose their nuclei during development, these crystallins are made and then retained throughout life, making them extremely stable proteins. Mammalian lens crystallins are divided into alpha, beta, and gamma families; beta and gamma crystallins are also considered as a superfamily. Alpha and beta families are further divided into acidic and basic groups. Seven protein regions exist in crystallins: four homologous motifs, a connecting peptide, and N- and C-terminal extensions. Gamma-crystallins are a homogeneous group of highly symmetrical, monomeric proteins typically lacking connecting peptides and terminal extensions. They are differentially regulated after early development. Four gamma-crystallin genes (gamma-A through gamma-D) and three pseudogenes (gamma-E, gamma-F, gamma-G) are tandemly organized in a genomic segment as a gene cluster. Whether due to aging or mutations in specific genes, gamma-crystallins have been involved in cataract formation.
