= CRYGS =

Protein-coding gene in the species Homo sapiens

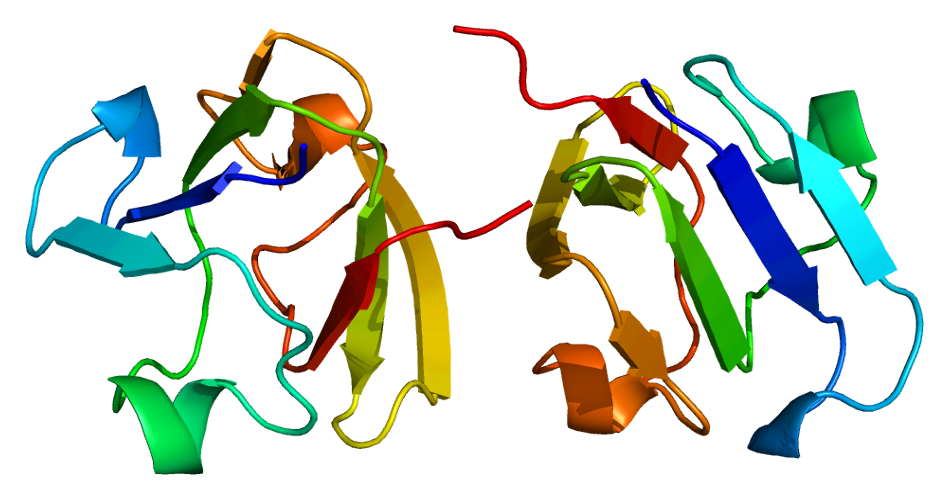

Identifiers
- Aliases: CRYGS, CRYG8, CTRCT20, crystallin gamma S
- External IDs: OMIM: 123730; MGI: 1298216; GeneCards: CRYGS
Available structures
| PDB | Ortholog search: PDBe RCSB |
| PDB | List of PDB id codes 1HA4, 2M3T, 2M3U |

Gene location (Human)
| Chr. | Chromosome 3 (human) |
| Band | 3q27.3 | Start | 186,538,441 bp |
| Band | 3q27.3 | End | 186,546,702 bp |

Gene location (Mouse)
| Chr. | Chromosome 16 (mouse) |
| Band | 16 B1|16 13.66 cM | Start | 22,623,953 bp |
| Band | 16 B1|16 13.66 cM | End | 22,630,327 bp |
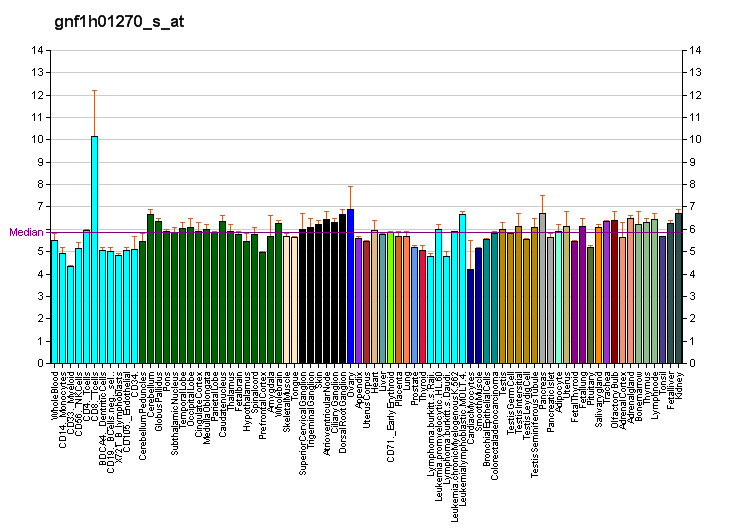
RNA expression pattern
| Bgee | Human / Mouse (ortholog); Top expressed in: anterior segment of eyeball; lens; cerebellar hemisphere; right hemisphere of cerebellum; granulocyte; gonad; testicle; right lobe of liver; mucosa of transverse colon; apex of heart / Top expressed in: epithelium of lens; corneal stroma; ciliary body; retinal pigment epithelium; conjunctival fornix; iris; neural layer of retina; morula; embryo; embryo; More reference expression data |
| BioGPS | More reference expression data |
Orthologs
| Databases | NCBI: entry; OMA: entry |
| Species | Human | Mouse |
| Entrez | 1427 | 12970 |
| Ensembl | ENSG00000213139 | ENSMUSG00000033501 |
| UniProt | P22914 | O35486 |
| RefSeq (mRNA) | NM_017541 | NM_009967 |
| RefSeq (protein) | NP_060011 | NP_034097 |
| Location (UCSC) | Chr 3: 186.54 – 186.55 Mb | Chr 16: 22.62 – 22.63 Mb |
| PubMed search |
- Wikidata
| View/Edit Human | View/Edit Mouse |

Gamma-crystallin S is a protein that in humans is encoded by the CRYGS gene.

Crystallins are separated into two classes: taxon-specific, or enzyme, and ubiquitous. The latter class constitutes the major proteins of vertebrate eye lens and maintains the transparency and refractive index of the lens. Since lens central fiber cells lose their nuclei during development, these crystallins are made and then retained throughout life, making them extremely stable proteins.

Mammalian lens crystallins are divided into alpha, beta, and gamma families; beta and gamma crystallins are also considered as a superfamily. Alpha and beta families are further divided into acidic and basic groups. Seven protein regions exist in crystallins: four homologous motifs, a connecting peptide, and N- and C-terminal extensions. Gamma-crystallins are a homogeneous group of highly symmetrical, monomeric proteins typically lacking connecting peptides and terminal extensions. They are differentially regulated after early development. This gene encodes a protein initially considered to be a beta-crystallin but the encoded protein is monomeric and has greater sequence similarity to other gamma-crystallins. This gene encodes the most significant gamma-crystallin in adult eye lens tissue.

Whether due to aging or mutations in specific genes, gamma-crystallins have been involved in cataract formation.
