= BFSP2 =

Protein-coding gene in humans

Identifiers
- Aliases: BFSP2, CP47, CP49, CTRCT12, LIFL-L, PHAKOSIN, beaded filament structural protein 2
- External IDs: OMIM: 603212; MGI: 1333828; GeneCards: BFSP2

Gene location (Human)
Chr.	Chromosome 3 (human)
Band	3q22.1	Start	133,400,056 bp
Band	3q22.1	End	133,475,222 bp

Gene location (Mouse)
Chr.	Chromosome 9 (mouse)
Band	9|9 F1	Start	103,302,123 bp
Band	9|9 F1	End	103,357,619 bp
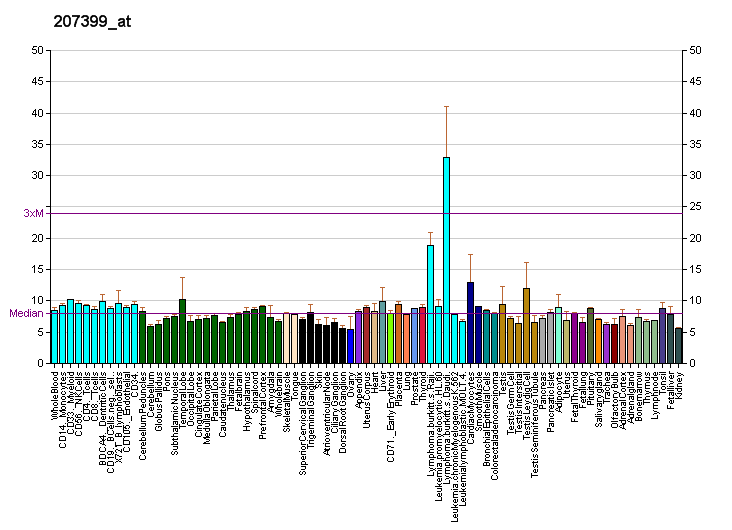
RNA expression pattern
Bgee	Human / Mouse (ortholog); Top expressed in: lens; testicle; gonad; lymph node; spleen; granulocyte; appendix; mucosa of transverse colon; bone marrow cell; rectum / Top expressed in: lens; epithelium of lens; iris; ciliary body; retinal pigment epithelium; Jacobson's organ; sciatic nerve; embryo; embryo; facial motor nucleus; More reference expression data
BioGPS	More reference expression data
Gene ontology
Molecular function	structural constituent of cytoskeleton; protein binding; structural molecule activity; structural constituent of eye lens
Cellular component	cell cortex; intermediate filament; cytoskeleton; membrane; cytoplasm; plasma membrane
Biological process	cell maturation; cytoskeleton organization; lens fiber cell development; response to stimulus; visual perception; intermediate filament cytoskeleton organization
Sources:Amigo / QuickGO
Orthologs
Databases	NCBI: entry; OMA: entry
Species	Human	Mouse
Entrez	8419	107993
Ensembl	ENSG00000170819	ENSMUSG00000032556
UniProt	Q13515	Q6NVD9
RefSeq (mRNA)	NM_003571	NM_001002896; NM_001364514
RefSeq (protein)	NP_003562	NP_001002896; NP_001351443
Location (UCSC)	Chr 3: 133.4 – 133.48 Mb	Chr 9: 103.3 – 103.36 Mb
PubMed search
- Wikidata
View/Edit Human	View/Edit Mouse

BFSP2 is a gene that encodes the protein phakinin ("beaded filament structural protein 2") in humans.

More than 99% of the vertebrate ocular lens consists of terminally differentiated lens fiber cells. Two lens-specific intermediate filament proteins, the protein product of this gene (CP49 or phakinin) and filensin (also known as CP115), are expressed only after fiber cell differentiation has begun. Both proteins are found in a structurally unique cytoskeletal element that is referred to as the beaded filament (BF). Mutations in this gene have been associated with juvenile-onset, progressive cataracts and Dowling-Meara epidermolysis bullosa simplex.

The two BFSP proteins are put into a "type VI" of intermediate filament (IF) classification. Unlike other IFs that form unbranched links, the two proteins form a network of filaments together with CRYAA.
