= HSPB6 =

Protein-coding gene in the species Homo sapiens

Identifiers
- Aliases: HSPB6, HEL55, Hsp20, PPP1R91, heat shock protein family B (small) member 6
- External IDs: OMIM: 610695; MGI: 2685325; GeneCards: HSPB6
Available structures
PDB	Ortholog search: PDBe RCSB
PDB	List of PDB id codes 4JUS, 4JUT

Gene location (Human)
Chr.	Chromosome 19 (human)
Band	19q13.12	Start	35,754,566 bp
Band	19q13.12	End	35,758,079 bp

Gene location (Mouse)
Chr.	Chromosome 7 (mouse)
Band	7|7 B1	Start	30,251,603 bp
Band	7|7 B1	End	30,254,868 bp
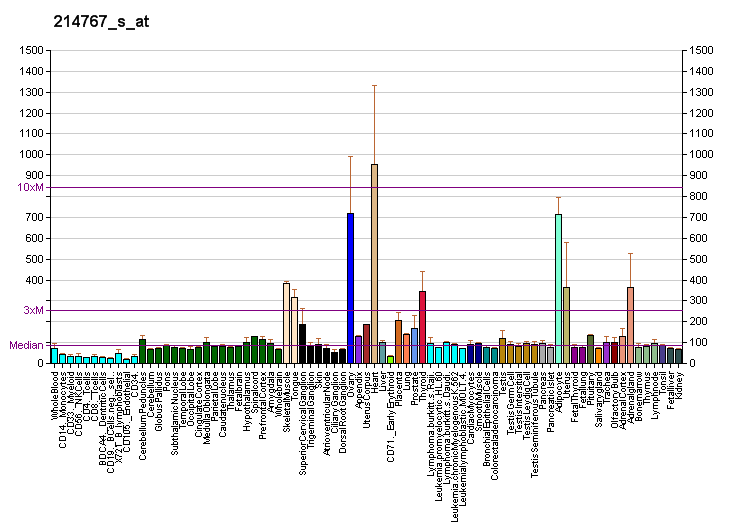
RNA expression pattern
Bgee	Human / Mouse (ortholog); Top expressed in: muscle of thigh; apex of heart; gastrocnemius muscle; decidua; right coronary artery; left coronary artery; left uterine tube; canal of the cervix; popliteal artery; tibial arteries / Top expressed in: interventricular septum; extraocular muscle; temporal muscle; ankle; soleus muscle; vastus lateralis muscle; sternocleidomastoid muscle; muscle of thigh; triceps brachii muscle; digastric muscle; More reference expression data
BioGPS	More reference expression data
Gene ontology
Molecular function	structural constituent of eye lens; protein homodimerization activity; protein binding; unfolded protein binding; chaperone binding
Cellular component	nucleus; cytoplasm; extracellular region
Biological process	regulation of muscle contraction; negative regulation of cardiac muscle cell apoptotic process; positive regulation of angiogenesis; chaperone-mediated protein folding
Sources:Amigo / QuickGO
Orthologs
Databases	NCBI: entry; OMA: entry
Species	Human	Mouse
Entrez	126393	243912
Ensembl	ENSG00000004776	ENSMUSG00000036854
UniProt	O14558	Q5EBG6
RefSeq (mRNA)	NM_144617	NM_001012401; NM_001364179
RefSeq (protein)	NP_653218	NP_001012401; NP_001351108
Location (UCSC)	Chr 19: 35.75 – 35.76 Mb	Chr 7: 30.25 – 30.25 Mb
PubMed search
- Wikidata
View/Edit Human	View/Edit Mouse

Heat shock protein beta-6 (HSPB6) is a protein that in humans is encoded by the HSPB6 gene.

HSPB6 is a 17-kDa member of the heat shock family of proteins. HSPB6 was first identified in 1994 when it was isolated from rat and human skeletal muscle as a complex with HSPB1 (also known as HSP27) and HSPB5 (also known as αB-crystallin).

HSPB6 is expressed in multiple tissues; however, HSPB6 is most highly and constitutively expressed in vascular, airway, colonic, bladder, uterine smooth muscle, cardiac muscle and skeletal muscle. HSPB6 has specific functions for vasodilation, platelet function, and insulin resistance and in smooth and cardiac muscle.
