= ADP-ribosylhydrolase 3 =

Protein found in humans

ADPRS
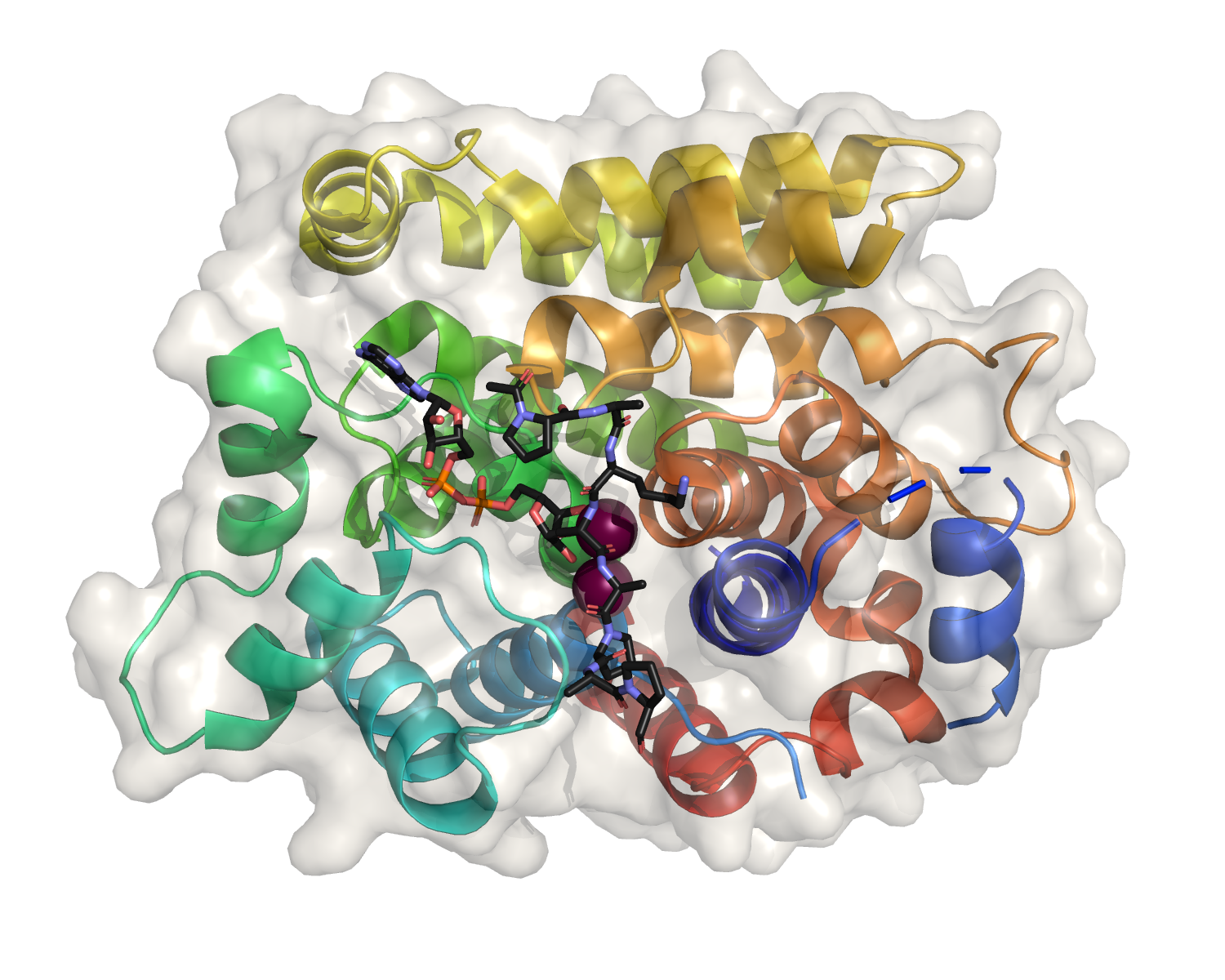

Identifiers
- Aliases: ADPRS, ARH3, ADP-ribosylhydrolase like 2, CONDSIAS, ADP-ribosylserine hydrolase, ADPRHL2
- External IDs: OMIM: 610624; MGI: 2140364; GeneCards: ADPRS
Available structures
PDB	Ortholog search: PDBe RCSB
PDB	List of PDB id codes 2FOZ, 2FP0, 2G4K
Enzyme activity
EC #	BRENDA	ExPASy	KEGG	MetaCyc
3.2.1.143	↗	↗	↗	↗

Gene location (Human)
Chr.	Chromosome 1 (human)
Band	1p34.3	Start	36,088,892 bp
Band	1p34.3	End	36,093,932 bp

Gene location (Mouse)
Chr.	Chromosome 4 (mouse)
Band	4|4 D2.2	Start	126,209,840 bp
Band	4|4 D2.2	End	126,215,496 bp
RNA expression pattern
Bgee	Human / Mouse (ortholog); Top expressed in: right uterine tube; endothelial cell; gingival epithelium; middle temporal gyrus; bronchial epithelial cell; sperm; Brodmann area 23; nasal epithelium; pancreatic epithelial cell; pancreatic ductal cell / Top expressed in: lip; right kidney; yolk sac; neural tube; embryo; embryo; proximal tubule; ventricular zone; epiblast; neural layer of retina; More reference expression data
BioGPS	n/a
Gene ontology
Molecular function	hydrolase activity; metal ion binding; poly(ADP-ribose) glycohydrolase activity
Cellular component	cytoplasm; mitochondrion; nucleus; nucleoplasm; nuclear body; mitochondrial matrix
Biological process	cellular response to superoxide
Sources:Amigo / QuickGO
Orthologs
Databases	NCBI: entry; OMA: entry
Species	Human	Mouse
Entrez	54936	100206
Ensembl	ENSG00000116863	ENSMUSG00000042558
UniProt	Q9NX46	Q8CG72
RefSeq (mRNA)	NM_017825	NM_133883
RefSeq (protein)	NP_060295	NP_598644
Location (UCSC)	Chr 1: 36.09 – 36.09 Mb	Chr 4: 126.21 – 126.22 Mb
PubMed search
- Wikidata
View/Edit Human	View/Edit Mouse

(ADP-ribosyl)hydrolase 3 (ARH3) is an enzyme that in humans is encoded by the ADPRHL2 gene (also called ADPRS). This enzyme reverses the proteins' post-translational addition of ADP-ribose to serine residues as part of the DNA damage response The enzyme is also known to cleave poly(ADP-ribose) polymers, 1''-O-acetyl-ADP-ribose and alpha-NAD^{+}

== Role in disease ==
Loss-of-function mutations in the ADPRHL2 gene result in a recently defined disorder called stress-induced childhood-onset neurodegeneration with variable ataxia and seizures (CONDSIAS; OMIM: 618170). The CONDSIAS is an autosomal recessive disorder which its pertinent gene (ADPRHL2) is mapped on chromosome 1p35.3-p34.1. The phenotypes of this disorder have been reported as neurodegeneration, variable ataxia and seizures, tremor, nystagmus, balance problems, cerebellar, spinal cord and cerebral atrophy, hearing impairment and occasionally hearing loss, ptosis, ophthalmoplegia, dysarthria, muscle weakness, axonal neuropathy, dysmetria, and tongue fasciculation. Symptoms and severity of the disorder appear to be different in patients and sometimes lead to early childhood death. In other words, although older patients present most of the above-mentioned symptoms, younger patients experience loss of developmental milestones and death in their early infancy.

== See also ==
- ADP-ribosylhydrolase
