= Hsp27 =

Protein-coding gene in the species Homo sapiens

HSPB1
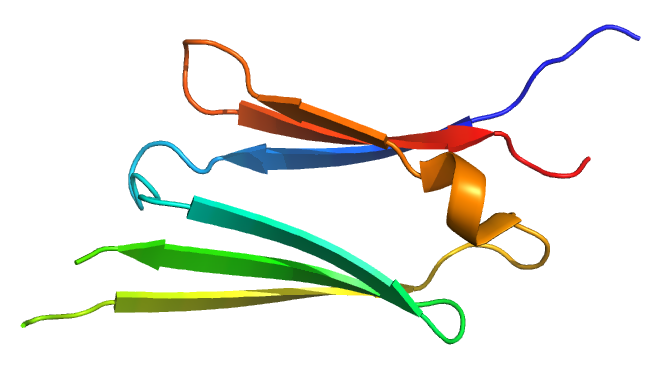

Identifiers
- Aliases: HSPB1, CMT2F, HEL-S-102, HMN2B, HS.76067, HSP27, HSP28, Hsp25, SRP27, heat shock protein family B (small) member 1
- External IDs: OMIM: 602195; MGI: 96240; GeneCards: HSPB1
Available structures
PDB	Ortholog search: PDBe RCSB
PDB	List of PDB id codes 4MJH, 3Q9P, 3Q9Q, 2N3J

Gene location (Human)
Chr.	Chromosome 7 (human)
Band	7q11.23	Start	76,302,673 bp
Band	7q11.23	End	76,304,295 bp

Gene location (Mouse)
Chr.	Chromosome 5 (mouse)
Band	5 G2|5 75.51 cM	Start	135,916,773 bp
Band	5 G2|5 75.51 cM	End	135,918,417 bp
RNA expression pattern
Bgee	Human / Mouse (ortholog); Top expressed in: ascending aorta; right coronary artery; mucosa of pharynx; gums; Descending thoracic aorta; Skeletal muscle tissue of rectus abdominis; gingival epithelium; popliteal artery; tibial arteries; left coronary artery / Top expressed in: esophagus; lip; zone of skin; muscle of thigh; urinary bladder; placenta; heart; quadriceps femoris muscle; muscle tissue; adrenal gland; More reference expression data
BioGPS	n/a
Gene ontology
Molecular function	protein kinase C inhibitor activity; protein kinase binding; protein binding; protein kinase C binding; ubiquitin binding; identical protein binding; protein folding chaperone activity; RNA binding; protein homodimerization activity
Cellular component	nucleus; cytoskeleton; spindle; intracellular anatomical structure; cytosol; extracellular exosome; plasma membrane; Z discdkac; cytoplasm; contractile fiber; focal adhesion; proteasome complex; extracellular matrix; extracellular space; axon cytoplasm
Biological process	regulation of translational initiation; regulation of mRNA stability; cellular response to vascular endothelial growth factor stimulus; negative regulation of protein serine/threonine kinase activity; positive regulation of endothelial cell chemotaxis; positive regulation of angiogenesis; retina homeostasis; platelet aggregation; intracellular signal transduction; negative regulation of apoptotic signaling pathway; regulation of autophagy; negative regulation of oxidative stress-induced intrinsic apoptotic signaling pathway; positive regulation of endothelial cell chemotaxis by VEGF-activated vascular endothelial growth factor receptor signaling pathway; positive regulation of interleukin-1 beta production; vascular endothelial growth factor receptor signaling pathway; positive regulation of blood vessel endothelial cell migration; response to unfolded protein; negative regulation of protein kinase activity; regulation of I-kappaB kinase/NF-kappaB signaling; response to virus; negative regulation of apoptotic process; regulation of protein phosphorylation; chaperone-mediated protein folding; anterograde axonal protein transport
Sources:Amigo / QuickGO
Orthologs
Databases	NCBI: entry; OMA: entry
Species	Human	Mouse
Entrez	3315	15507
Ensembl	ENSG00000106211	ENSMUSG00000004951
UniProt	P04792	P14602
RefSeq (mRNA)	NM_001540	NM_013560
RefSeq (protein)	NP_001531	NP_038588
Location (UCSC)	Chr 7: 76.3 – 76.3 Mb	Chr 5: 135.92 – 135.92 Mb
PubMed search
- Wikidata
View/Edit Human	View/Edit Mouse

Heat shock protein 27 (Hsp27) also known as heat shock protein beta-1 (HSPB1) is a protein that in humans is encoded by the HSPB1 gene.

Hsp27 is a chaperone of the sHsp (small heat shock protein) group among α-crystallin, Hsp20, and others. The common functions of sHsps are chaperone activity, thermotolerance, inhibition of apoptosis, regulation of cell development, and cell differentiation. They also take part in signal transduction.

== Structure ==
sHsps have some structural features in common: Very characteristic is a homologous and highly conserved amino acid sequence, the so-called α-crystallin domain near the C-terminus. These domains consist of 80 to 100 residues with sequence homology between 20% and 60% and fold into β-sheets, which are important for the formation of stable dimers. Hsp27 is rather unique among sHsps in that its α-crystallin domain contains a cysteine residue at its dimer interface, which can become oxidized to form a disulfide bond that covalently links the dimer. The N-terminus consists of a less conserved region, the so-called WD/EPF domain, followed by a short variable sequence with a rather conservative site near the end of this domain. The C-terminal region of sHsps consists of the above mentioned α-crystallin domain, followed by a variable sequence with high motility and flexibility. Despite relatively low levels of global sequence conservation in the C-terminal region, many sHsps contain a locally conserved Ile-Xxx-Ile/Val (IxI/V) motif that plays a role in regulating the assembly of oligomers. It is highly flexible and polar because of its negative charges. Probably it functions as a mediator of solubility for hydrophobic sHsps and it stabilizes the protein and protein/substrate complexes. This was shown by elimination of the C-terminal tail in Hsp27Δ182-205 and in Hsp25Δ18. In the case of Hsp27, the IxI/V motif corresponds to 181-Ile-Pro-Val-183, and this region of the protein plays a critical role, as the mutation of the central Pro residue causes the hereditary motor neuropathy Charcot-Marie-Tooth disease.

== Oligomerization ==
Hsp27 forms large, dynamic oligomers with an average mass near 500 kDa in vitro. The N-terminus of Hsp27, with its WD/EPF-region, is essential for the development of these large oligomers. Hsp27-oligomers consist of stable dimers, which are formed by two α-crystallin-domains of neighboring monomers, which was first shown in crystal structures of the proteins MjHSP16.5 from Methanocaldococcus jannaschii and wheat Hsp16.9. Therefore the first step in the oligomeric process involves dimerization of the α-crystallin domain. In metazoans, dimerization by α-crystallin domains proceeds through the formation of a long β-strand at the interface. The amino acid sequences in this region, however, are predicted to be disordered Indeed, the α-crystallin domain of Hsp27 partially unfolds in its monomeric state and is less stable than the dimer.

The oligomerization of Hsp27 is a dynamic process: There is a balance between stable dimers and oligomers (up to 800 kDa) consisting of 16 to 32 subunits and a high exchange rate of subunits. The oligomerization depends on the physiology of the cells, the phosphorylation status of Hsp27 and the exposure to stress. Stress induces an increase of expression (after hours) and phosphorylation (after several minutes) of Hsp27. Stimulation of the p38 MAP kinase cascade by differentiating agents, mitogens, inflammatory cytokines such as TNFα and IL-1β, hydrogen peroxide and other oxidants, leads to the activation of MAPKAP kinases 2 and 3 which directly phosphorylate mammalian sHsps. The phosphorylation plays an important role for the formation of oligomers in exponentially growing cells in vitro, but the oligomerization in tumor cells growing in vivo or growing at confluence in vitro is dependent on cell-cell contact, but not on the phosphorylation status. Furthermore, it was shown that HSP27 contains an Argpyrimidine modification.

In all probability, the oligomerization status is connected with the chaperone activity: aggregates of large oligomers have high chaperone activity, whereas dimers and monomers have relatively higher chaperone activity.

== Cellular localization ==
Hsp27 appears in many cell types, especially all types of muscle cells. It is located mainly in the cytosol, but also in the perinuclear region, endoplasmatic reticulum, and nucleus. It is overexpressed during different stages of cell differentiation and development. This suggests an essential role for Hsp27 in the differentiation of tissues.

An affinity of high expression levels of different phosphorylated Hsp27 species and muscle/neurodegenerative diseases and various cancers was observed. High expression levels possibly are in inverse relation with cell proliferation, metastasis, and resistance to chemotherapy. High levels of Hsp27 were also found in sera of breast cancer patients; therefore Hsp27 could be a potential diagnostic marker.

== Function ==
The main function of Hsp27 is to provide thermotolerance in vivo, cytoprotection, and support of cell survival under stress conditions. More specialized functions of Hsp27 are manifold and complex. In vitro it acts as an ATP-independent chaperone by inhibiting protein aggregation and by stabilizing partially denatured proteins, which ensures refolding by the Hsp70-complex. Hsp27 is also involved in the apoptotic signalling pathway. Hsp27 interacts with the outer mitochondrial membranes and interferes with the activation of cytochrome c/Apaf-1/dATP complex and therefore inhibits the activation of procaspase-9. The phosphorylated form of Hsp27 inhibits Daxx apoptotic protein and prevents the association of Daxx with Fas and Ask1. Moreover, Hsp27 phosphorylation leads to the activation of TAK1 and TAK1-p38/ERK pro-survival signaling, thus opposing TNF-α-induced apoptosis.

A well documented function of Hsp27 is the interaction with actin and intermediate filaments. It prevents the formation of non-covalent filament/filament interactions of the intermediate filaments and protects actin filaments from fragmentation. It also preserves the focal contacts fixed at the cell membrane.

Another function of Hsp27 is the activation of the proteasome. It speeds up the degradation of irreversibly denatured proteins and junkproteins by binding to ubiquitinated proteins and to the 26S proteasome. Hsp27 enhances the activation of the NF-κB pathway, that controls a lot of processes, such as cell growth and inflammatory and stress responses. The cytoprotective properties of Hsp27 result from its ability to modulate reactive oxygen species and to raise glutathione levels.

Probably Hsp27 – among other chaperones – is involved in the process of cell differentiation. Changes of Hsp27 levels were observed in Ehrlich ascite cells, embryonic stem cells, normal B-cells, B-lymphoma cells, osteoblasts, keratinocytes, neurons etc. The upregulation of Hsp27 correlates with the rate of phosphorylation and with an increase of large oligomers. It is possible that Hsp27 plays a crucial role in the termination of growth.

== Clinical significance ==
=== Motor neuropathies ===
At least 12 disease-causing mutations in this gene have been discovered. Heritable mutations in HSPB1 cause distal hereditary motor neuropathies and the motor neuropathy Charcot-Marie-Tooth disease. There are missense mutations throughout the amino acid sequence of Hsp27, and most disease-causing mutations present with adult-onset symptoms. One of the more severe Hsp27 mutants is the Pro182Leu mutant, which manifests symptomatically in the first few years of life and was additionally demonstrated in a transgenic mouse model. The genetic basis of these diseases is typically autosomal dominant, meaning that only one allele contains a mutation. Since the wild-type HSPB1 gene is also expressed alongside the mutated allele, the diseased cells contain a mixed populations of wild-type and mutant Hsp27, and in vitro experiments have shown that the two proteins can form heter-oligomers.

=== Roles in apoptosis ===
Notably, phosphorylated Hsp27 increases human prostate cancer (PCa) cell invasion, enhances cell proliferation, and suppresses Fas-induced apoptosis in human PCa cells. Unphosphorylated Hsp27 has been shown to act as an actin capping protein, preventing actin reorganization and, consequently, cell adhesion and motility. OGX-427, which targets HSP27 through an antisense mechanism, is currently undergoing testing in clinical trials.

=== Roles in cancer ===
Protein kinase C-mediated HSPB1 phosphorylation protects against ferroptosis, an iron-dependent form of non-apoptotic cell death, by reducing iron-mediated production of lipid reactive oxygen species. These novel data support the development of Hsp-targeting strategies and, specifically, anti-HSP27 agents for the treatment of ferroptosis-mediated cancer.

== Interactions ==
Hsp27 has been shown to interact with:

- ASK1,
- CIMIP6,
- CRYAA,
- CRYAB,
- CRYBB2,
- HNRPD,
- HSPB8,
- MK2,
- TAK1, and
- TGFB1I1.
