= TGFB1I1 =

Protein-coding gene in the species Homo sapiens

Identifiers
- Aliases: TGFB1I1, ARA55, HIC-5, HIC5, TSC-5, transforming growth factor beta 1 induced transcript 1
- External IDs: OMIM: 602353; MGI: 102784; GeneCards: TGFB1I1
Available structures
PDB	Ortholog search: PDBe RCSB
PDB	List of PDB id codes 1KLA, 1KLC, 1KLD, 3KFD, 4KV5

Gene location (Human)
Chr.	Chromosome 16 (human)
Band	16p11.2	Start	31,471,585 bp
Band	16p11.2	End	31,477,960 bp

Gene location (Mouse)
Chr.	Chromosome 7 (mouse)
Band	7|7 F3	Start	127,845,984 bp
Band	7|7 F3	End	127,854,871 bp
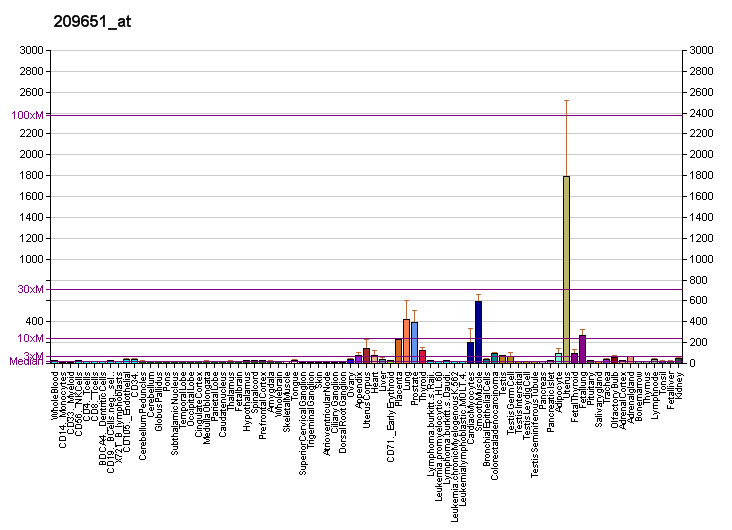
RNA expression pattern
Bgee	Human / Mouse (ortholog); Top expressed in: saphenous vein; body of uterus; myometrium; popliteal artery; tibial arteries; left uterine tube; thoracic aorta; right coronary artery; ascending aorta; tail of epididymis / Top expressed in: ascending aorta; tunica media of zone of aorta; atrium; external carotid artery; internal carotid artery; calvaria; aortic valve; lumbar spinal ganglion; umbilical cord; cervix; More reference expression data
BioGPS	More reference expression data
Gene ontology
Molecular function	I-SMAD binding; transcription coactivator activity; metal ion binding; protein binding; androgen receptor binding; Roundabout binding; transcription coregulator activity
Cellular component	cytoplasm; focal adhesion; nuclear matrix; extracellular matrix; intracellular anatomical structure; cell junction; cytoskeleton; nucleus; collagen-containing extracellular matrix; cytosol; plasma membrane
Biological process	androgen receptor signaling pathway; positive regulation of transforming growth factor beta receptor signaling pathway; cell differentiation; response to heat; negative regulation of transforming growth factor beta receptor signaling pathway; Wnt signaling pathway; transcription by RNA polymerase II; positive regulation of epithelial to mesenchymal transition; ubiquitin-dependent SMAD protein catabolic process; positive regulation of transcription, DNA-templated; cell adhesion; negative regulation of cell population proliferation; morphogenesis of embryonic epithelium; epithelial cell differentiation; cell fate commitment; negative regulation of fat cell differentiation
Sources:Amigo / QuickGO
Orthologs
Databases	NCBI: entry; OMA: entry
Species	Human	Mouse
Entrez	7041	21804
Ensembl	ENSG00000140682	ENSMUSG00000030782
UniProt	O43294	Q62219
RefSeq (mRNA)	NM_015927; NM_001042454; NM_001164719	NM_001289550; NM_001289551; NM_001289552; NM_001289553; NM_009365
RefSeq (protein)	NP_001035919; NP_001158191; NP_057011; NP_001158191.1; NP_057011.2	NP_001276479; NP_001276480; NP_001276481; NP_001276482
Location (UCSC)	Chr 16: 31.47 – 31.48 Mb	Chr 7: 127.85 – 127.85 Mb
PubMed search
- Wikidata
View/Edit Human	View/Edit Mouse

Transforming growth factor beta-1-induced transcript 1 protein is a protein that in humans is encoded by the TGFB1I1 gene. TGFB1I1 is also sometimes called HIC-5 (Hydrogen Peroxide-Inducible Clone-5) or ARA55 (Androgen Receptor Coactivator 55kDA).

As its multiple names suggests, TGFB1I1 a protein whose expression is induced by TGFB1 and is both inducible by hydrogen peroxide, and a coactivator of the androgen receptors.

TGFB1I1 plays a role in processes of cell growth, proliferation, migration, differentiation, and senescence in multiple contexts including in cancer. TGFB1I1 is most localized at focal adhesion complexes of cells, although it may be found active in the cytosol, nucleus and cell membrane as well.

== Functions ==
Transforming growth factor beta-1-induced transcript 1 plays a role in a number of cell functions. Originally, TGFB1I1 was isolated as a senescence-inducing gene from mouse osteoblastic cells through treatment with transforming growth factor beta-1 and hydrogen peroxide. During this, TGFB1I1 was also being independently discovered by numerous other groups and was characterized as a focal adhesion protein, an androgen and glucocorticoid receptor co-activator, a negative regulator of muscle differentiation, and major player in the recovery of arterial media.

== Interactions ==
TGFB1I1 has been shown to interact with:

- Androgen receptor,
- Dopamine transporter
- Hsp27,
- PTK2B,
- PTK2, and
- PTPN12.

== See also ==
- Transcription coregulator
