= ADP-ribosyl-(dinitrogen reductase) hydrolase =

Enzyme

ADP-ribosyl-[dinitrogen reductase] hydrolase
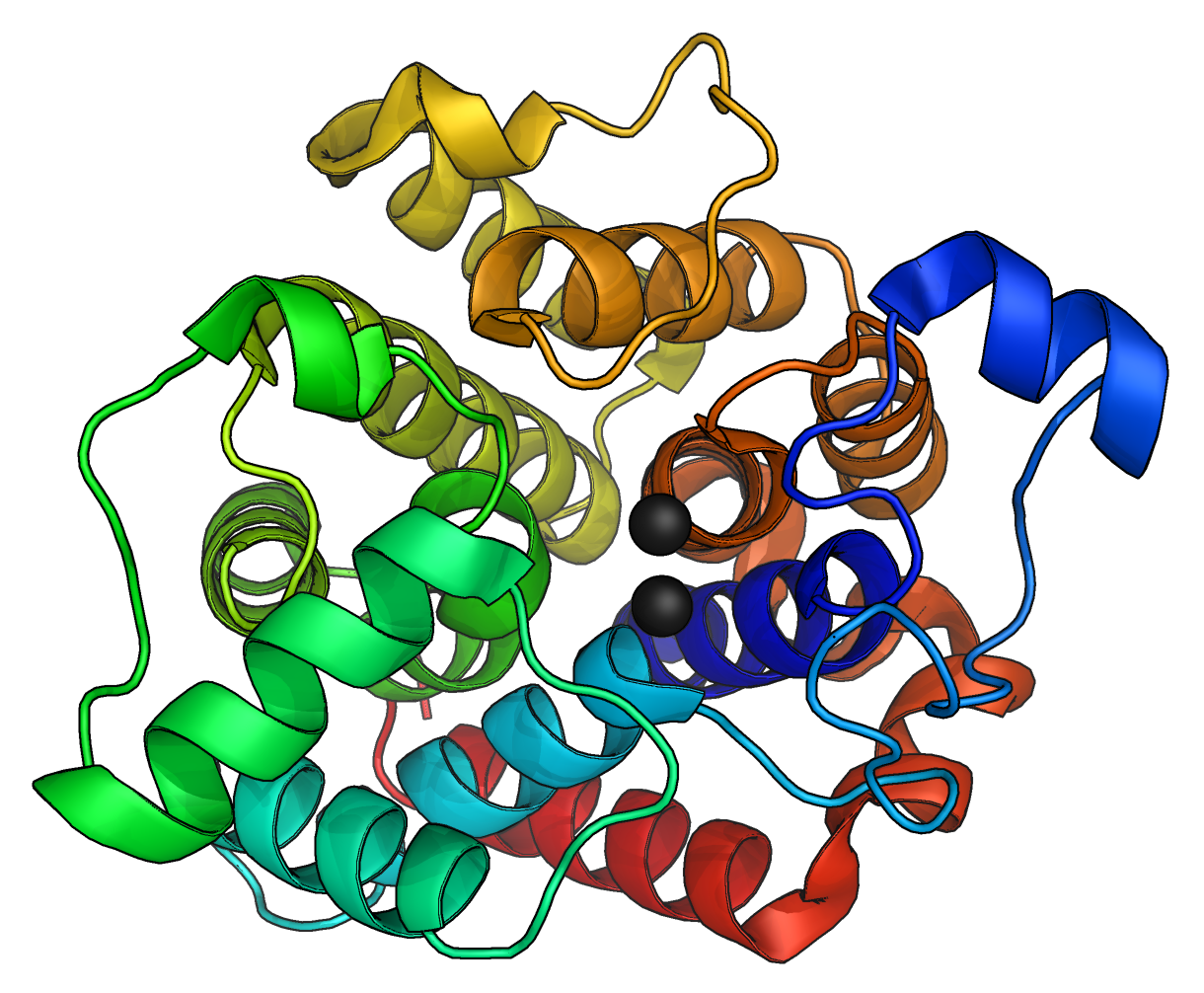
- Structure of dinitrogenase reductase-activating glycohydrolase (DraG) from Azospirillum brasilense (PDB 3G9D).

Identifiers
- EC no.: 3.2.2.24
- CAS no.: 125626-63-3

Databases
- IntEnz: IntEnz view
- BRENDA: BRENDA entry
- ExPASy: NiceZyme view
- KEGG: KEGG entry
- MetaCyc: metabolic pathway
- PRIAM: profile
- PDB structures: RCSB PDB PDBe PDBsum
- Gene Ontology: AmiGO / QuickGO
Search
- PMC: articles
- PubMed: articles
- NCBI: proteins

In enzymology, an ADP-ribosyl-[dinitrogen reductase] hydrolase (EC 3.2.2.24) is an enzyme that catalyzes the chemical reaction

ADP-D-ribosyl-[dinitrogen reductase] $\rightleftharpoons$ ADP-D-ribose + [dinitrogen reductase]

Hence, this enzyme has one substrate, [[ADP-D-ribosyl-[dinitrogen reductase]]], and two products, ADP-D-ribose and dinitrogen reductase.

This enzyme belongs to the family of hydrolases, specifically those glycosylases that hydrolyse N-glycosyl compounds. The systematic name of this enzyme class is ADP-D-ribosyl-[dinitrogen reductase] ADP-ribosylhydrolase. Other names in common use include azoferredoxin glycosidase, azoferredoxin-activating enzymes, dinitrogenase reductase-activating glycohydrolase, and ADP-ribosyl glycohydrolase.

== See also ==
- ADP-ribosylhydrolase
