= ADP-ribosylhydrolase 1 =

Protein found in humans

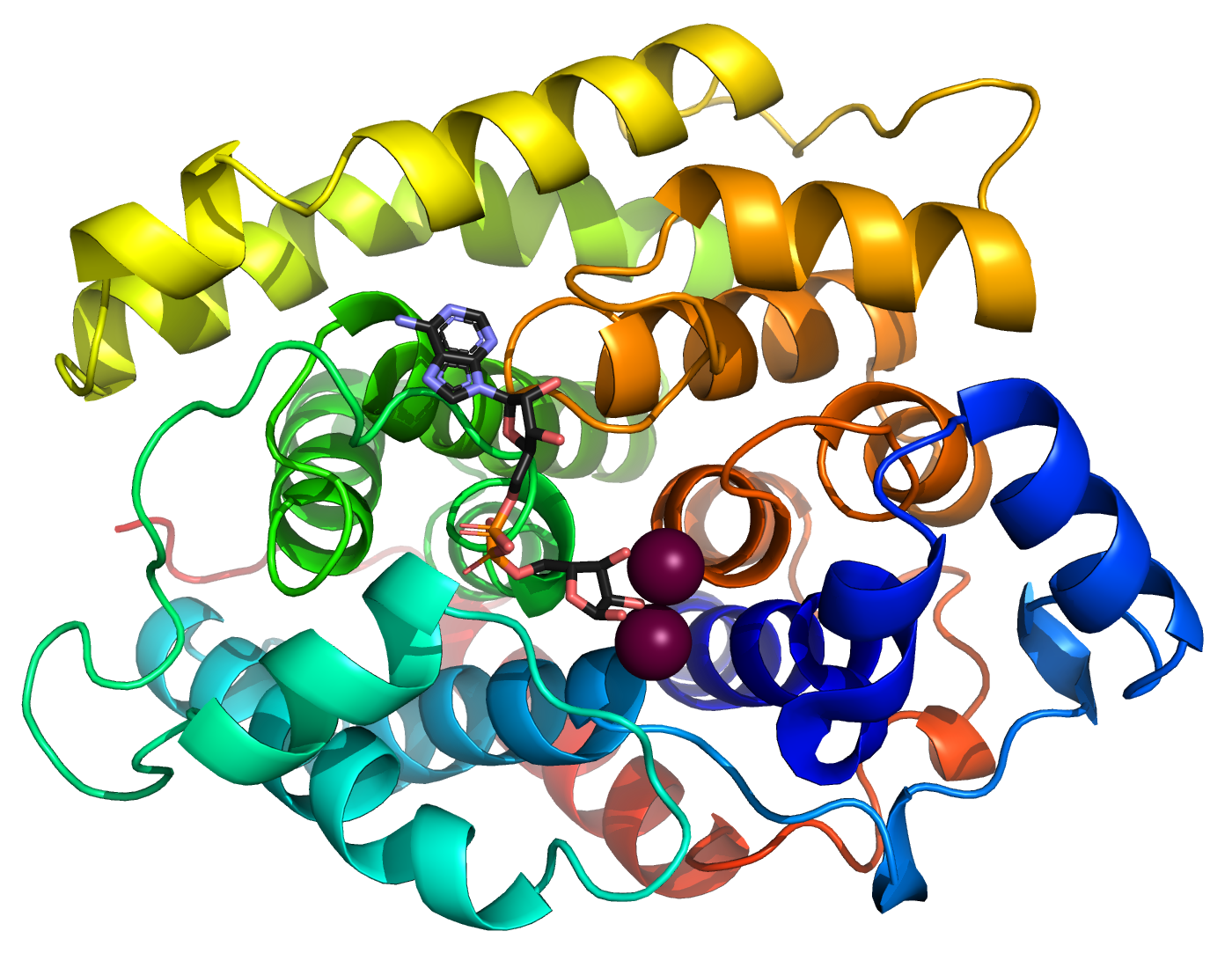
- Structure of human (ADP-ribosyl)hydrolase ARH1 in complex with ADP-ribose (PDB 6G28).

Identifiers
- EC no.: 3.2.2.19
- CAS no.: 98668-52-1

Databases
- BRENDA: enzyme data
- ExPASy: NiceZyme view
- KEGG: enzyme entry
- MetaCyc: metabolic pathway
- Rhea: reactions
- PDB structures: RCSB PDB PDBe PDBsum
Search
- PMC: articles
- PubMed: articles
- NCBI: proteins

(ADP-ribosyl)hydrolase 1, also termed [Protein ADP-ribosylarginine] hydrolase and protein-N^{ω}-(ADP-D-ribosyl)-L-arginine ADP-ribosylhydrolase (EC 3.2.2.19), is an enzyme that in humans is encoded by the ADPRH gene. This enzyme is a specific mono(ADP-ribosyl)hydrolase that catalyses the removal of an ADP-ribosyl modification from target arginine residues of protein substrates. The chemical reactions can formally be described as follows:

N^{ω}-(ADP-D-ribosyl)-L-arginyl-[protein] + H_{2}O $\rightleftharpoons$ ADP-D-ribose + L-arginyl-[protein]
In addition, the enzyme can reverse the ADP-ribosylation of free arginine:
N^{ω}-(ADP-D-ribosyl)-L-arginine + H_{2}O $\rightleftharpoons$ ADP-D-ribose + L-arginine

== See also ==
- ADP-ribosylhydrolase
