= ADP-ribosylhydrolase 2 =

Protein found in humans

ADPRHL1

Identifiers
- Aliases: ADPRHL1, ARH2, ADP-ribosylhydrolase like 1
- External IDs: OMIM: 610620; MGI: 2442168; GeneCards: ADPRHL1

Gene location (Human)
Chr.	Chromosome 13 (human)
Band	13q34	Start	113,399,610 bp
Band	13q34	End	113,453,524 bp

Gene location (Mouse)
Chr.	Chromosome 8 (mouse)
Band	8|8 A1.1	Start	13,271,663 bp
Band	8|8 A1.1	End	13,304,162 bp
RNA expression pattern
Bgee	Human / Mouse (ortholog); Top expressed in: myocardium of left ventricle; cardiac muscle tissue of right atrium; apex of heart; right auricle of heart; gastrocnemius muscle; muscle of thigh; right ventricle; tibialis anterior muscle; skeletal muscle tissue; quadriceps femoris muscle / Top expressed in: myocardium of ventricle; soleus muscle; left ventricle; muscle of thigh; atrioventricular valve; ankle; atrium; intercostal muscle; aortic valve; endocardial cushion; More reference expression data
BioGPS	n/a
Gene ontology
Molecular function	magnesium ion binding; hydrolase activity; ADP-ribosylarginine hydrolase activity; GTPase activator activity
Cellular component	endomembrane system; intracellular anatomical structure
Biological process	protein de-ADP-ribosylation; activation of GTPase activity; intracellular protein transport; regulation of vesicle fusion
Sources:Amigo / QuickGO
Orthologs
Databases	NCBI: entry; OMA: entry
Species	Human	Mouse
Entrez	113622	234072
Ensembl	ENSG00000153531	ENSMUSG00000031448
UniProt	Q8NDY3	Q8BGK2
RefSeq (mRNA)	NM_199162; NM_138430	NM_172750
RefSeq (protein)	NP_612439; NP_954631	NP_766338
Location (UCSC)	Chr 13: 113.4 – 113.45 Mb	Chr 8: 13.27 – 13.3 Mb
PubMed search
- Wikidata
View/Edit Human	View/Edit Mouse

(ADP-ribosyl)hydrolase 2 (ARH2) is a protein that in humans is encoded by the ADPRHL1 gene.

== Function ==
Proteins of the ADP-ribosylhydrolase family are typically associated with the reversal of ADP-ribosylation a posttranslational modification used to regulate protein function. However, ARH2 misses catalytically important residues and is predicted to be catalytically inactive. ARH2 is a cardiac-specific protein and expressed exclusively in the developing heart of vertebrates. Gene loss and loss-of-function mutations are associated with defective heart chamber growth and myofibrillogenesis.

== See also ==
- ADP-ribosylhydrolase
