= CRYGC =

Protein found in humans

Identifiers
- Aliases: CRYGC, CCL, CRYG3, CTRCT2, crystallin gamma C
- External IDs: OMIM: 123680; MGI: 88523; GeneCards: CRYGC
Available structures
PDB	Ortholog search: PDBe RCSB
PDB	List of PDB id codes 2NBR

Gene location (Human)
Chr.	Chromosome 2 (human)
Band	2q33.3	Start	208,128,137 bp
Band	2q33.3	End	208,129,828 bp

Gene location (Mouse)
Chr.	Chromosome 1 (mouse)
Band	1 C2|1 32.81 cM	Start	65,110,684 bp
Band	1 C2|1 32.81 cM	End	65,112,848 bp
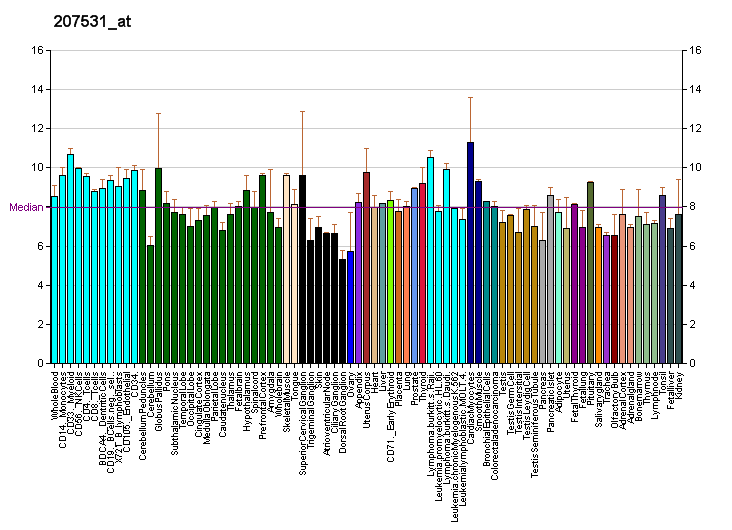
RNA expression pattern
Bgee	Human / Mouse (ortholog); Top expressed in: testicle; gonad; left testis; right testis; gastric mucosa; duodenum; hypothalamus; islet of Langerhans; C1 segment; pituitary gland / Top expressed in: lens; cornea; corneal stroma; urethra; female urethra; blastocyst; male urethra; epithelium of urethra; epithelium of male urethra; epithelium of female urethra; More reference expression data
BioGPS	More reference expression data
Gene ontology
Molecular function	protein binding; structural constituent of eye lens
Cellular component	cytoplasm; nucleus
Biological process	visual perception; lens development in camera-type eye
Sources:Amigo / QuickGO
Orthologs
Databases	NCBI: entry; OMA: entry
Species	Human	Mouse
Entrez	1420	12966
Ensembl	ENSG00000163254; ENSG00000285011	ENSMUSG00000025952
UniProt	P07315	Q61597
RefSeq (mRNA)	NM_020989	NM_001082573; NM_007775
RefSeq (protein)	NP_066269	NP_001076042; NP_031801
Location (UCSC)	Chr 2: 208.13 – 208.13 Mb	Chr 1: 65.11 – 65.11 Mb
PubMed search
- Wikidata
View/Edit Human	View/Edit Mouse

Crystallin, gamma C, also known as CRYGC, is a protein which in humans is encoded by the CRYGC gene.

== Function ==
Crystallins are separated into two classes: taxon-specific, or enzyme, and ubiquitous. The latter class constitutes the major proteins of vertebrate eye lens and maintains the transparency and refractive index of the lens. Since lens central fiber cells lose their nuclei during development, these crystallins are made and then retained throughout life, making them extremely stable proteins. Mammalian lens crystallins are divided into alpha, beta, and gamma families; beta and gamma crystallins are also considered as a superfamily. Alpha and beta families are further divided into acidic and basic groups. Seven protein regions exist in crystallins: four homologous motifs, a connecting peptide, and N- and C-terminal extensions. Gamma-crystallins are a homogeneous group of highly symmetrical, monomeric proteins typically lacking connecting peptides and terminal extensions. They are differentially regulated after early development. Four gamma-crystallin genes (gamma-A through gamma-D) and three pseudogenes (gamma-E, gamma-F, gamma-G) are organized in a genomic segment as a gene cluster. Whether due to aging or mutations in specific genes, gamma-crystallins have been involved in cataract formation.

== Interactions ==
CRYGC has been shown to interact with CRYBB2, CRYAA and CRYAB.
