= CRYAA =

Protein-coding gene in the species Homo sapiens

Identifiers
- Aliases: CRYAA, CRYA1, CTRCT9, HSPB4, crystallin alpha A
- External IDs: OMIM: 123580; MGI: 88515; GeneCards: CRYAA

Gene location (Human)
Chr.	Chromosome 21 (human)
Band	21q22.3	Start	43,169,008 bp
Band	21q22.3	End	43,172,805 bp

Gene location (Mouse)
Chr.	Chromosome 17 (mouse)
Band	17 B1|17 17.09 cM	Start	31,896,781 bp
Band	17 B1|17 17.09 cM	End	31,900,707 bp
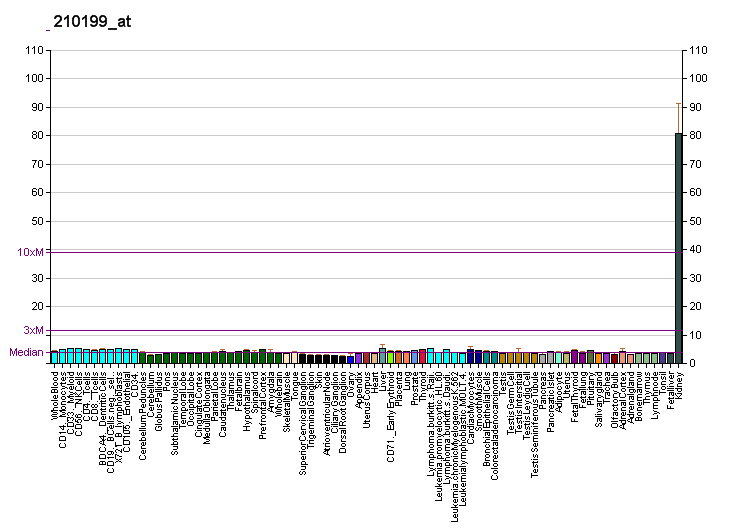
RNA expression pattern
Bgee	Human / Mouse (ortholog); Top expressed in: right lobe of liver; duodenum; prefrontal cortex; human kidney; primary visual cortex; temporal lobe; amygdala; hippocampus proper; anterior cingulate cortex; caudate nucleus / Top expressed in: lens; epithelium of lens; corneal stroma; neural layer of retina; ciliary body; conjunctival fornix; retinal pigment epithelium; iris; decidua; gastrula; More reference expression data
BioGPS	More reference expression data
Gene ontology
Molecular function	unfolded protein binding; protein binding; metal ion binding; structural constituent of eye lens; identical protein binding
Cellular component	cytoplasm; nucleus; nucleoplasm; cytosol
Biological process	negative regulation of intracellular transport; negative regulation of apoptotic process; protein homooligomerization; protein refolding; response to stimulus; visual perception; protein stabilization
Sources:Amigo / QuickGO
Orthologs
Databases	NCBI: entry; OMA: entry
Species	Human	Mouse
Entrez	1409	12954
Ensembl	ENSG00000160202	ENSMUSG00000024041
UniProt	P02489	P24622
RefSeq (mRNA)	NM_000394; NM_001363766	NM_001278569; NM_001278570; NM_013501
RefSeq (protein)	NP_000385; NP_001350695; NP_001300979; NP_001307648	NP_001265498; NP_001265499; NP_038529
Location (UCSC)	Chr 21: 43.17 – 43.17 Mb	Chr 17: 31.9 – 31.9 Mb
PubMed search
- Wikidata
View/Edit Human	View/Edit Mouse

Alpha-crystallin A chain is a protein that in humans is encoded by the CRYAA gene.

Crystallins are separated into two classes: taxon-specific, or enzyme, and ubiquitous. The latter class constitutes the major proteins of vertebrate eye lens and maintains the transparency and refractive index of the lens. Since lens central fiber cells lose their nuclei during development, these crystallins are made and then retained throughout life, making them extremely stable proteins. Mammalian lens crystallins are divided into alpha, beta, and gamma families; beta and gamma crystallins are also considered as a superfamily. Alpha and beta families are further divided into acidic and basic groups. Seven protein regions exist in crystallins: four homologous motifs, a connecting peptide, and N- and C-terminal extensions. Alpha crystallins are composed of two gene products: alpha-A and alpha-B, for acidic and basic, respectively. Alpha crystallins can be induced by heat shock and are members of the small heat shock protein (sHSP also known as the HSP20) family. They act as molecular chaperones although they do not renature proteins and release them in the fashion of a true chaperone; instead they hold them in large soluble aggregates. Post-translational modifications decrease the ability to chaperone. These heterogeneous aggregates consist of 30-40 subunits; the alpha-A and alpha-B subunits have a 3:1 ratio, respectively. Two additional functions of alpha crystallins are an autokinase activity and participation in the intracellular architecture. Alpha-A and alpha-B gene products are differentially expressed; alpha-A is preferentially restricted to the lens and alpha-B is expressed widely in many tissues and organs. Defects in this gene cause autosomal dominant congenital cataract (ADCC).

== Interactions ==
CRYAA has been shown to interact with CRYBB2, Hsp27, CRYGC and CRYAB.
