= CRYBB2 =

Protein-coding gene in the species Homo sapiens

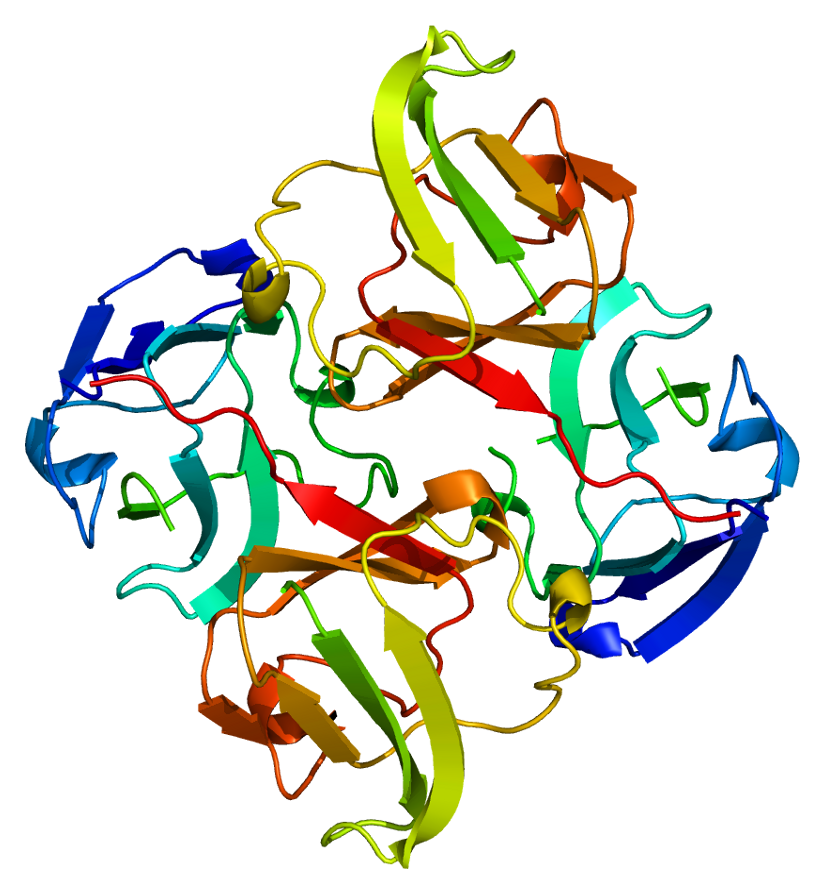

Identifiers
- Aliases: CRYBB2, CCA2, CRYB2, CRYB2A, CTRCT3, D22S665, crystallin beta B2
- External IDs: OMIM: 123620; MGI: 88519; GeneCards: CRYBB2
Available structures
PDB	Ortholog search: PDBe RCSB
PDB	List of PDB id codes 1YTQ

Gene location (Human)
Chr.	Chromosome 22 (human)
Band	22q11.23	Start	25,212,564 bp
Band	22q11.23	End	25,231,870 bp

Gene location (Mouse)
Chr.	Chromosome 5 (mouse)
Band	5 F|5 55.38 cM	Start	113,206,124 bp
Band	5 F|5 55.38 cM	End	113,217,983 bp
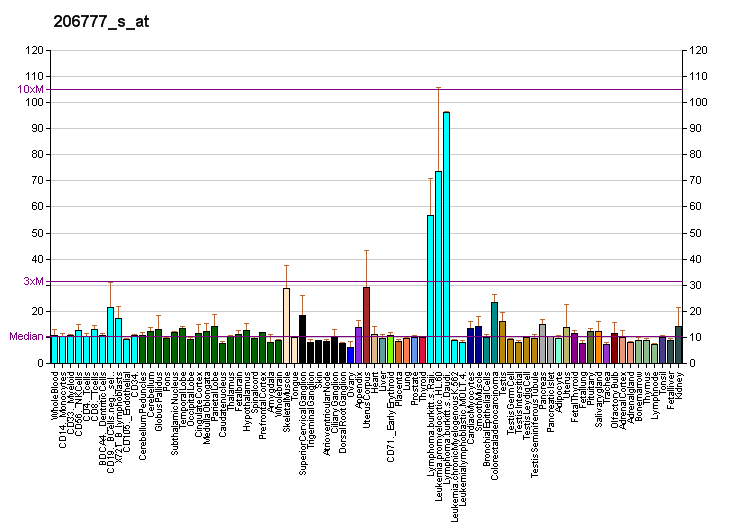

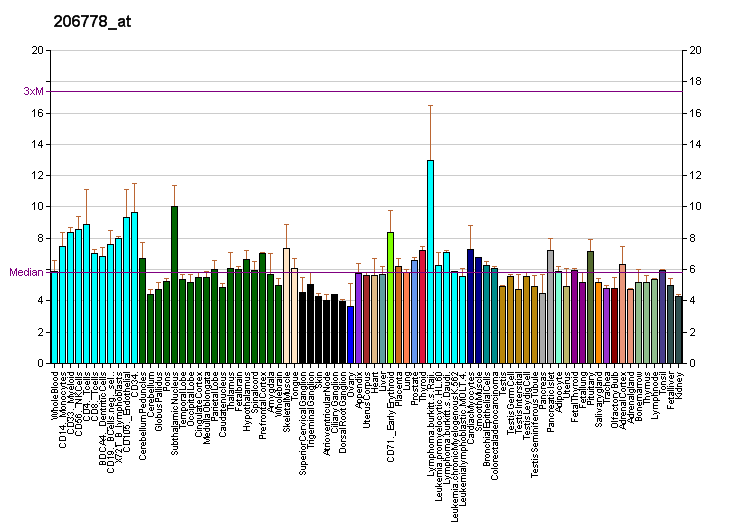
RNA expression pattern
Bgee	Human / Mouse (ortholog); Top expressed in: stromal cell of endometrium; nucleus accumbens; mucosa of transverse colon; anterior cingulate cortex; putamen; amygdala; caudate nucleus; mucosa of nose; pituitary gland; left lobe of thyroid gland / Top expressed in: epithelium of lens; corneal stroma; neural layer of retina; ciliary body; retinal pigment epithelium; conjunctival fornix; iris; brain stem; anterior horn of spinal cord; placenta; More reference expression data
BioGPS	More reference expression data
Orthologs
Databases	NCBI: entry; OMA: entry
Species	Human	Mouse
Entrez	1415	12961
Ensembl	ENSG00000244752	ENSMUSG00000042240
UniProt	P43320	P62696
RefSeq (mRNA)	NM_000496	NM_007773
RefSeq (protein)	NP_000487	NP_031799
Location (UCSC)	Chr 22: 25.21 – 25.23 Mb	Chr 5: 113.21 – 113.22 Mb
PubMed search
- Wikidata
View/Edit Human	View/Edit Mouse

Beta-crystallin B2 is a protein that in humans is encoded by the CRYBB2 gene.

== Function ==
Crystallins are separated into two classes: taxon-specific, or enzyme, and ubiquitous. The latter class constitutes the major proteins of vertebrate eye lens and maintains the transparency and refractive index of the lens. Since lens central fiber cells lose their nuclei during development, these crystallins are made and then retained throughout life, making them extremely stable proteins. Mammalian lens crystallins are divided into alpha, beta, and gamma families; beta and gamma crystallins are also considered as a superfamily. Alpha and beta families are further divided into acidic and basic groups. Seven protein regions exist in crystallins: four homologous motifs, a connecting peptide, and N-terminal and C-terminal extensions. Beta-crystallins, the most heterogeneous, differ by the presence of the C-terminal extension (present in the basic group, none in the acidic group). Beta-crystallins form aggregates of different sizes and are able to self-associate to form dimers or to form heterodimers with other beta-crystallins. This gene, a beta basic group member, is part of a gene cluster with beta-A4, beta-B1, and beta-B3. A chain-terminating mutation was found to cause type 2 cerulean cataracts.

== Interactions ==
CRYBB2 has been shown to interact with Hsp27, CRYGC, CRYAA and CRYAB.
