= CRYBB3 =

Protein-coding gene in the species Homo sapiens

Identifiers
- Aliases: CRYBB3, CATCN2, CRYB3, CTRCT22, crystallin beta B3
- External IDs: OMIM: 123630; MGI: 102717; GeneCards: CRYBB3
Available structures
PDB	Ortholog search: PDBe RCSB
PDB	List of PDB id codes 3QK3

Gene location (Human)
Chr.	Chromosome 22 (human)
Band	22q11.23	Start	25,199,858 bp
Band	22q11.23	End	25,207,359 bp

Gene location (Mouse)
Chr.	Chromosome 5 (mouse)
Band	5 F|5 55.38 cM	Start	113,075,839 bp
Band	5 F|5 55.38 cM	End	113,081,584 bp
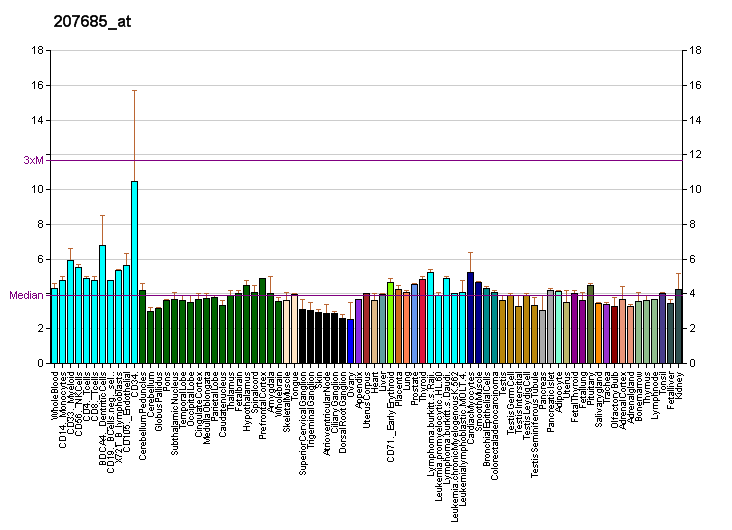
RNA expression pattern
Bgee	Human / Mouse (ortholog); Top expressed in: testicle; mucosa of transverse colon; right lobe of liver; lens; left lobe of thyroid gland; right lobe of thyroid gland; human kidney; minor salivary glands; right uterine tube; ascending aorta / Top expressed in: lens; epithelium of lens; conjunctival fornix; retinal pigment epithelium; ciliary body; neural layer of retina; iris; cornea; embryo; embryo; More reference expression data
BioGPS	More reference expression data
Orthologs
Databases	NCBI: entry; OMA: entry
Species	Human	Mouse
Entrez	1417	12962
Ensembl	ENSG00000100053	ENSMUSG00000029352
UniProt	P26998	Q9JJU9
RefSeq (mRNA)	NM_004076	NM_001159650; NM_021352
RefSeq (protein)	NP_004067	NP_001153122; NP_067327; NP_001345933; NP_001345934; NP_001345935 NP_001345936; NP_001345937
Location (UCSC)	Chr 22: 25.2 – 25.21 Mb	Chr 5: 113.08 – 113.08 Mb
PubMed search
- Wikidata
View/Edit Human	View/Edit Mouse

Beta-crystallin B3 is a protein that in humans is encoded by the CRYBB3 gene.

Crystallins are separated into two classes: taxon-specific, or enzyme, and ubiquitous. The latter class constitutes the major proteins of vertebrate eye lens and maintains the transparency and refractive index of the lens. Since lens central fiber cells lose their nuclei during development, these crystallins are made and then retained throughout life, making them extremely stable proteins.

Mammalian lens crystallins are divided into alpha, beta, and gamma families; beta and gamma crystallins are also considered as a superfamily. Alpha and beta families are further divided into acidic and basic groups. Seven protein regions exist in crystallins: four homologous motifs, a connecting peptide, and N- and C-terminal extensions.

Beta-crystallins, the most heterogeneous, differ by the presence of the C-terminal extension (present in the basic group, none in the acidic group). Beta-crystallins form aggregates of different sizes and are able to self-associate to form dimers or to form heterodimers with other beta-crystallins. This gene, a beta basic group member, is part of a gene cluster with beta-A4, beta-B1, and beta-B2.
