= HSPB8 =

Identifiers
- Aliases: HSPB8, CMT2L, DHMN2, E2IG1, H11, HMN2, HMN2A, HSP22, heat shock protein family B (small) member 8
- External IDs: OMIM: 608014; MGI: 2135756; GeneCards: HSPB8

Gene location (Human)
Chr.	Chromosome 12 (human)
Band	12q24.23	Start	119,171,555 bp
Band	12q24.23	End	119,224,855 bp

Gene location (Mouse)
Chr.	Chromosome 5 (mouse)
Band	5 F|5 56.41 cM	Start	116,546,550 bp
Band	5 F|5 56.41 cM	End	116,560,923 bp
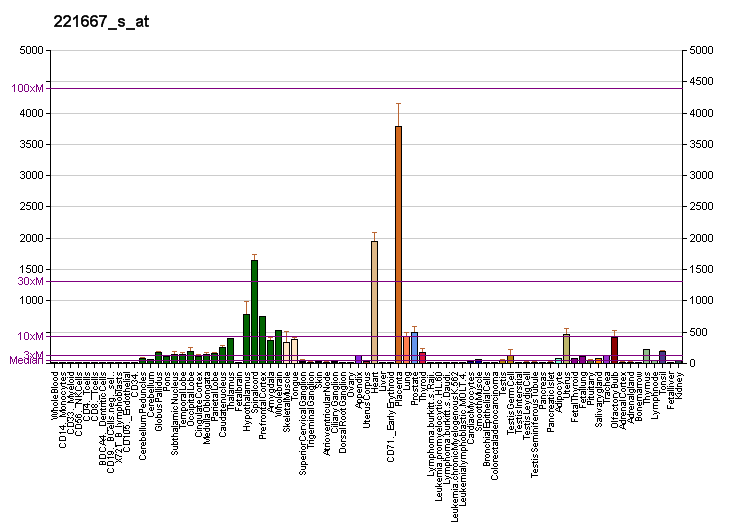
RNA expression pattern
Bgee	Human / Mouse (ortholog); Top expressed in: Skeletal muscle tissue of rectus abdominis; gastric mucosa; gastrocnemius muscle; muscle of thigh; left ventricle; right auricle of heart; right ventricle; glutes; body of tongue; apex of heart / Top expressed in: gastrula; muscle of thigh; facial motor nucleus; right ventricle; decidua; gastrocnemius muscle; lip; triceps brachii muscle; ankle; myocardium of ventricle; More reference expression data
BioGPS	More reference expression data
Gene ontology
Molecular function	protein kinase activity; protein binding; identical protein binding; protein homodimerization activity
Cellular component	cytoplasm; intracellular anatomical structure; nucleus; nucleoplasm; cytosol; chaperone complex
Biological process	regulation of cellular response to heat; biological process; protein phosphorylation; Unfolded protein response; positive regulation of aggrephagy
Sources:Amigo / QuickGO
Orthologs
Databases	NCBI: entry; OMA: entry
Species	Human	Mouse
Entrez	26353	80888
Ensembl	ENSG00000152137	ENSMUSG00000041548
UniProt	Q9UJY1	Q9JK92
RefSeq (mRNA)	NM_014365	NM_030704
RefSeq (protein)	NP_055180	NP_109629.1
Location (UCSC)	Chr 12: 119.17 – 119.22 Mb	Chr 5: 116.55 – 116.56 Mb
PubMed search
- Wikidata
View/Edit Human	View/Edit Mouse

Heat shock protein beta-8 is a protein that in humans is encoded by the HSPB8 gene.

== Interactions ==
HSPB8 has been shown to interact with:

- HSPB2, and
- Hsp27.

== Clinical importance ==
Mutations in this gene have been associated with an autosomal dominant rimmed vacuolar myopathy The clinical features of this condition are distal and proximal myopathy. MRI show severe relatively symmetric multifocal fatty degenerative changes within the muscles. Muscle biopsy shows rimmed vacuoles, muscle fiber atrophy and endomysial fibrosis.
