= HSPB2 =

Protein-coding gene in the species Homo sapiens

Identifiers
- Aliases: HSPB2, HSP27, Hs.78846, LOH11CR1K, MKBP, heat shock protein family B (small) member 2
- External IDs: OMIM: 602179; MGI: 1916503; GeneCards: HSPB2

Gene location (Human)
Chr.	Chromosome 11 (human)
Band	11q23.1	Start	111,912,734 bp
Band	11q23.1	End	111,914,093 bp

Gene location (Mouse)
Chr.	Chromosome 9 (mouse)
Band	9 A5.3|9 27.75 cM	Start	50,662,378 bp
Band	9 A5.3|9 27.75 cM	End	50,663,654 bp
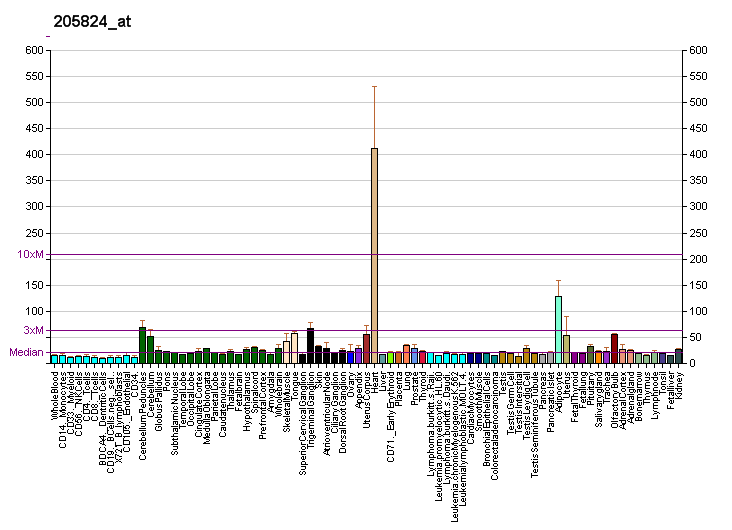
RNA expression pattern
Bgee	Human / Mouse (ortholog); Top expressed in: right auricle of heart; apex of heart; muscle of thigh; left ventricle; gastrocnemius muscle; Descending thoracic aorta; ascending aorta; popliteal artery; tibial arteries; gastric mucosa / Top expressed in: interventricular septum; extraocular muscle; plantaris muscle; cardiac muscle tissue of left ventricle; extensor digitorum longus muscle; right ventricle; muscle of thigh; soleus muscle; temporal muscle; ankle; More reference expression data
BioGPS	More reference expression data
Gene ontology
Molecular function	enzyme activator activity; protein binding
Cellular component	cytoplasm; cytosol; nucleus
Biological process	response to unfolded protein; positive regulation of catalytic activity
Sources:Amigo / QuickGO
Orthologs
Databases	NCBI: entry; OMA: entry
Species	Human	Mouse
Entrez	3316	69253
Ensembl	ENSG00000170276	ENSMUSG00000038086
UniProt	Q16082	Q99PR8
RefSeq (mRNA)	NM_001541	NM_001164708; NM_024441
RefSeq (protein)	NP_001532	NP_001158180.1; NP_077761.3
Location (UCSC)	Chr 11: 111.91 – 111.91 Mb	Chr 9: 50.66 – 50.66 Mb
PubMed search
- Wikidata
View/Edit Human	View/Edit Mouse

Heat shock protein beta-2 is a protein that in humans is encoded by the HSPB2 gene.

== Interactions ==
HSPB2 has been shown to interact with:

- CRYAB,
- HSPB8,
- Myotonic dystrophy protein kinase and
- TRAF6.
