= CRYAB =

Protein-coding gene in humans

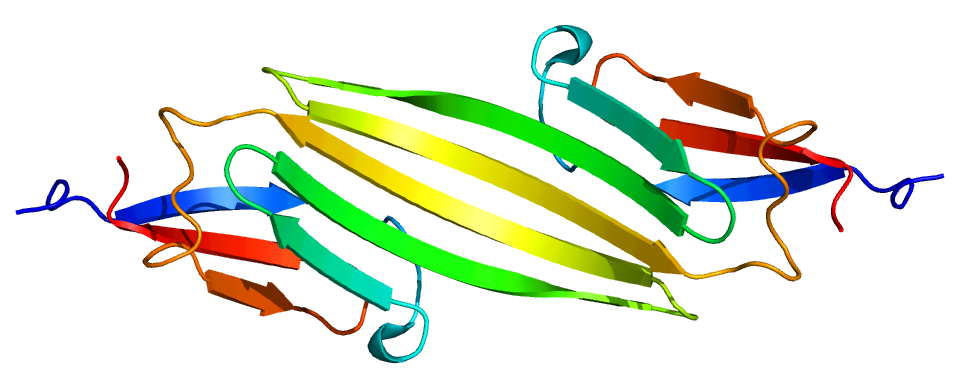

Identifiers
- Aliases: CRYAB, CMD1II, CRYA2, CTPP2, CTRCT16, HEL-S-101, HSPB5, MFM2, crystallin alpha B
- External IDs: OMIM: 123590; MGI: 88516; GeneCards: CRYAB
Available structures
PDB	Ortholog search: PDBe RCSB
PDB	List of PDB id codes 2KLR, 2N0K, 2WJ7, 2Y1Y, 2Y1Z, 2Y22, 2YGD, 3L1G, 3SGM, 3SGN, 3SGO, 3SGP, 3SGR, 3SGS, 4M5S, 4M5T, 3J07

Gene location (Human)
Chr.	Chromosome 11 (human)
Band	11q23.1	Start	111,908,564 bp
Band	11q23.1	End	111,923,722 bp

Gene location (Mouse)
Chr.	Chromosome 9 (mouse)
Band	9 A5.3|9 27.75 cM	Start	50,662,625 bp
Band	9 A5.3|9 27.75 cM	End	50,667,936 bp
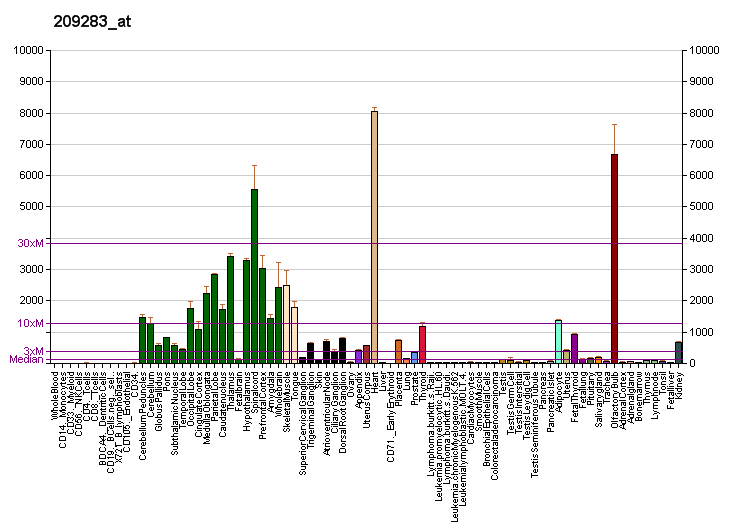
RNA expression pattern
Bgee	Human / Mouse (ortholog); Top expressed in: myocardium of left ventricle; middle frontal gyrus; right auricle of heart; C1 segment; olfactory bulb; apex of heart; muscle of thigh; optic nerve; inferior ganglion of vagus nerve; right ventricle / Top expressed in: epithelium of lens; ciliary body; iris; myocardium of ventricle; soleus muscle; sciatic nerve; gastrula; intercostal muscle; retinal pigment epithelium; masseter muscle; More reference expression data
BioGPS	More reference expression data
Gene ontology
Molecular function	protein homodimerization activity; microtubule binding; unfolded protein binding; metal ion binding; cytoskeletal protein binding; protein binding; structural constituent of eye lens; identical protein binding; amyloid-beta binding; protein-containing complex binding
Cellular component	cytoplasm; Golgi apparatus; I band; microtubule cytoskeleton; nucleoplasm; cell surface; actin filament bundle; extracellular exosome; nucleus; cardiac myofibril; perikaryon; dendritic spine; synaptic membrane; synapse; M band; postsynaptic density; axon; mitochondrion; cytosol; plasma membrane; Z discdkac; contractile fiber; protein-containing complex
Biological process	negative regulation of intracellular transport; response to estradiol; muscle contraction; regulation of cell death; ageing; negative regulation of apoptotic process; microtubule polymerization or depolymerization; protein folding; stress-activated MAPK cascade; negative regulation of cell growth; cellular response to gamma radiation; regulation of cellular response to heat; negative regulation of reactive oxygen species metabolic process; protein homooligomerization; response to hydrogen peroxide; response to hypoxia; lens development in camera-type eye; tubulin complex assembly; muscle organ development; multicellular organism aging; negative regulation of gene expression; negative regulation of protein homooligomerization; camera-type eye development; negative regulation of cysteine-type endopeptidase activity involved in apoptotic process; protein stabilization; apoptotic process involved in morphogenesis; negative regulation of amyloid fibril formation; negative regulation of transcription, DNA-templated
Sources:Amigo / QuickGO
Orthologs
Databases	NCBI: entry; OMA: entry
Species	Human	Mouse
Entrez	1410	12955
Ensembl	ENSG00000109846	ENSMUSG00000032060
UniProt	P02511	P23927
RefSeq (mRNA)	NM_001289807; NM_001289808; NM_001885; NM_001330379; NM_001368245 NM_001368246	NM_001289782; NM_001289784; NM_001289785; NM_009964
RefSeq (protein)	NP_001276736; NP_001276737; NP_001317308; NP_001876; NP_001355174 NP_001355175	NP_001276711; NP_001276713; NP_001276714; NP_034094
Location (UCSC)	Chr 11: 111.91 – 111.92 Mb	Chr 9: 50.66 – 50.67 Mb
PubMed search
- Wikidata
View/Edit Human	View/Edit Mouse

Alpha-crystallin B chain is a protein that in humans is encoded by the CRYAB gene. It is part of the small heat shock protein family and functions as molecular chaperone that primarily binds misfolded proteins to prevent protein aggregation, as well as inhibit apoptosis and contribute to intracellular architecture. Post-translational modifications decrease the ability to chaperone. Mutations in CRYAB cause different cardiomyopathies, skeletal myopathies mainly myofibrillar myopathy, and also cataracts. In addition, defects in this gene/protein have been associated with cancer and neurodegenerative diseases such as Alzheimer's disease and Parkinson's disease.

== Structure ==
Crystallins are separated into two classes: taxon-specific, or enzyme, and ubiquitous. The latter class constitutes the major proteins of vertebrate eye lens and maintains the transparency and refractive index of the lens. Since lens central fiber cells lose their nuclei during development, these crystallins are made and then retained throughout life, making them extremely stable proteins. Mammalian lens crystallins are divided into alpha, beta, and gamma families; beta and gamma crystallins are also considered as a superfamily. Alpha and beta families are further divided into acidic and basic groups.

Seven protein regions exist in crystallins: four homologous motifs, a connecting peptide, and N- and C-terminal extensions. Alpha crystallins are composed of two gene products: alpha-A and alpha-B, for acidic and basic, respectively. These heterogeneous aggregates consist of 30–40 subunits; the alpha-A and alpha-B subunits have a 3:1 ratio, respectively.

== Function ==
Alpha B chain crystallins (αBC) can be induced by heat shock, ischemia, and oxidation, and are members of the small heat shock protein (sHSP also known as the HSP20) family. They act as molecular chaperones although they do not renature proteins and release them in the fashion of a true chaperone; instead, they bind improperly folded proteins to prevent protein aggregation.

Furthermore, αBC may confer stress resistance to cells by inhibiting the processing of the pro-apoptotic protein caspase-3. Two additional functions of alpha crystallins are an autokinase activity and participation in the intracellular architecture. Alpha-A and alpha-B gene products are differentially expressed; alpha-A is preferentially restricted to the lens and alpha-B is expressed widely in many tissues and organs. Elevated expression of alpha-B crystallin occurs in many neurological diseases; a missense mutation cosegregated in a family with a desmin-related myopathy.

== Clinical significance ==
Although not yet clearly understood, defective chaperone activity is expected to trigger the accumulation of protein aggregates and underlie the development of α-crystallinopathy, or the failure of protein quality control, resulting in protein deposition diseases such as Alzheimer’s disease and Parkinson’s disease. Mutations in CRYAB could also cause restrictive cardiomyopathy. ER-anchored αBC can suppress aggregate formation mediated by the disease mutant. Thus, modulation of the micromilieu surrounding the ER membrane can serve as a potential target in developing pharmacological interventions for protein deposition disease.

Though expressed highly in eye lens and muscle tissues, αBC can also be found in several types of cancer, among which head and neck squamous cell carcinoma (HNSCC) and breast carcinomas, as well as in patients with tuberous sclerosis. αBC expression is associated with metastasis formation in HNSCC and in breast carcinomas and in other types of cancer, expression is often correlated with poor prognosis as well. The expression of αBC can be increased during various stresses, like heat shock, osmotic stress or exposure to heavy metals, which then may lead to prolonged survival of cells under these conditions.

== Interactions ==
CRYAB has been shown to interact with:

- CRYAA,
- CRYBB2,
- CRYGC,
- HSPB2,
- Hsp27, and
- PSMA3.
