= Crystallin =

Protein found in the eye

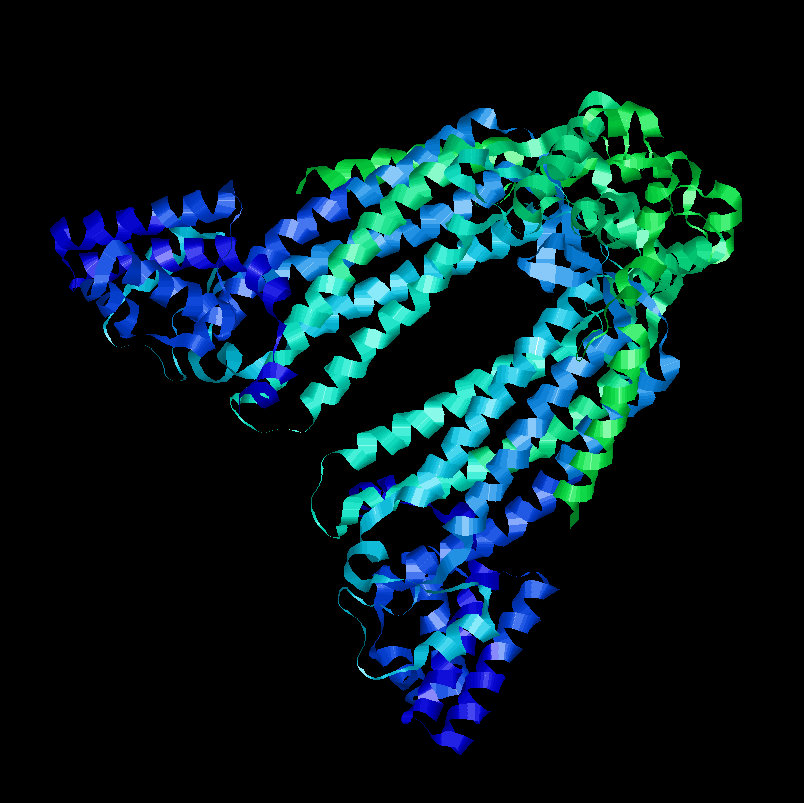
Crystal structure of Duck Delta 1 Crystallin, based on the PDB file 1HY0.

In anatomy, a crystallin is a water-soluble structural protein found in the lens and the cornea of the eye accounting for the transparency of the structure. It has also been identified in other places such as the heart, and in aggressive breast cancer tumors. The physical origins of eye lens transparency and its relationship to cataract are an active area of research. Since it has been shown that lens injury may promote nerve regeneration, crystallin has been an area of neural research. So far, it has been demonstrated that crystallin β b2 (crybb2) may be a neurite-promoting factor.

== Function ==
The main function of crystallins at least in the lens of the eye is probably to increase the refractive index while not obstructing light. However, this is not their only function. It has become clear that crystallins may have several metabolic and regulatory functions, both within the lens and in other parts of the body. More proteins containing βγ-crystallin domains have now been characterized as calcium binding proteins with Greek key motif as a novel calcium-binding motif.

== Enzyme activity and evolution ==
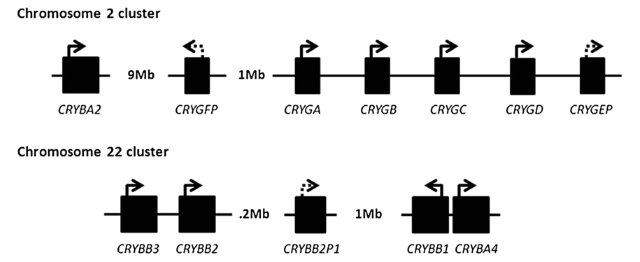
Human crystallin gene clusters on chromosomes 2 and 22.

Some crystallins are active enzymes, while others lack activity but show homology to other enzymes. The crystallins of different groups of organisms are related to a large number of different proteins, with those from birds and reptiles related to lactate dehydrogenase and argininosuccinate lyase, those of mammals to alcohol dehydrogenase and quinone reductase, and those of cephalopods to glutathione S-transferase and aldehyde dehydrogenase. These particular enzymes or some mutated forms happened to be transparent and highly soluble and thus potential building material for animal lenses. The recruitment of protein that originally evolved with one function to serve a second, unrelated function is an example of an exaptation.

While crystallins appear to have evolved from enzymes, most copies in the human genome have arisen from gene duplications. Most notably, there are 2 gene clusters in the human genome, one on chromosome 2 and one on chromosome 22.

== Classification ==
Crystallins from a vertebrate eye lens are classified into three main types: alpha, beta and gamma crystallins. These distinctions are based on the order in which they elute from a gel filtration chromatography column. These are also called ubiquitous crystallins. Beta and gamma crystallins (such as CRYGC) are similar in sequence, structure and domains topology, and thus have been grouped together as a protein superfamily called βγ-Crystallins. The α-crystallin family and βγ-crystallins compose the major family of proteins present in the crystalline lens. They occur in all vertebrate classes (though gamma-crystallins are low or absent in avian lenses); and delta-crystallin is found exclusively in reptiles and birds.

In addition to these crystallins there are other taxon-specific crystallins which are only found in the lens of some organisms; these include delta, epsilon, tau, and iota crystallins. For example, alpha, beta, and delta crystallins are found in avian and reptilian lenses, and the alpha, beta, and gamma families are found in the lenses of all other vertebrates.

=== Alpha crystallin ===
Alpha crystallin A chain, N terminal

Identifiers
- Symbol: Crystallin
- Pfam: PF00525
- InterPro: IPR003090
Available protein structures:
- PDB: IPR003090 PF00525 (ECOD; PDBsum)
- AlphaFold: IPR003090; PF00525

Alpha crystallin occurs as large aggregates, comprising two types of related subunits (A and B) that are highly similar to the small (15–30kDa) heat shock proteins (sHsps), particularly in their C-terminal halves. The relationship between these families is one of classic gene duplication and divergence, from the small HSP family, allowing adaptation to novel functions. Divergence probably occurred prior to evolution of the eye lens, alpha crystallin being found in small amounts in tissues outside the lens.

Alpha crystallin has chaperone-like properties including the ability to prevent the precipitation of denatured proteins and to increase cellular tolerance to stress. It has been suggested that these functions are important for the maintenance of lens transparency and the prevention of cataracts. This is supported by the observation that alpha-crystallin mutations show an association with cataract formation.

The N-terminal domain of alpha crystallin is not necessary for dimerisation or chaperone activity, but appears to be required for the formation of higher order aggregates.

=== Beta and gamma crystallin ===
Beta/Gamma crystallin

Identifiers
- Symbol: Crystallin
- Pfam: PF00030
- InterPro: IPR001064
- PROSITE: PDOC00197
- SCOP2: 4gcr / SCOPe / SUPFAM
Available protein structures:
- PDB: IPR001064 PF00030 (ECOD; PDBsum)
- AlphaFold: IPR001064; PF00030

Beta and gamma crystallins form a separate family. Structurally, beta and gamma crystallins are composed of two similar domains which, in turn, are each composed of two similar motifs with the two domains connected by a short connecting peptide. Each motif, which is about forty amino acid residues long, is folded in a distinctive Greek key pattern. However, beta crystallins are oligomers, composed of a complex group of molecules, whereas gamma crystallins are simpler monomers.

List of Human Crystallins
UniProt Entry name	Alternate Gene names	Length
AIM1L_HUMAN	AIM1L CRYBG2	616
AIM1_HUMAN	AIM1 CRYBG1	1723
ARLY_HUMAN	ASL	464
CRBA1_HUMAN	CRYBA1 CRYB1	215
CRBA2_HUMAN	CRYBA2	197
CRBB1_HUMAN	CRYBB1	252
CRBA4_HUMAN	CRYBA4	196
CRBB2_HUMAN	CRYBB2 CRYB2 CRYB2A	205
CRBB3_HUMAN	CRYBB3 CRYB3	211
CRBG3_HUMAN	CRYBG3	1022
CRBS_HUMAN	CRYGS CRYG8	178
CRGA_HUMAN	CRYGA CRYG1	174
CRGC_HUMAN	CRYGC CRYG3	174
CRGB_HUMAN	CRYGB CRYG2	175
CRGN_HUMAN	CRYGN	182
CRGD_HUMAN	CRYGD CRYG4	174
CRYAA_HUMAN	CRYAA CRYA1 HSPB4	173
CRYAB_HUMAN	CRYAB CRYA2	175
CRYL1_HUMAN	CRYL1 CRY	319
CRYM_HUMAN	CRYM THBP	314
HSPB2_HUMAN	HSPB2	182
HSPB3_HUMAN	HSPB3 HSP27 HSPL27	150
HSPB8_HUMAN	HSPB8 CRYAC E2IG1 HSP22 PP1629	196
HSPB7_HUMAN	HSPB7 CVHSP	170
HSPB9_HUMAN	HSPB9	159
HSPB1_HUMAN	HSPB1 HSP27 HSP28	205
HSPB6_HUMAN	HSPB6	160
IFT25_HUMAN	HSPB11 C1orf41 IFT25 HSPC034	144
MAF_HUMAN	MAF	373
ODFP1_HUMAN	ODF1 ODFP	250
QORL1_HUMAN	CRYZL1 4P11	349
QOR_HUMAN	CRYZ	329
ZEB1_HUMAN	ZEB1 AREB6 TCF8	1124
Q9UFA7_HUMAN	DKFZp434A0627 CRYGS hCG_16149	120
B4DU04_HUMAN	AIM1 hCG_33516	542
A8KAH6_HUMAN	HSPB2 hCG_39461	182
Q6ICS9_HUMAN	HSPB3 hCG_1736006	150
Q68DG0_HUMAN	DKFZp779D0968 HSPB7	174
Q8N241_HUMAN	HSPB7 hCG_23506	245
B4DLE8_HUMAN	CRYBG3	1365
C3VMY8_HUMAN	CRYAB	175
R4UMM2_HUMAN	CRYBB2	205
B3KQL3_HUMAN		119
Q24JT5_HUMAN	CRYGA	105
V9HWB6_HUMAN	HEL55	160
B4DNC2_HUMAN		196
V9HW27_HUMAN	HEL-S-101	175
H0YCW8_HUMAN	CRYAB	106
E9PHE4_HUMAN	CRYAA	136
E9PNH7_HUMAN	CRYAB	106
E7EWH7_HUMAN	CRYAA	153
B4DL87_HUMAN		170
V9HW43_HUMAN	HEL-S-102	205
E9PR44_HUMAN	CRYAB	174
Q8IVN0_HUMAN		86
B7ZAH2_HUMAN		542
C9J5A3_HUMAN	HSPB7	124
E9PRS4_HUMAN	CRYAB	69
K7EP04_HUMAN	HSPB6	137
I3L3Y1_HUMAN	CRYM	97
H0YG30_HUMAN	HSPB8	152
H9KVC2_HUMAN	CRYM	272
E9PS12_HUMAN	CRYAB	77
E9PIR9_HUMAN	AIM1L	787
B4DUL6_HUMAN		80
I3NI53_HUMAN	CRYM	140
Q9NTH7_HUMAN	DKFZp434L1713	264
J3KQW1_HUMAN	AIM1L	296
Q96QW7_HUMAN	AIM1	316
I3L2W5_HUMAN	CRYM	165
B1AHR5_HUMAN	CRYBB3	113
B4DLI1_HUMAN		403
I3L325_HUMAN	CRYM	241
Q7Z3C1_HUMAN	DKFZp686A14192	191
B4DWM9_HUMAN		154
Q71V83_HUMAN	CRYAA	69
Q6P5P8_HUMAN	AIM1	326
C9JDH2_HUMAN	CRYBA2	129
B4DIA6_HUMAN		155
Q13684_HUMAN		56
F8WE04_HUMAN	HSPB1	186
J3QRT1_HUMAN	CRYBA1	75
E9PRA8_HUMAN	CRYAB	155
E9PJL7_HUMAN	CRYAB	130
C9J5N2_HUMAN	CRYBG3	229
I3L3J9_HUMAN	CRYM	26
C9J659_HUMAN	CRYBG3	131
D3YTC6_HUMAN	HSPB7	165
