= FAM76A =

Protein found in humans

Identifiers
- Aliases: FAM76A, family with sequence similarity 76 member A
- External IDs: MGI: 2385211; GeneCards: FAM76A

Gene location (Human)
Chr.	Chromosome 1 (human)
Band	1p35.3	Start	27,725,961 bp
Band	1p35.3	End	27,763,116 bp

Gene location (Mouse)
Chr.	Chromosome 4 (mouse)
Band	4|4 D2.3	Start	132,626,524 bp
Band	4|4 D2.3	End	132,649,869 bp
RNA expression pattern
Bgee	Human / Mouse (ortholog); Top expressed in: testicle; Achilles tendon; gonad; sural nerve; right testis; left testis; secondary oocyte; right lobe of thyroid gland; right uterine tube; smooth muscle tissue / Top expressed in: iris; sciatic nerve; spermatid; conjunctival fornix; median eminence; ciliary body; Epithelium of choroid plexus; Region I of hippocampus proper; ventromedial nucleus; decidua; More reference expression data
BioGPS	n/a
Gene ontology
Molecular function	endopeptidase activity; SUMO-specific protease activity
Cellular component	nucleoplasm
Biological process	protein desumoylation
Sources:Amigo / QuickGO
Orthologs
Databases	NCBI: entry; OMA: entry
Species	Human	Mouse
Entrez	199870	230789
Ensembl	ENSG00000009780	ENSMUSG00000028878
UniProt	Q8TAV0	Q922G2
RefSeq (mRNA)	NM_152660; NM_001143912; NM_001143913; NM_001143914; NM_001143915	NM_001163792; NM_145553
RefSeq (protein)	NP_001137384; NP_001137385; NP_001137386; NP_001137387; NP_689873	NP_001157264; NP_663528
Location (UCSC)	Chr 1: 27.73 – 27.76 Mb	Chr 4: 132.63 – 132.65 Mb
PubMed search
- Wikidata
View/Edit Human	View/Edit Mouse

FAM76A is a protein that in Homo sapiens is encoded by the FAM76A gene. Notable structural characteristics of FAM76A include an 83 amino acid coiled coil domain as well as a four amino acid poly-serine compositional bias. FAM76A is conserved in most chordates but it is not found in other deuterostome phlya such as echinodermata, hemichordata, or xenacoelomorpha—suggesting that FAM76A arose sometime after chordates in the evolutionary lineage. Furthermore, FAM76A is not found in fungi, plants, archaea, or bacteria. FAM76A is predicted to localize to the nucleus and may play a role in regulating transcription.

== Gene ==
=== Location ===
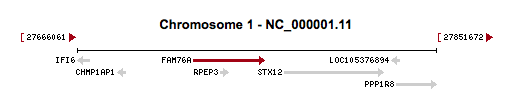
FAM76A gene locus

FAM76A is located on the (+) strand of the short arm of chromosome 1 (1p35.3), with the genomic sequence starting at 27725979 and ending at 27762915. The coding region is made up of 3462 base pairs and is translated into 341 amino acids.

=== Gene neighborhood ===
Genes that flank FAM76A on the telomeric side include IFI6, CHMP1AP1, and RPEP3, while genes that flank FAM76A on the centromeric side include STX12, PPP1R8, and L0C105376894.

=== Common aliases ===
In Caenorhabditis elegans, FAM76A is referred to as K04F10.7. Outside of this, FAM76A does not have any significant alternative names.

== mRNA ==
In Homo sapiens, the FAM76A gene produces 9 different mRNAs, 7 of which are alternatively spliced and 2 of which are unspliced. Of the alternatively spliced mRNAs, isoform 1 is the longest variant of the gene and is the subject of this article.

== Protein ==
=== General properties ===
The molecular weight of FAM76A is 38.4 kDa, making it possible for this protein to diffuse through nuclear pores. The isoelectric point is 9.28. FAM76A does not have any significant positive, negative, or mixed charge clusters. In addition, FAM76A does not have any predicted hydrophobic or transmembrane segments, suggesting that this protein is not found within the cell membrane.

=== Composition ===
The amino acid composition of FAM76A protein showed amino acid frequencies within 1.5% of that of normal human proteins for all but cysteine, valine, and lysine. Cysteine and lysine have higher frequencies compared to a normal Homo sapiens protein, while valine has a lower frequency compared to a normal Homo sapiens protein. These same amino acid frequency differences are seen in FAM76A orthologs such as Gallus gallus (H. sapiens sequence identity 84%), Serinus canaria (H. sapiens sequence identity 77%), and Crassostrea gigas (H. sapiens sequence identity 57%).

=== Domains and motifs ===
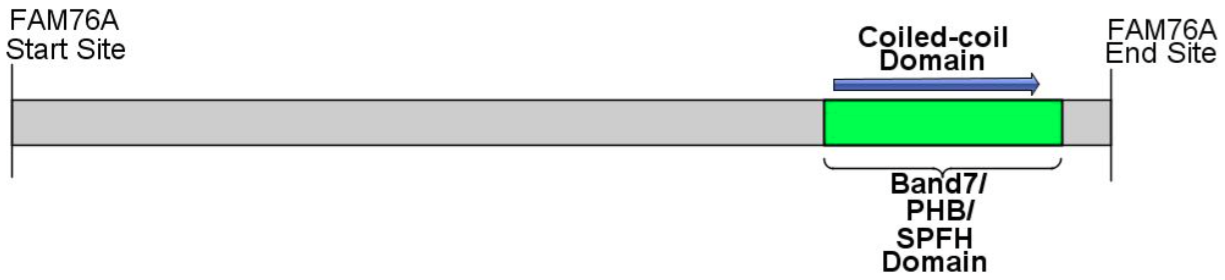
Pictorial representation of FAM76A domains

NCBI conserved domains search identified an uncharacterized conserved protein (YqiK) that contains the Band7/PHB/SPFH domain, whose function is unknown and is conserved in various species ranging from humans to bacteria. In Homo sapiens, the Band7/PHB/SPFH domain spans from amino acids 252–326. The molecular weight of this domain is 8.9 kDa, and it has an isoelectric point of 9.23. The Band7/PHB/SPFH domain does not have any amino acids frequency composition that differs from a normal Homo sapiens protein. This domain is yet to be assigned to any domain superfamily.

=== Secondary structure ===
I-TASSER predicted tertiary structure for FAM76A. This structure has a C-score of -3.27 (measured on a scale of -5 to 2, with higher values equating higher confidence) and a cluster density of .35 (on a scale of 0 to 1, with higher values indicating greater protein prediction coverage). The C-score takes into account both significance of the model's structure and the quality of the prediction coverage from other proteins.

FAM76A is predicted to only have alpha helices. In total, there are 17 alpha helices predicted, the longest of which contains the Band7/PHB/SPFH domain. From this, only 8 alpha helices are located within conserved regions of FAM76A (see conceptual translation).

=== Tertiary/quaternary structure ===
FAM76A contains a coiled-coil domain, which is located within the Band7/PHB/SPFH domain. No significant ligand-binding sites or active sites were predicted from I-TASSER. There is no evidence to suggest that FAM76A interacts with other proteins to form a quaternary structure.

=== Sub-cellular localization ===
The protein subcellular localization prediction tool, PSORT II, predicts FAM76A to be located within the nucleus. This prediction is observed in orthologs such as Gallus gallus and Callorhinchus milii. Further evidence for FAM76A localizing to the nucleus is provided by the presence of a nuclear localization signal.

== Expression ==
According to NCBI Geo Profile, FAM76A is expressed in Homo sapiens parathyroid, lymph node, esophagus, and bone marrow tissue. Developmental stages where FAM76A expression is detected include the embryoid body, fetus, and adult.

=== Brain atlas ===
Allen human brain atlas predictions for FAM76A expression are depicted below. FAM76A appears to have higher expression within the cerebral cortex and lower expression in parts of the reptilian brain such as the pontine tegmentum (see expression table for further details).

Various brain views of FAM76A expression in Homo sapiens—green represents high expression, while red represents low expression

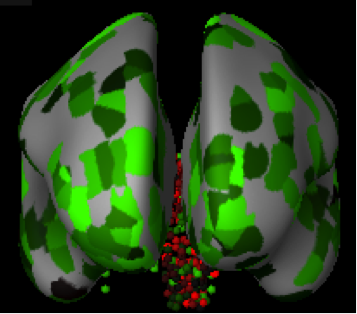
Frontal view

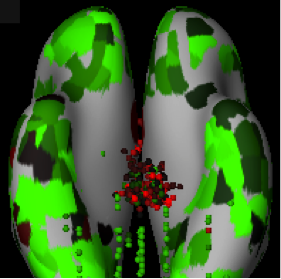
Caudal view

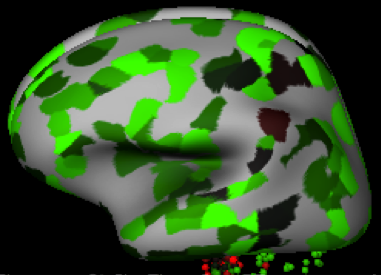
Sagittal view

Expression Table
Brain Area	Function	FAM76A Expression Level
Frontal lobe	Planning, organizing, problem solving, selective attention, personality, and higher cognitive functions	High
Occipital lobe	Visual processing	High
Temporal lobe	Auditory processing	High
Parietal lobe	Sensation, perception, and integration of sensory input	High
Cerebellum	Coordination of voluntary movements	High
Hippocampal formation	Memory/spatial coding	Low
Pontine tegmentum	Sensory and motor function, sleep stage control, and arousal	Low
Myelencephalon cuneate nucleus	Receive fine touch and proprioceptive information from upper body	Low

=== Experimental data ===
Select data from three experiments involving FAM76A are shown below. In one experiment, CLDN1 over-expression in lung adenocarcinoma cells decreased FAM76A expression. In another experiment, androgen insensitive prostate cancer cells were shown to have reduced expression of FAM76A compared to androgen sensitive cells. Another experiment demonstrated that metaphase II oocyte cells were shown to have more expression of FAM76A compared to control cells.

Selected NCBI Geo Data

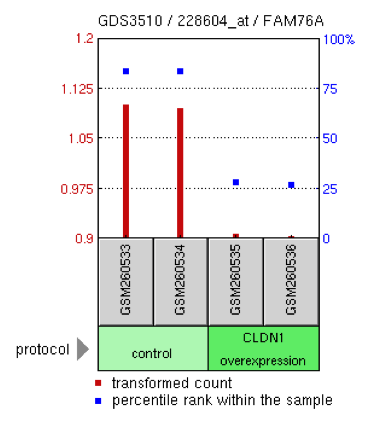
FAM76A levels in H. sapiens lung adenocarcinoma cell lines were compared between cultures that had claudin-1 (CLDN1) overexpression and control cells

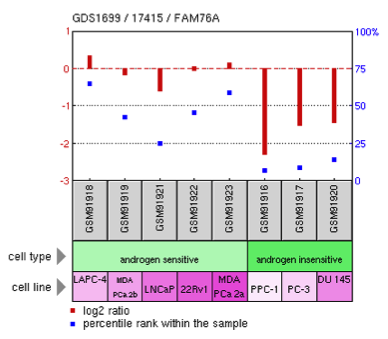
Expression of FAM76A in Homo sapiens androgen sensitive and insensitive prostate cancer cell lines

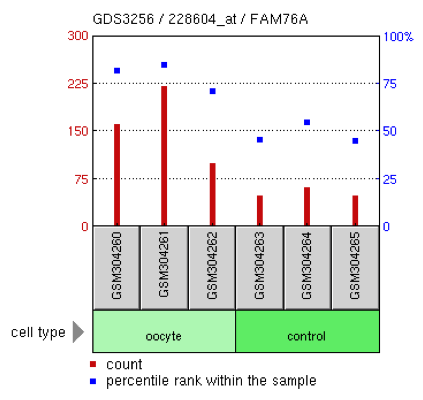
FAM76A expression between H. sapiens metaphase II oocytes and control (consisting of a mixture of skeletal muscle, kidney, lung, colon, liver, spleen, breast, brain, heart, and stomach) cell lines

== Regulation of expression ==
=== Post-translational modifications ===
FAM76A is predicted to undergo a variety of post-translational modifications. Post-translational modifications found within conserved regions include 7 phosphorylation sites, 2 sumoylation sites, and 1 nuclear localization signal. These modifications indicate that FAM76A is localized to the nucleus. Refer to conceptual translation for a visual representation of the aforementioned modifications.

Conceptual translation for FAM76A

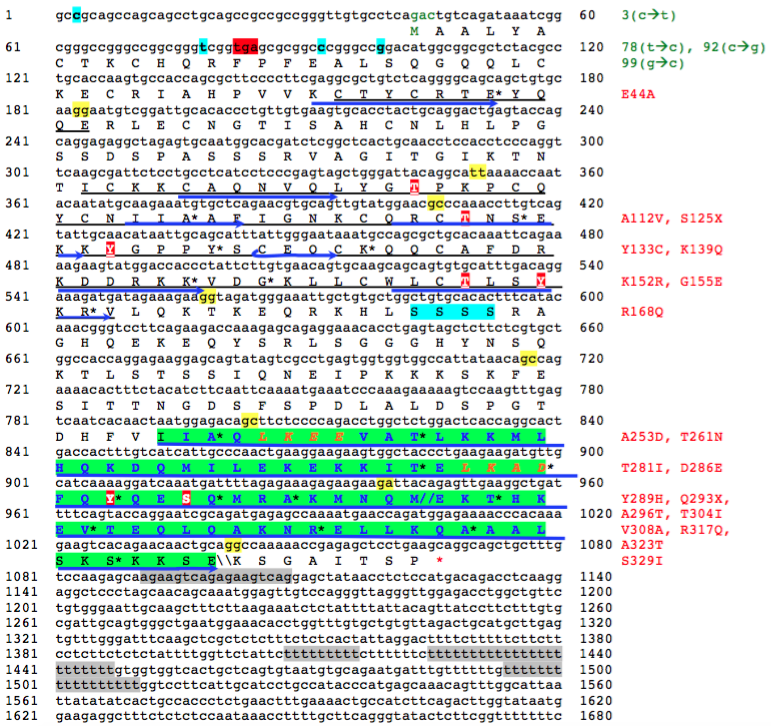

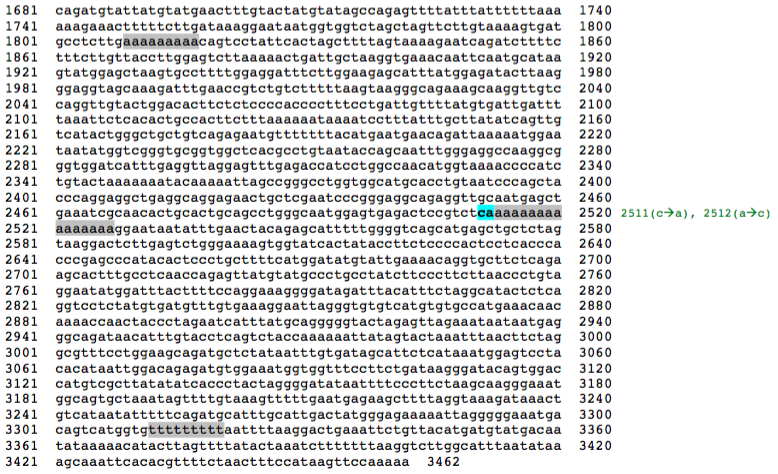

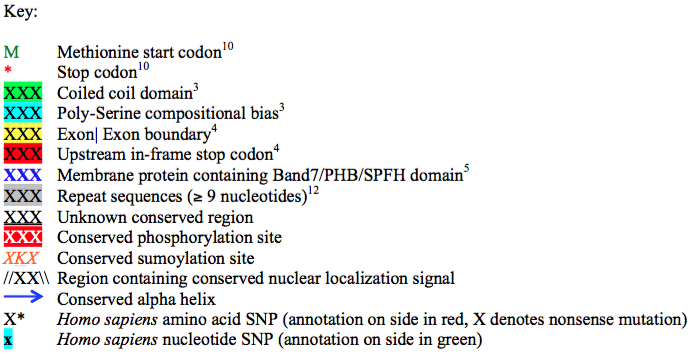
Conceptual translation key

=== Promoter ===
Genomatrix's ElDorado program predicts a promoter for FAM76A that is named GXP_71042 and is 679 base pairs. It is located on chromosome 1, starting at 27725479 and ending at 27726157. GXP_71042 overlaps with the start of the coding sequence of FAM76A. There are several transcription factors that bind to this promoter. Many of the transcription factors that bind to the promoter region of FAM76A have function dealing with blood cells, the immune system, and leukocytes—perhaps suggesting that FAM76A is involved in immune function. It would also appear that the most common matrix families include C2H2 zinc fingers and myeloid zinc fingers, suggesting that these matrix families may be heavily involved in FAM76A transcription.

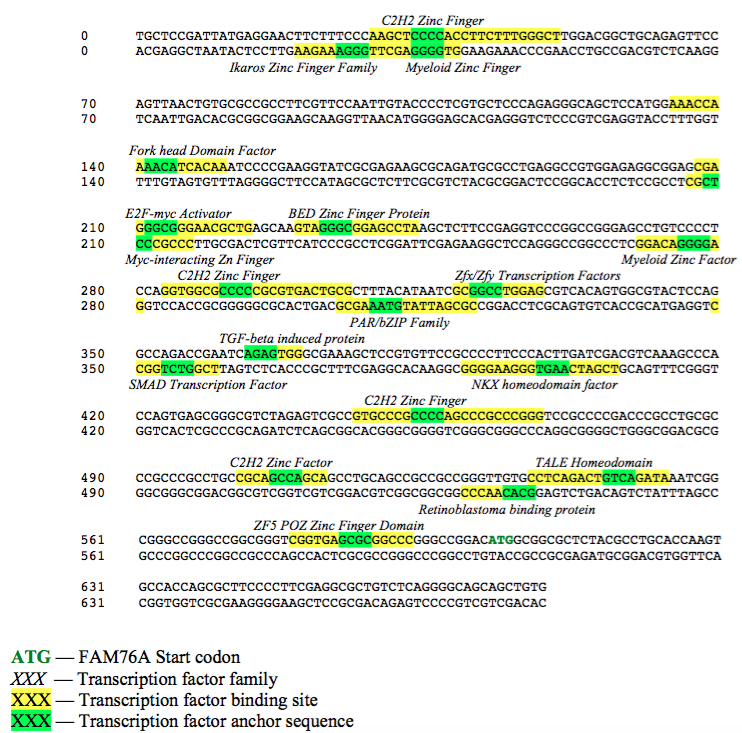
FAM76A Transcription Factor Binding Sites

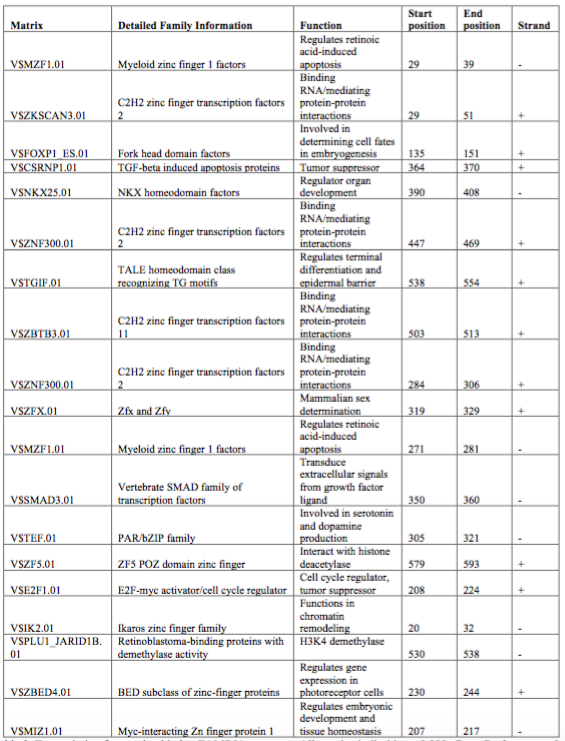
Transcription Factor Binding Site Table

=== RNA binding proteins ===
Common RNA binding proteins within the 3’ UTR of FAM76A include PABPC1, ELAVL1, and PUM2—each with predicted binding frequencies of 32, 18, and 16 times, respectively.

== Interacting proteins ==
FAM76A was found to have a physical interaction with ELAVL1. The interaction was detected by immunoprecipitation by Abdelmohsen et al., 2009. ELAVL1 is involved in regulating gene expression.

== Homology/evolution ==
=== Paralogs ===
FAM76B is a paralog of FAM76A. It is estimated that FAM76A and FAM76B diverged from each other around 17.5 mya. Structural similarities that are conserved between FAM76A/B include a coiled coil domain as well as a poly serine compositional bias. FAM76A and FAM76B both exhibit high expression in tissues such as lymph node, whole blood, testis, ovary, brain, kidney, liver, and lung. FAM76B has about 62% sequence identity with FAM76A.

=== Orthologs ===
Genus and Species	Common Name	Date of Divergence (MYA)	Amino Acid Sequence Identity (%)
Homo sapiens	humans	0	100
Macaca fascicularis	crab-eating macaque	29.1	95
Tarsius syrichta	Philippine tarsier	67.6	85
Dipodomys ordii	Ord's kangaroo rat	90.9	85
Nannospalax galili	blind mole rat	90.9	88
Gallus gallus	red junglefowl	320.5	84
Nipponia nippon	crested ibis	320.5	83
Egretta garzetta	little egret	320.5	75
Anolis carolinensis	Carolina anole	320.5	73
Oryzias latipes	Japanese rice fish	429.6	59
Callorhinchus milii	Australian ghostshark	482.9	64
Crassostrea gigas	pacific oyster	847	57
Cryptosporidium parvum Iowa II	N/A	1724.7	27
Cryptosporidium hominis	N/A	1724.7	26

Shown here is a table of a select number of orthologs for Homo sapiens FAM76A. The table includes closely, intermediately, and distantly related orthologs. Mammals are shown to have greater similarity, while aquatic vertebrates such as actinopterygii/chondrichthyes have lesser similarity. Orthologs of Homo sapiens protein FAM76A are listed above in descending order of date of divergence and then by sequence identity.

=== Evolution ===
FAM76A appears to have a moderate rate of mutation when compared to fibrinogen (fast mutating) and cytochrome c (slow mutating). This suggests that FAM76A has been at least somewhat resistant to mutation during the course of evolution.

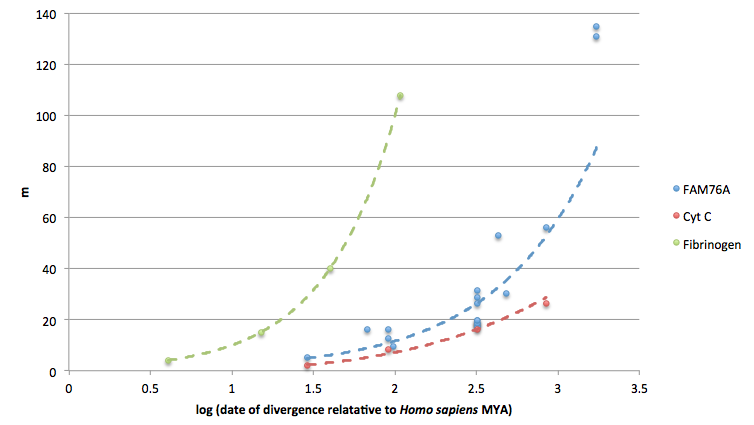
Mutation rate of FAM76A relative to cytochrome C and fibrinogen. Mutation rate, m, which is the corrected percent of amino acid changes between the Homo sapiens protein and its orthologs is plotted against the log (millions of years since the date of divergence of Homo sapiens lineage and the lineage of the species in which the ortholog is seen. Here, "m" is calculated from the observed number of amino acid changes observed between the two organisms as follows: m/100=-ln(1-n/100) where m is the total number of amino acid changes occurred in a 100-amino-acid segment of a protein and n is the observed number of amino acid changes per 100 residues compared to the Homo sapiens protein sequence

== Clinical significance ==
=== Disease association ===
FAM76A expression is highest in adrenal tumors, esophageal tumors, and soft tissue/muscle tissue tumors. Copy number gain/loss of FAM76A—along with neighboring genes—has shown to produce detrimental phenotypes. In one case report, a patient with a copy number gain from 1p36.11-34.2 was shown to have developmental delays. Another patient, who had a copy number gain from 1p36.1-35, showed similar delays. In another case report, a patient with a copy number loss of 1p35.3, the exact location of FAM76A, developed macrocephaly.

== Multiple sequence alignment (MSA) ==
The MSA, shown below and generated with Biology Workbench CLUSTALW, arranges orthologs by the first letter of genus and then the first two letters of species. There are 3 domains that are highly conserved across orthologs. Two of these domains have an unknown function, while the third domain is a coiled-coil domain. Conservation of these regions was traced back to Cryptosporidium parvum Iowa II, which diverged from Homo sapiens 1724.7 MYA. Conserved region 1 contains mostly polar amino acids; conserved region 2 contains both polar and non-polar amino acids; and the coiled-coil domain contains mostly polar amino acids.

Distant Ortholog Multiple Sequence Alignment of FAM76A

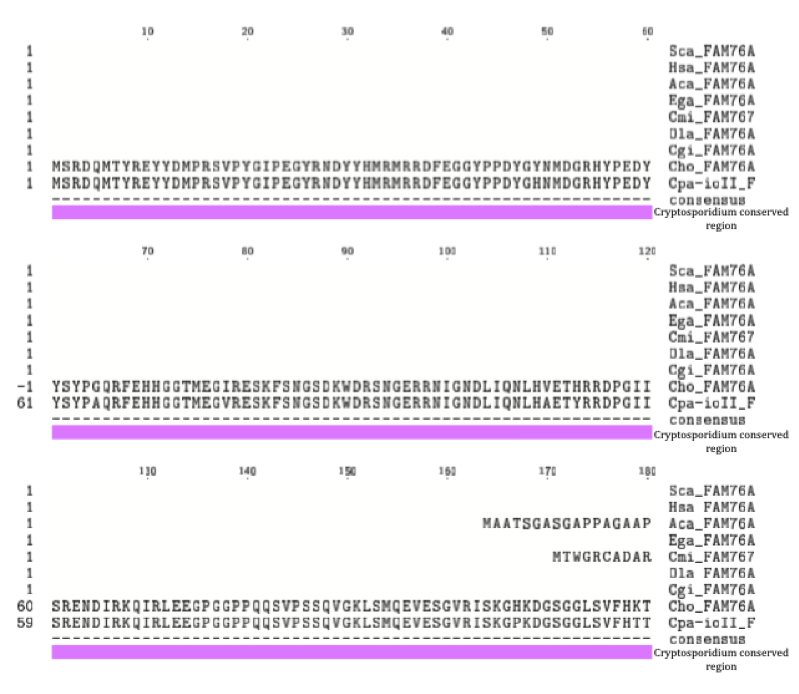

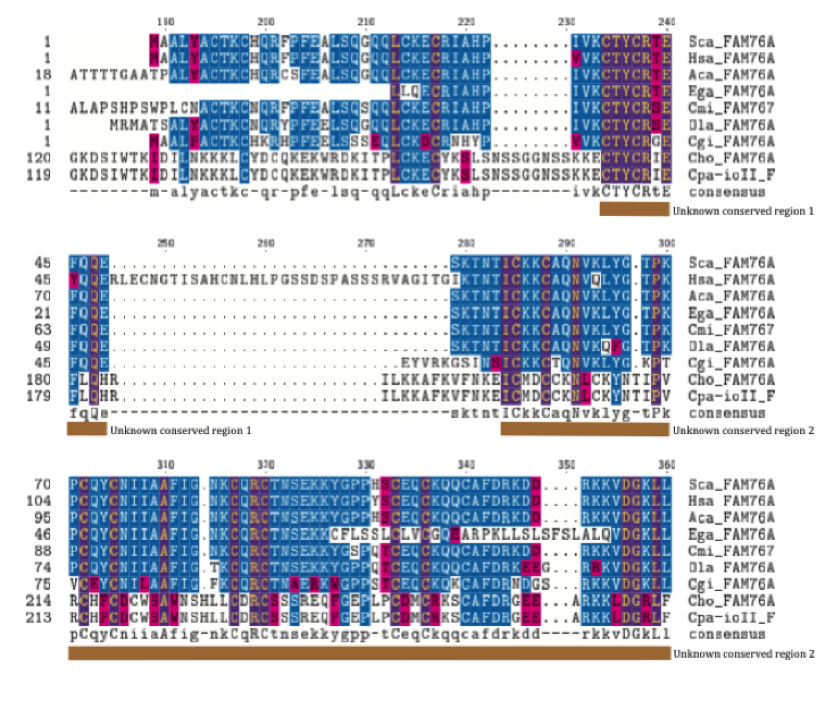
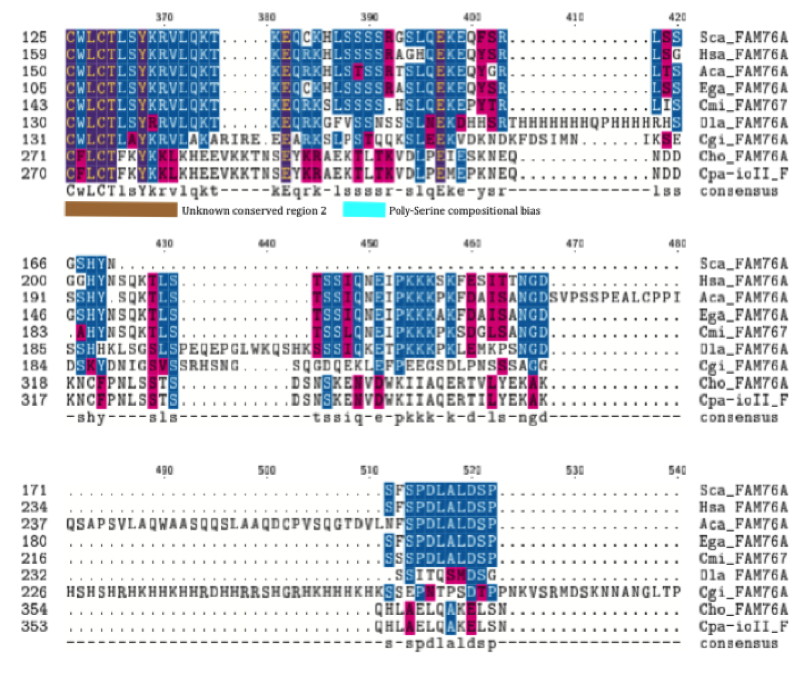
Purple=Similar Amino Acid Chemistry
Blue=Same Amino Acid

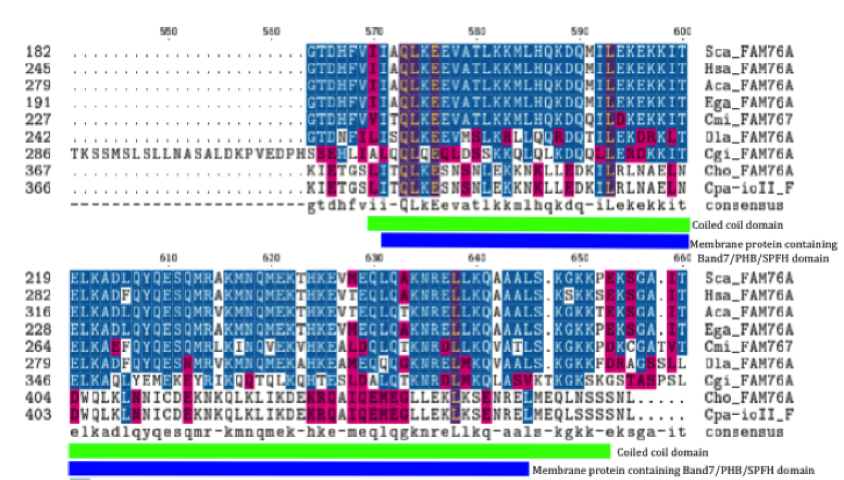
