= HPS6 =

Protein found in humans

Identifiers
- Aliases: HPS6, BLOC2S3, biogenesis of lysosomal organelles complex 2 subunit 3, HPS6 biogenesis of lysosomal organelles complex 2 subunit 3
- External IDs: OMIM: 607522; MGI: 2181763; HomoloGene: 11691; GeneCards: HPS6; OMA:HPS6 - orthologs

Gene location (Human)
Chr.	Chromosome 10 (human)
Band	10q24.32	Start	102,065,349 bp
Band	10q24.32	End	102,068,036 bp

Gene location (Mouse)
Chr.	Chromosome 19 (mouse)
Band	19 C3|19 38.75 cM	Start	45,991,947 bp
Band	19 C3|19 38.75 cM	End	45,994,612 bp
RNA expression pattern
Bgee	Human / Mouse (ortholog); Top expressed in: granulocyte; gingival epithelium; stromal cell of endometrium; mucosa of transverse colon; monocyte; apex of heart; gonad; testicle; pancreatic ductal cell; mucosa of ileum / Top expressed in: primary oocyte; granulocyte; secondary oocyte; right kidney; proximal tubule; morula; muscle of thigh; mesenteric lymph nodes; embryo; epiblast; More reference expression data
BioGPS	n/a
Gene ontology
Molecular function	GTP-dependent protein binding; protein binding
Cellular component	cytoplasm; organelle membrane; BLOC-2 complex; endosome; cytosol; early endosome membrane; endoplasmic reticulum; membrane; intracellular membrane-bounded organelle; lysosome; lysosomal membrane
Biological process	protein localization to membrane; pigmentation; blood coagulation; lysosome localization; organelle organization; melanocyte differentiation
Sources:Amigo / QuickGO
Orthologs
Species	Human	Mouse
Entrez	79803	20170
Ensembl	ENSG00000166189	ENSMUSG00000074811
UniProt	Q86YV9	Q8BLY7
RefSeq (mRNA)	NM_024747	NM_176785
RefSeq (protein)	NP_079023	NP_789742
Location (UCSC)	Chr 10: 102.07 – 102.07 Mb	Chr 19: 45.99 – 45.99 Mb
PubMed search
- Wikidata
View/Edit Human	View/Edit Mouse

Hermansky–Pudlak syndrome 6 (HPS6), also known as ruby-eye protein homolog (Ru), is a protein that in humans is encoded by the HPS6 gene.

== Function ==
This intronless gene encodes a protein that may play a role in organelle biogenesis associated with melanosomes, platelet dense granules, and lysosomes. HPS6 along with HPS3 and HPS5 form a stable protein complex named Biogenesis of Lysosome-related Organelles Complex-2 (BLOC-2).

== Clinical significance ==
Mutations in this gene are associated with Hermansky–Pudlak syndrome type 6 characterized by albinism and prolonged bleeding.
