= C20orf202 =

Identifiers
- Aliases: C20orf202, chromosome 20 open reading frame 202
- External IDs: MGI: 3039588; GeneCards: C20orf202

Gene location (Human)
Chr.	Chromosome 20 (human)
Band	20p13	Start	1,203,454 bp
Band	20p13	End	1,209,076 bp

Gene location (Mouse)
Chr.	Chromosome 2 (mouse)
Band	2|2 G3	Start	151,521,281 bp
Band	2|2 G3	End	151,528,259 bp
RNA expression pattern
Bgee	Human / Mouse (ortholog); Top expressed in: testicle; placenta; right lung; apex of heart; gallbladder; upper lobe of left lung; islet of Langerhans; cerebellum; cerebellar hemisphere; right hemisphere of cerebellum / Top expressed in: olfactory bulb; cerebellum; embryo; cerebellar cortex; Cortex of frontal lobe; primary visual cortex; superior frontal gyrus; hypothalamus; zygote; hippocampal formation; More reference expression data
BioGPS	n/a
Orthologs
Databases	NCBI: entry; OMA: entry
Species	Human	Mouse
Entrez	400831	228767
Ensembl	ENSG00000215595	ENSMUSG00000087035
UniProt	A1L168	n/a
RefSeq (mRNA)	NM_001394958	NM_001378411
RefSeq (protein)	NP_001009612	n/a
Location (UCSC)	Chr 20: 1.2 – 1.21 Mb	Chr 2: 151.52 – 151.53 Mb
PubMed search
- Wikidata
View/Edit Human	View/Edit Mouse

C20orf202 (chromosome 20 open reading frame 202) is a protein that in humans is encoded by the C20orf202 gene. In humans, this gene encodes for a nuclear protein that is primarily expressed in the lung and placenta.

== Gene ==
C20orf202 is located on the plus strand of chromosome 20 at 20p13. The gene is 4,826 base pairs long. It spans from chr20:1,184,098-1,188,918, and contains 2 exons.

== Transcript ==
There is one transcript of C20orf202. The mRNA sequence is 1,609 base pairs long.

== Protein ==
The protein encoded by C20orf202 is 122 amino acids in length with a predicted molecular mass of 13591 Da and a predicted isoelectric point of 9.13 pl/MW. C20orf202 contains PFAM domain DUF3461 at amino acids 3-67. This domain codes for a protein of unknown function. The structure of C20orf202 consists of 46.72% random coils, 42.62% alpha helixes, and 10.66% extended strands.

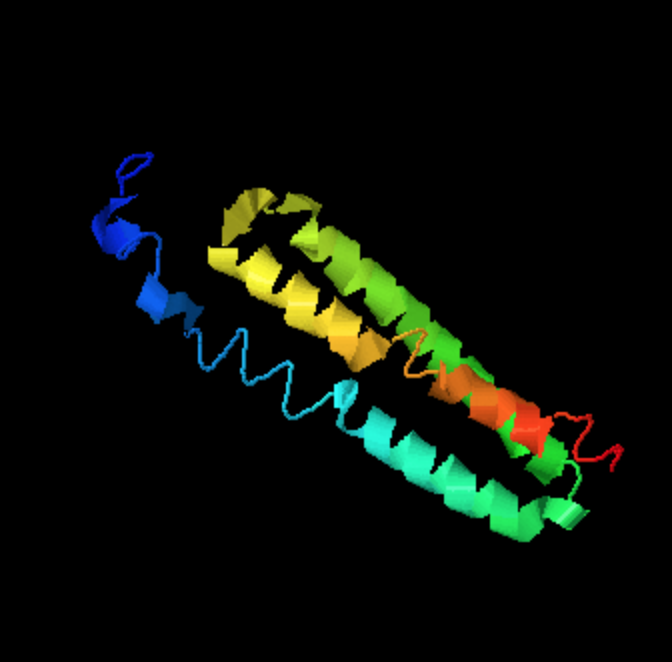
C20orf202 quaternary structure

== Regulation ==
=== Gene-level regulation ===
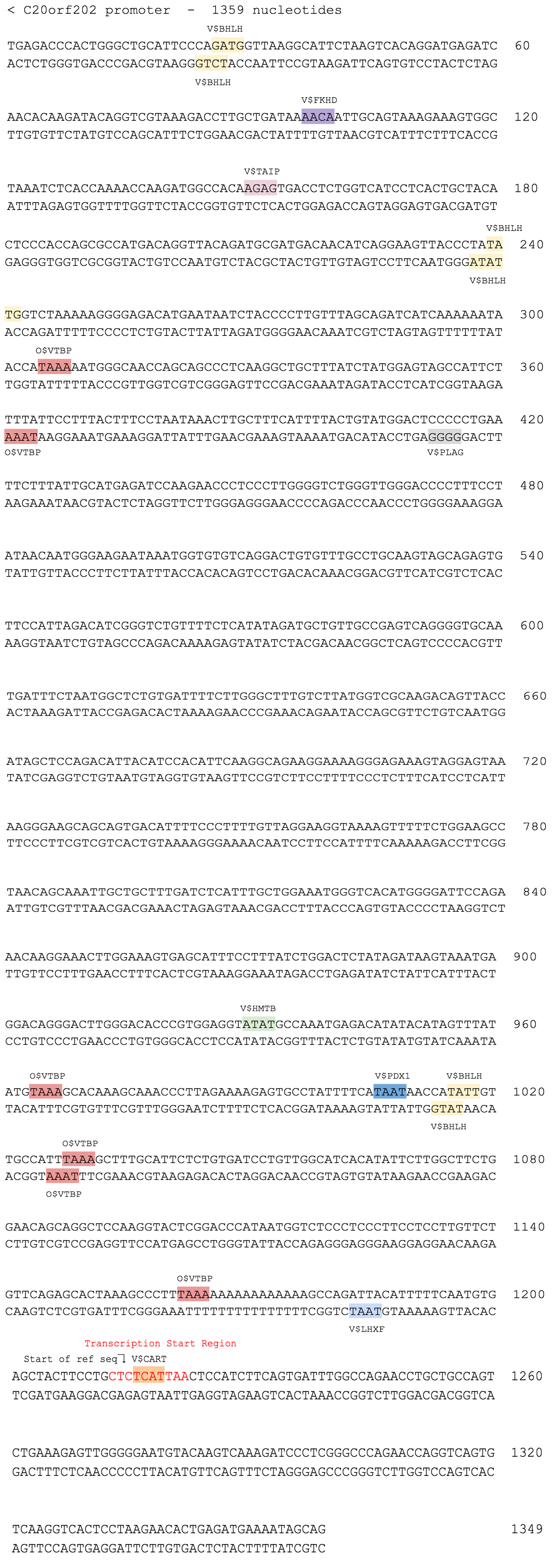
C20orf202 transcription binding factor sites in the promoter

The C20orf202 promoter has many transcription factor binding sites, most notably at the beginning and end of the promoter. These sites are shown in the figure to the right and are listed below with their respective functions.

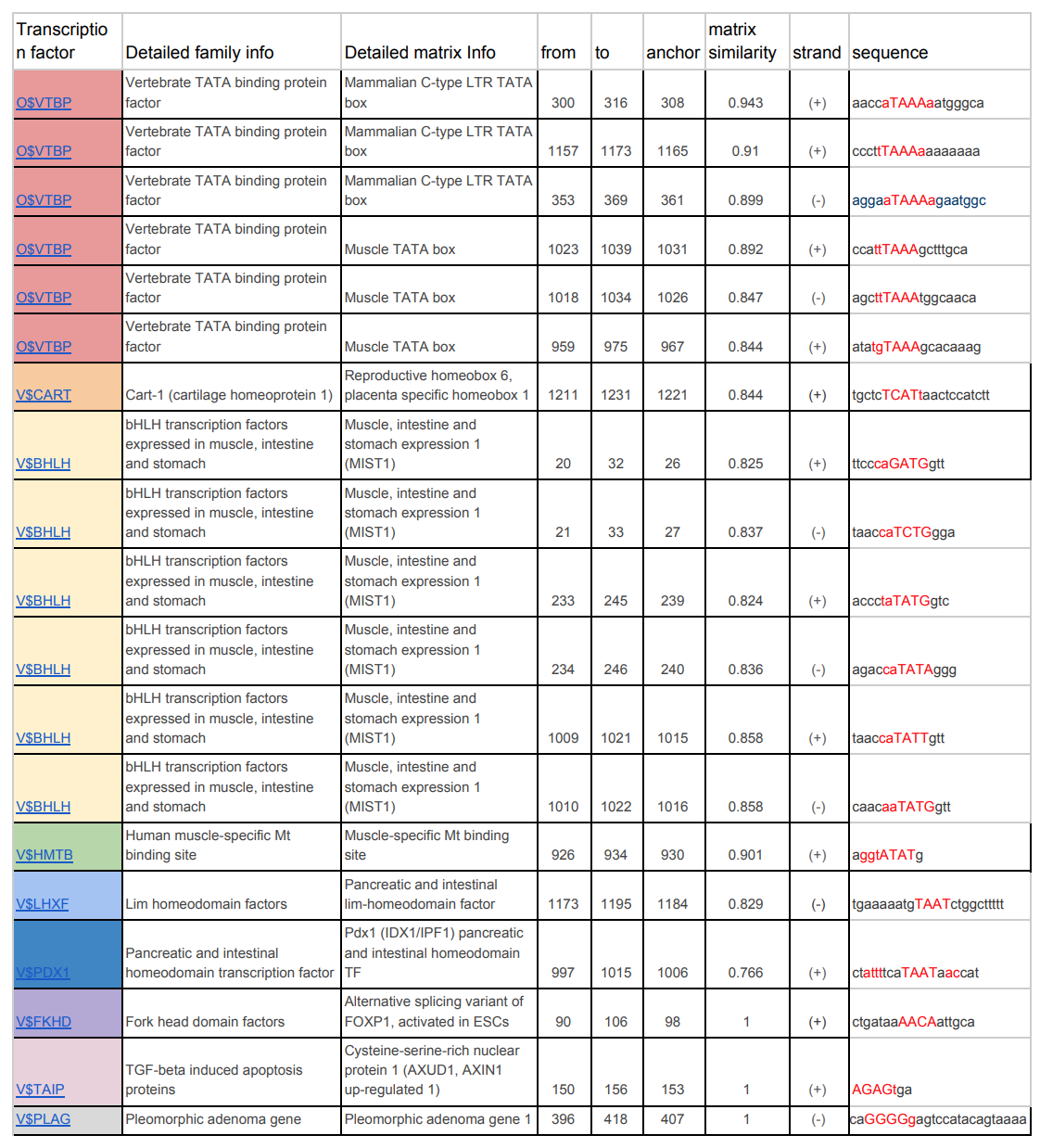
C20orf202 transcription binding factor sites

=== Transcript-level regulation ===
MicroRNA binding sites are only found in the 3' UTR of C20orf202. Most of these sites are found in the beginning or end of the 3' UTR, with many located in close proximity to each other. These 3' UTR microRNA binding sites can be seen in the figure to the right.

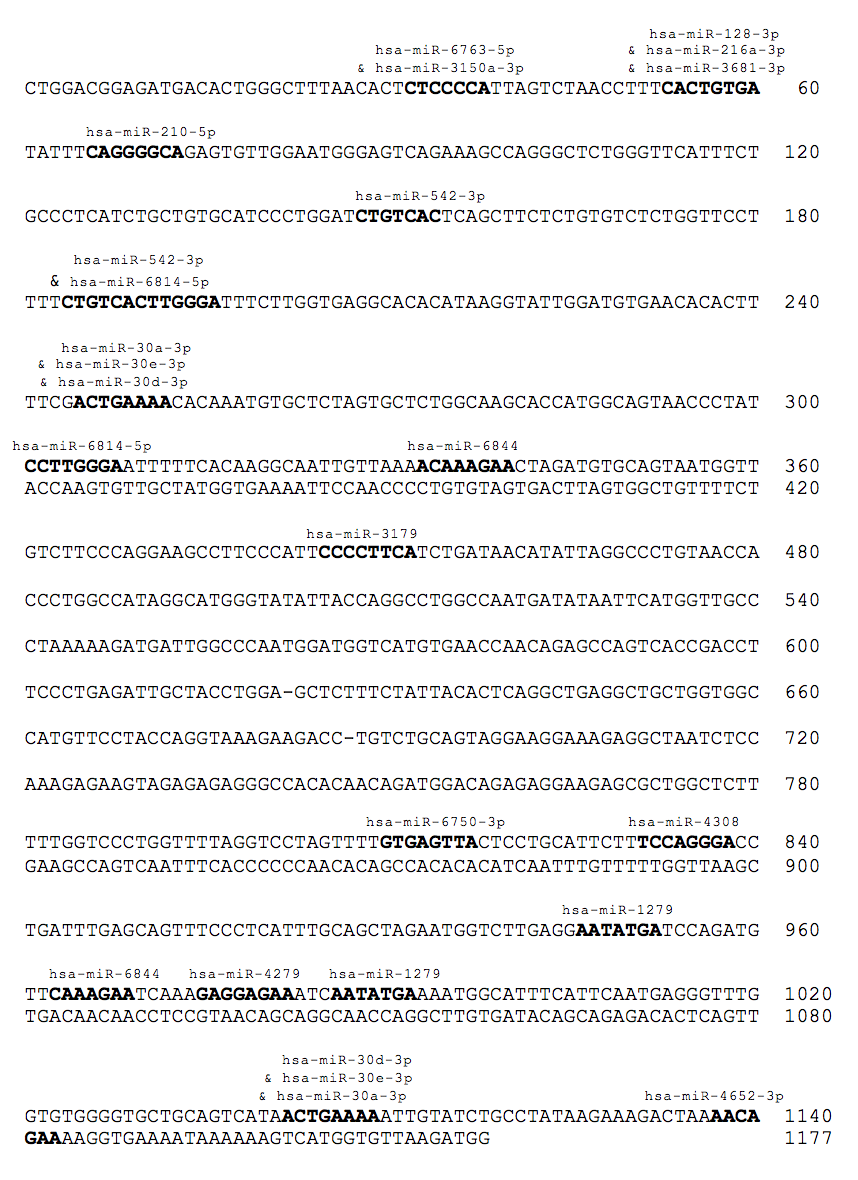
C20orf202 3' UTR microRNA binding sites

=== Protein-level regulation ===
C20orf202 has many phosphorylation and glycosylation sites throughout the protein. A few of the phosphorylation sites are located in highly conserved regions of the protein.

== Expression ==
In humans, C20orf202 has moderate mRNA abundance across cell types, though higher than average expression in the kidney and heart, it is not significantly so. Additionally C20orf202 expression increases during fetal development of kidney, lung, and intestinal tissues.

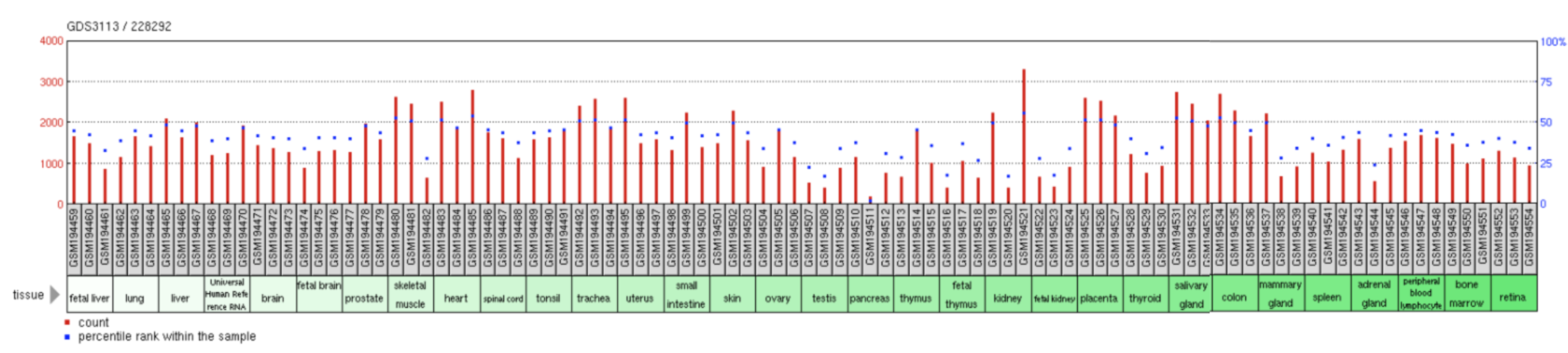
C20orf202 expression profile via NCBI GEO GDS3113. The graph shows expression levels of C20orf202 within various normal tissues within humans. The most notable higher expression levels are in the kidney and the heart, however not significantly so. Red bars indicate the absolute expression levels and blue dots are the percentile rank of gene expression within the sample.

== Homology ==
=== Paralogs ===
C20orf202 has three known paralogs- FAM167a, FAM167b, and AARD.

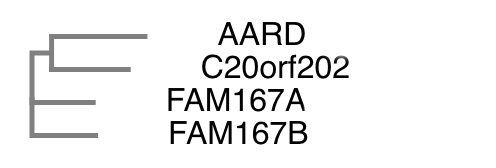
C20orf202 paralog phylogeny

=== Orthologs ===
C20orf202 orthologs can be found in major groups such as mammals, reptiles, amphibians, and distantly fish.

This table lists several orthologs for C20orf202 including genus and species, common name, taxonomic group, evolutionary date of divergence, accession number, sequence length, sequence identity, and sequence similarity.

C20orf202 orthologs
Genus and species	Common name	Taxonomic group	Estimated date of divergence	Accession number	Length (amino acids)	Sequence identity	Sequence similarity
Homo sapiens	Human	Mammalia (Primata)	0	NP_001009612.1	122	100%	100%
Pan troglodytes	Chimpanzee	Mammalia (Primata)	6.7	XP_001167776.1	122	99%	99%
Dipodomys ordii	Ord's kangaroo rat	Mammalia (Rodentia)	90	XP_012866108.1	151	74%	87%
Peromyscus maniculatus	Deer mouse	Mammalia (Rodentia)	90	XP_006985608.1	192	68%	81%
Fukomys damarensis	Damaraland mole-rat	Mammalia (Rodentia)	90	XP_010611217.1	131	67%	77%
Grammomys surdaster	African woodland thicket rat	Mammalia (Rodentia)	90	XP_028630806.1	190	60%	71%
Sus scrofa	Wild boar	Mammalia (Artiodactyla)	96	XP_013840663.1	123	84%	90%
Monodon monoceros	Narwhal	Mammalia (Artiodactyla)	96	XP_029077716.1	153	79%	90%
Delphinapterus leucas	Beluga whale	Mammalia (Artiodactyla)	96	XP_022448507.1	153	79%	90%
Orcinus orca	Orca	Mammalia (Artiodactyla)	96	XP_004273009.1	136	78%	90%
Eptesicus fuscus	Big brown bat	Mammalia (Chiroptera)	96	XP_028000906.1	179	79%	88%
Vulpes vulpes	Red fox	Mammalia (Carnivora)	96	XP_025841919.1	163	79%	88%
Canis lupus familiaris	Dog	Mammalia (Carnivora)	96	XP_022265199.1	125	77%	87%
Lacerta agilis	Sand lizard	Reptilia (Squamata)	312	XP_033006940.1	95	47%	64%
Podarcis muralis	Common wall lizard	Reptilia (Squamata)	312	XP_028591365.1	95	45%	58%
Chelonoidis abingdonii	Pinta Island tortoise	Reptilia (Testudines)	312	XP_032622241.1	98	46%	61%
Alligator sinensis	Chinese alligator	Reptilia (Crocodilia)	312	XP_006030613.1	98	42%	59%
Nanorana parkeri	High Himalaya frog	Amphibia (Anura)	351.8	XP_018411922.1	114	44%	58%
Cyprinodon variegatus	Sheepshead minnow	Actinopterygii (Cyprinodontiformes)	435	XP_015232405.1	146	54%	72%
Cyprinus carpio	Common carp	Actinopterygii (Cyprinodontiformes)	435	KTF83963.1	190	47%	68%

== Interacting proteins ==
Two hybrid prey pooling followed by two hybrid array revealed that C20orf202 is predicted to interact with two other proteins: SNAPAP and HNRNPCL1. SNAPAP (SNARE-associated protein) has a role in the SNARE binding complex, and is also associated with Hermansky–Pudlak syndrome and tricuspid valve stenosis. HNRNPCL1 (Heterogeneous Nuclear Ribonucleoprotein C Like 1) has a role in RNA binding and nucleosome assembly.

== Clinical significance ==
C20orf202 has been associated by GWAS to multiple sclerosis. Additionally, through in silico analysis, C20orf202 was identified as being involved in chromosome 20p inv dup del syndrome, a syndrome similar to trisomy 20p.
