= BLOC-1 subunit 4 =

Protein found in humans

BLOC1S4

Identifiers
- Aliases: BLOC1S4, BCAS4L, BLOS4, CNO, biogenesis of lysosomal organelles complex 1 subunit 4
- External IDs: OMIM: 605695; MGI: 1929230; GeneCards: BLOC1S4

Gene location (Human)
Chr.	Chromosome 4 (human)
Band	4p16.1	Start	6,716,174 bp
Band	4p16.1	End	6,717,664 bp

Gene location (Mouse)
Chr.	Chromosome 5 (mouse)
Band	5|5 B3	Start	36,904,722 bp
Band	5|5 B3	End	36,905,994 bp
RNA expression pattern
Bgee	Human / Mouse (ortholog); Top expressed in: mucosa of ileum; granulocyte; gonad; olfactory zone of nasal mucosa; mucosa of transverse colon; monocyte; cartilage tissue; left adrenal gland; left adrenal cortex; right adrenal gland / Top expressed in: fossa; ciliary body; retinal pigment epithelium; condyle; conjunctival fornix; interventricular septum; iris; Epithelium of choroid plexus; epithelium of lens; facial motor nucleus; More reference expression data
BioGPS	n/a
Gene ontology
Molecular function	protein binding
Cellular component	cytoplasm; cytosol; BLOC-1 complex; axon cytoplasm
Biological process	anterograde axonal transport; melanosome organization; intracellular transport; anterograde synaptic vesicle transport; neuron projection development; platelet aggregation; neuromuscular process controlling balance
Sources:Amigo / QuickGO
Orthologs
Databases	NCBI: entry; OMA: entry
Species	Human	Mouse
Entrez	55330	117197
Ensembl	ENSG00000186222	ENSMUSG00000060708
UniProt	Q9NUP1	Q8VED2
RefSeq (mRNA)	NM_018366	NM_133724
RefSeq (protein)	NP_060836	NP_598485
Location (UCSC)	Chr 4: 6.72 – 6.72 Mb	Chr 5: 36.9 – 36.91 Mb
PubMed search
- Wikidata
View/Edit Human	View/Edit Mouse

BLOC-1 subunit 4, also called Cappuccino homolog (CNO) is a protein that in humans is encoded by the BLOC1S4 gene. This protein is a subunit of BLOC-1 (biogenesis of lysosome-related organelles complex 1), which is involved in the biogenesis of certain organelles like melanosomes and dense granules.

This intronless gene encodes a protein that may play a role in organelle biogenesis associated with melanosomes, platelet dense granules, and lysosomes. A similar protein in mouse is a component of a protein complex termed biogenesis of lysosome-related organelles complex 1 (BLOC-1), and is a model for Hermansky–Pudlak syndrome. The encoded protein may play a role in intracellular vesicular trafficking.

== Interactions ==
BLOC1S4 has been shown to interact with BLOC1S2 and BLOC1S6.
