= Biogenesis of lysosome-related organelles complex 3 =

BLOC-3 or biogenesis of lysosome-related organelles complex 3 is a ubiquitously expressed multisubunit protein complex.

== Interactions ==
Biogenesis of lysosome-related organelles complex 3 has been shown to interact with RAB9A.

== Complex Components ==
The identified protein subunits of BLOC-3 include:

- HPS1,
- HPS4
