= BLOC-1 subunit 5 =

Protein-coding gene in the species Homo sapiens

BLOC1S5

Identifiers
- Aliases: BLOC1S5, BLOS5, MU, MUTED, biogenesis of lysosomal organelles complex 1 subunit 5, HPS11
- External IDs: OMIM: 607289; MGI: 2178598; GeneCards: BLOC1S5

Gene location (Human)
Chr.	Chromosome 6 (human)
Band	6p24.3	Start	8,013,567 bp
Band	6p24.3	End	8,064,396 bp

Gene location (Mouse)
Chr.	Chromosome 13 (mouse)
Band	13 A3.3|13 18.35 cM	Start	38,776,818 bp
Band	13 A3.3|13 18.35 cM	End	38,819,085 bp
RNA expression pattern
Bgee	Human / Mouse (ortholog); Top expressed in: pancreatic ductal cell; visceral pleura; parietal pleura; tibia; tendon of biceps brachii; endothelial cell; germinal epithelium; sperm; superficial temporal artery; trabecular bone / Top expressed in: epithelium of lens; motor neuron; endocardial cushion; left lobe of liver; facial motor nucleus; substantia nigra; atrioventricular junction; renal corpuscle; medial vestibular nucleus; atrioventricular valve; More reference expression data
BioGPS	n/a
Gene ontology
Molecular function	protein binding
Cellular component	BLOC-1 complex; transport vesicle; axon cytoplasm
Biological process	melanosome transport; neuron projection development; anterograde synaptic vesicle transport; endosome to melanosome transport; anterograde axonal transport; melanosome organization; positive regulation of pigment cell differentiation
Sources:Amigo / QuickGO
Orthologs
Databases	NCBI: entry; OMA: entry
Species	Human	Mouse
Entrez	63915	17828
Ensembl	ENSG00000188428	ENSMUSG00000038982
UniProt	Q8TDH9	Q8R015
RefSeq (mRNA)	NM_201280; NM_001199322; NM_001199323	NM_139063; NM_178054
RefSeq (protein)	NP_001186251; NP_001186252; NP_958437	NP_620702
Location (UCSC)	Chr 6: 8.01 – 8.06 Mb	Chr 13: 38.78 – 38.82 Mb
PubMed search
- Wikidata
View/Edit Human	View/Edit Mouse

BLOC-1 subunit 5 is a protein that in humans is encoded by the BLOC1S5 gene (previously MUTED). This protein is part of the Biogenesis of lysosomal organelles complex 1 (BLOC-1) which, as its name suggests, is involved in biogenesis of lysosome-related organelles (LROs) such as melanosomes and dense granules in platelets.

== Function ==
This gene encodes a component of BLOC-1 (biogenesis of lysosome-related organelles complex 1). Components of this complex are involved in the biogenesis of organelles such as melanosomes and platelet-dense granules. A mouse model for Hermansky–Pudlak syndrome is mutated in the murine version of this gene. Some transcripts of the downstream gene TXNDC5 overlap this gene, but they do not contain an open reading frame for this gene.

== Interactions ==
MUTED has been shown to interact with BLOC1S2, Dysbindin and PLDN.
