= Dysbindin =

Protein

DTNBP1

Identifiers
- Aliases: DTNBP1, BLOC1S8, DBND, HPS7, My031, SDY, dystrobrevin binding protein 1
- External IDs: OMIM: 607145; MGI: 2137586; HomoloGene: 12037; GeneCards: DTNBP1; OMA:DTNBP1 - orthologs

Gene location (Human)
Chr.	Chromosome 6 (human)
Band	6p22.3	Start	15,522,807 bp
Band	6p22.3	End	15,663,058 bp

Gene location (Mouse)
Chr.	Chromosome 13 (mouse)
Band	13 A5|13 21.73 cM	Start	45,075,551 bp
Band	13 A5|13 21.73 cM	End	45,155,623 bp
RNA expression pattern
Bgee	Human / Mouse (ortholog); Top expressed in: tendon of biceps brachii; nucleus accumbens; putamen; internal globus pallidus; caudate nucleus; hypothalamus; amygdala; cingulate gyrus; anterior cingulate cortex; substantia nigra / Top expressed in: interventricular septum; right kidney; spermatocyte; yolk sac; superior frontal gyrus; dentate gyrus of hippocampal formation granule cell; brown adipose tissue; muscle of thigh; visual cortex; primary visual cortex; More reference expression data
BioGPS	n/a
Gene ontology
Molecular function	protein binding
Cellular component	cytoplasm; cytosol; endosome; postsynaptic membrane; endoplasmic reticulum membrane; membrane; postsynaptic density; growth cone; BLOC-1 complex; plasma membrane; dendritic spine; synapse; synaptic vesicle membrane; melanosome membrane; axon; cell junction; endoplasmic reticulum; sarcoplasm; neuron projection; sarcolemma; endosome membrane; cytoplasmic vesicle membrane; cytoplasmic vesicle; nucleus; axon cytoplasm; microtubule cytoskeleton; midbody; asymmetric synapse; Schaffer collateral - CA1 synapse; hippocampal mossy fiber to CA3 synapse; glutamatergic synapse
Biological process	actin cytoskeleton reorganization; regulation of dopamine secretion; neuron projection morphogenesis; platelet dense granule organization; response to stimulus; regulation of dopamine receptor signaling pathway; positive regulation of neurotransmitter secretion; blood coagulation; organelle organization; anterograde axonal transport; melanosome organization; positive regulation of gene expression; anterograde synaptic vesicle transport; neuron projection development; regulation of JUN kinase activity; negative regulation of protein serine/threonine kinase activity; dendrite morphogenesis; negative regulation of protein binding; regulation of synaptic vesicle exocytosis
Sources:Amigo / QuickGO
Orthologs
Species	Human	Mouse
Entrez	84062	94245
Ensembl	ENSG00000047579	ENSMUSG00000057531
UniProt	Q96EV8	Q91WZ8
RefSeq (mRNA)	NM_001271667; NM_001271668; NM_001271669; NM_032122; NM_183040	NM_025772
RefSeq (protein)	NP_001258596; NP_001258597; NP_001258598; NP_115498; NP_898861	NP_080048
Location (UCSC)	Chr 6: 15.52 – 15.66 Mb	Chr 13: 45.08 – 45.16 Mb
PubMed search
- Wikidata
View/Edit Human	View/Edit Mouse

Dysbindin, short for dystrobrevin-binding protein 1, is a protein constituent of the dystrophin-associated protein complex (DPC) of skeletal muscle cells. It is also a part of BLOC-1, or biogenesis of lysosome-related organelles complex 1.In humans, dysbindin is encoded by the DTNBP1 gene.

== Discovery ==
Dysbindin was discovered by the research group of Derek Blake via yeast two-hybrid screening for binding partners of α-dystrobrevin.

== Tissue distribution ==
Dysbindin is found in neural tissue of the brain, particularly in axon bundles and especially in certain axon terminals, notably mossy fiber synaptic terminals in the cerebellum and hippocampus.

== Structure ==
Dysbindin is a coiled-coil-containing protein that serves as a core, stable component of the biogenesis of lysosome-related organelles complex 1 (BLOC-1), a multisubunit complex involved in intracellular protein trafficking and synaptic function. Structurally, dysbindin engages in direct interactions with other BLOC-1 subunits—pallidin, snapin, and muted—primarily through a 69-residue region that forms coiled-coil domains, which are critical for complex assembly and stability. Dysbindin’s sequence does not share significant identity with proteins of known function outside BLOC-1, but its acidic C-terminal region is homologous to domains found in other regulatory proteins, suggesting a role in recruiting or scaffolding additional protein partners (PMID 16533041). Within neurons, dysbindin and its BLOC-1 partners localize to endosomal and synaptic compartments, where they regulate the trafficking of synaptic vesicle proteins and surface expression of neurotransmitter receptors, processes fundamental to synaptic plasticity and neurotransmission.

== Function ==
Dysbindin is a multifunctional regulatory protein highly expressed in the brain, where it plays a critical role in synaptic function, neurotransmitter release, and cognitive processes. As a core component of the biogenesis of lysosome-related organelles complex 1 (BLOC-1), dysbindin is essential for the trafficking of synaptic vesicle proteins and the regulation of receptor surface expression, particularly dopamine D2 receptors in cortical neurons. Reduced dysbindin expression leads to increased surface D2 receptor levels and altered excitability of prefrontal cortical microcircuits, effects that have been linked to cognitive deficits and the pathophysiology of schizophrenia. Additionally, dysbindin is involved in the regulation of glutamatergic and GABAergic neurotransmission, synapse formation, and maintenance, further underscoring its importance in neurodevelopment and synaptic plasticity.

In drosophila, dysbindin has been shown to be essential for neural plasticity.

== Clinical significance ==
Interest in dysbindin has grown from pedigree-based family association studies of schizophrenia, which found a strong correlation between a particular dysbindin allele and the clinical manifestation of the disease. However, this genetic link has not been consistently replicated across all case-control samples, suggesting that different genetic subtypes of schizophrenia, with varying disease allele frequencies, exist in different populations. This phenomenon, known as genetic locus heterogeneity, is common among complex disorders with strong genetic components. Compounding this complexity, it is likely that multiple distinct mutations within the dysbindin gene contribute to schizophrenia. This situation, known as disease allele heterogeneity, helps explain why different markers in the dysbindin gene show associations in different study populations.

Although the precise mechanisms by which dysbindin contributes to brain dysfunction are not fully understood, evidence suggests functional consequences. One study reported that schizophrenia patients carrying a high-risk dysbindin haplotype exhibited deficits in visual processing. Another study demonstrated that reduced expression of DTNBP1 led to increased cell surface levels of dopamine D2 receptors, implicating dysbindin in dopaminergic signaling regulation.

In addition to its role in schizophrenia, mutations in the DTNBP1 gene have been shown to cause Hermansky–Pudlak syndrome type 7.

== Interactions ==
Dysbindin has been shown to interact with SNAPAP, MUTED and PLDN.
