= BLOC-1 subunit 3 =

Protein found in humans

BLOC1S3

Identifiers
- Aliases: BLOC1S3, BLOS3, HPS8, RP, biogenesis of lysosomal organelles complex 1 subunit 3
- External IDs: OMIM: 609762; MGI: 2678952; GeneCards: BLOC1S3

Gene location (Human)
Chr.	Chromosome 19 (human)
Band	19q13.32	Start	45,178,784 bp
Band	19q13.32	End	45,216,933 bp

Gene location (Mouse)
Chr.	Chromosome 7 (mouse)
Band	7 A3|7 9.92 cM	Start	19,238,411 bp
Band	7 A3|7 9.92 cM	End	19,242,292 bp
RNA expression pattern
Bgee	Human / Mouse (ortholog); Top expressed in: oocyte; secondary oocyte; skin of arm; granulocyte; gonad; testicle; blood; skin of leg; mucosa of ileum; skin of abdomen / Top expressed in: granulocyte; lumbar spinal ganglion; ventral tegmental area; intestinal villus; central gray substance of midbrain; carotid body; decidua; pontine nuclei; fetal liver hematopoietic progenitor cell; ganglionic eminence; More reference expression data
BioGPS	n/a
Gene ontology
Molecular function	protein binding; molecular function; protein transmembrane transporter activity
Cellular component	cytoplasm; transport vesicle; axon cytoplasm; cytosol; BLOC-1 complex
Biological process	eye development; platelet activation; melanosome transport; endosome to melanosome transport; neuron projection development; melanosome organization; pigmentation; platelet dense granule organization; anterograde axonal transport; anterograde synaptic vesicle transport; blood coagulation; positive regulation of natural killer cell activation; secretion of lysosomal enzymes; developmental pigmentation; protein transmembrane transport
Sources:Amigo / QuickGO
Orthologs
Databases	NCBI: entry; OMA: entry
Species	Human	Mouse
Entrez	388552	232946
Ensembl	ENSG00000189114	ENSMUSG00000057667
UniProt	Q6QNY0	Q5U5M8
RefSeq (mRNA)	NM_212550	NM_177692
RefSeq (protein)	NP_997715	NP_808360
Location (UCSC)	Chr 19: 45.18 – 45.22 Mb	Chr 7: 19.24 – 19.24 Mb
PubMed search
- Wikidata
View/Edit Human	View/Edit Mouse

BLOC-1 subunit 3 is a protein that in humans is encoded by the BLOC1S3 gene. This protein is a component of BLOC-1 (Biogenesis of lysosome-related organelles complex), which is involved in the biogenesis of certain organelles like melanosomes and dense granules in platelets. Also called HPS8, mutations in the gene BLOC1S3 are associated with type 8 Hermansky–Pudlak syndrome.
