= RABEPK =

Protein-coding gene in humans

Identifiers
- Aliases: RABEPK, RAB9P40, bA65N13.1, p40, Rab9 effector protein with kelch motifs
- External IDs: OMIM: 605962; MGI: 2139530; HomoloGene: 48772; GeneCards: RABEPK; OMA:RABEPK - orthologs

Gene location (Human)
Chr.	Chromosome 9 (human)
Band	9q33.3	Start	125,200,542 bp
Band	9q33.3	End	125,234,161 bp

Gene location (Mouse)
Chr.	Chromosome 2 (mouse)
Band	2|2 B	Start	34,667,568 bp
Band	2|2 B	End	34,689,924 bp
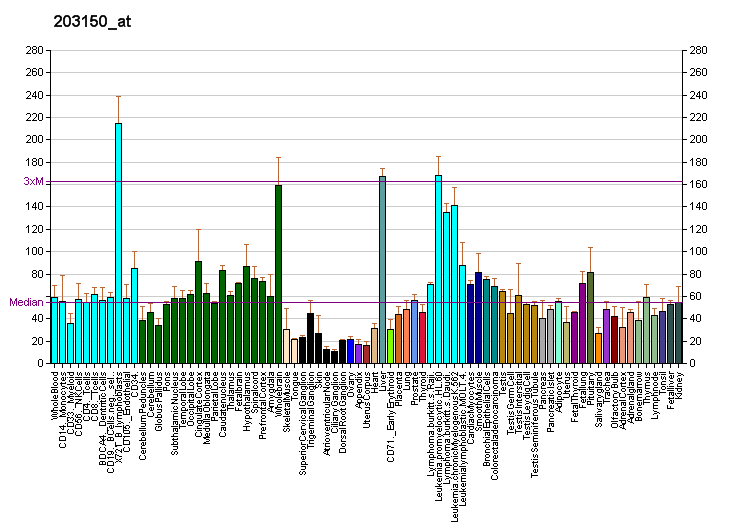
RNA expression pattern
Bgee	Human / Mouse (ortholog); Top expressed in: right lobe of liver; buccal mucosa cell; nucleus accumbens; putamen; caudate nucleus; prefrontal cortex; stromal cell of endometrium; right frontal lobe; Brodmann area 9; cingulate gyrus / Top expressed in: spermatid; seminiferous tubule; spermatocyte; yolk sac; dentate gyrus of hippocampal formation granule cell; embryo; epiblast; embryo; blastocyst; right kidney; More reference expression data
BioGPS	More reference expression data
Orthologs
Species	Human	Mouse
Entrez	10244	227746
Ensembl	ENSG00000136933	ENSMUSG00000070953
UniProt	Q7Z6M1; Q5T1S5	Q8VCH5
RefSeq (mRNA)	NM_001174152; NM_001174153; NM_005833	NM_145522; NM_001374669
RefSeq (protein)	NP_001167623; NP_001167624; NP_005824	NP_663497; NP_001361598
Location (UCSC)	Chr 9: 125.2 – 125.23 Mb	Chr 2: 34.67 – 34.69 Mb
PubMed search
- Wikidata
View/Edit Human	View/Edit Mouse

Rab9 effector protein with Kelch motifs also known as p40 is a protein that in humans is encoded by the RABEPK gene.

Membrane-associated p40, in together with RAB9A, facilitates the transport of the mannose 6-phosphate receptor (MPR) from endosomes to the trans-Golgi network.

== Interactions ==
RABEPK has been shown to interact with RAB9A and FYVE finger-containing phosphoinositide kinase.
