= Biogenesis of lysosome-related organelles complex 1 =

BLOC-1 or biogenesis of lysosome-related organelles complex 1 is a ubiquitously expressed multisubunit protein complex in a group of complexes that also includes BLOC-2 and BLOC-3. BLOC-1 is required for normal biogenesis of specialized organelles of the endosomal-lysosomal system, such as melanosomes and platelet dense granules. These organelles are called LROs (lysosome-related organelles) which are apparent in specific cell-types, such as melanocytes. The importance of BLOC-1 in membrane trafficking appears to extend beyond such LROs, as it has demonstrated roles in normal protein-sorting, normal membrane biogenesis, as well as vesicular trafficking. Thus, BLOC-1 is multi-purposed, with adaptable function depending on both organism and cell-type.

== Components ==
The identified protein subunits of BLOC-1 include:

- BLOC-1 subunit 1
- BLOC-1 subunit 2
- BLOC-1 subunit 3
- BLOC-1 subunit 4 (Cappuccino homolog)
- BLOC-1 subunit 5 (Muted homolog)
- BLOC-1 subunit 6 (Pallidin)
- BLOC-1 subunit 7 (Snapin)
- BLOC-1 subunit 8 (Dysbindin)

== Structure ==
Ultracentrifugation coupled with electron microscopy demonstrated that BLOC-1 has 8 subunits (pallidin, cappuccino, dysbindin, snapin, MUTED, BLOS1, BLOS2, and BLOS3) that are linked linearly to form a complex of roughly 300 Angstrom in length and 30 Angstrom in diameter. Bacterial recombination also demonstrated heterotrimeric subcomplexes containing pallidin, cappucinno, and BLOS1 as well as dysbindin, Snapin, and BLOS-2 as important intermediate structures. These subcomplexes may explain different functional outcomes observed by altering different BLOC-1 subunits. Furthermore, dynamic bending of the complex as much as 45 degrees indicates flexibility is likely linked to proper BLOC-1 function.

== Function ==
Within the endomembrane system, BLOC-1 acts at the early endosome, as witnessed in electron microscopy experiments, where it helps coordinate protein-sorting of LAMPS (lysosome-associate membrane proteins). Multiple studies recapitulate an association with the adaptor complex AP-3, a protein involved in vesicular trafficking of cargo from the early endosome to lysosomal compartments. BLOC-1 demonstrates physical association with AP-3 and BLOC-2 upon immunoprecipitation, although not to both complexes at the same time. Indeed, BLOC-1 functions in an AP-3 dependent route to sort CD63 (LAMP3) and Tyrp1. Furthermore, another study suggests an AP-3 dependent route of BLOC-1 also facilitates trafficking of LAMP1 and Vamp7-T1, a SNARE protein. An AP-3-independent, BLOC-2-dependent route of BLOC-1 sorting of Tyrp1 is also observed. Therefore, BLOC-1 appears to have multifaceted trafficking behavior. Indeed, AP-3 knockout mice maintain ability to deliver Tyrp1 to melanosomes, supporting existence of multiple BLOC-1 trafficking pathways. Evidence, however, suggests BLOC-2 may directly or indirectly intersect BLOC-1 trafficking downstream of early endosomes; BLOC-1 deficiency promotes missorted Tyrp1 at the plasma membrane, while BLOC-2 deficiency promotes Tyrp1 concentration at intermediate endosomal compartments. These studies demonstrate that BLOC-1 facilitates protein transport to lysosomal compartments, such as melanosomes, via multiple routes, although the exact functional association with BLOC-2 is unclear.

The majority of studies have focused on mammalian BLOC-1, presumably because of its association with multiple disease states in humans. Still, it is clear BLOC-1 has an evolutionarily conserved importance in trafficking because its yeast homolog, which contains Vab2, has been proposed to modulate Rab5 (Vps21), which is essential for its membrane localization, by acting as a receptor on early endosomes for Rab5-GAP Msb3. Although this study purports the function of BLOC-1 on early endosomes, it has recently been argued that yeast do not contain an early endosome. In light of these newer findings, it appears, BLOC-1 may actually act at the TGN in yeast. Nevertheless, BLOC-1 is important for proper endomembrane function in both lower and higher order eukaryotes.

In mammalian cells, most studies have focused on the ability of BLOC-1 to sort proteins. However, recent findings indicate that BLOC-1 has more complex functions in membrane biogenesis by associating with the cytoskeleton. Recycling endosome biogenesis is mediated by BLOC-1 as a hub for cytoskeletal activity. The kinesin KIF13A and actin machinery (AnxA2 and Arp2/3) appear to interact with BLOC-1 to generate recycling endosomes/recycling endosome tubules where microtubule action may lengthen tubules and microfilament action may stabilize or excise tubules. The BLOC-1 subunit pallidin associates with synaptic cytoskeletal components in Drosophila melanogaster neurons. Thus, BLOC-1 appears to engage in both protein sorting as well as membrane biogenesis via diverse mechanisms. Further study will be required to synthesize any of these molecular interactions into possible unified mechanisms.

== Clinical significance ==
Mutations in all BLOC complexes lead to diseased states characterized by Hermansky-Pudlak Syndrome (HPS), a pigmentation disorder subdivided into multiple types depending on the mutation, highlighting the role of BLOC-1 in proper LRO-function. BLOC-1 mutations also are thought to be linked to schizophrenia, and BLOC-1 dysfunction in the brain has important ramifications in neurotransmission. Much effort has been given to uncovering the molecular mechanisms of BLOC-1 function to understand its role in these diseases.

Studies of BLOC-1 in the nervous system have begun to link numerous molecular and cellular mechanisms to its proposed contribution to schizophrenia. Knock-down studies of the dysbindin gene DTNBP1 via siRNA demonstrated that the dysbindin subunit is integral for the signaling and recycling of the D2 receptor (DRD2) but not the D1 receptor. BLOC-1 mutations in dysbindin therefore can alter dopaminergic signaling in the brain which may confer symptoms of schizophrenia. These results appear to be relevant to the whole complex as the majority of expressed dysbindin localized to the BLOC-1 complex in the mouse brain. Furthermore, proper neurite extension appears to be regulated by BLOC-1, which may have molecular links to the ability of BLOC-1 to physically associate in vitro with SNARE proteins such as SNAP-25, SNAP-17, and syntaxin 13. This interaction with SNAREs could aid in membrane trafficking toward neurite extensions. Studies in Drosophila melanogaster indicate pallidin is non-essential for synaptic vesicle homeostasis or anatomy but is essential under conditions of increased neuronal signaling to maintain vesicular trafficking from endosomes via recycling mechanisms. The effects of a non-functional Bloc1s6 gene (encoding for pallidin) on the metabolome of the post-natal mouse hippocampus were explored using LC-MS, revealing altered levels of a variety of metabolites. Particularly intriguing effects include an increase in glutamate (and its precursor glutamine), an excitatory neurotransmitter linked to schizophrenia, as well as decreases in the neurotransmitters phenylalanine and tryptophan. Overall, modifications in the metabolome of these mice extend to nucleobase molecules and lysophospholipids as well, implicating further dysregulation effects of BLOC-1 deficiencies to plausible molecular contributions of schizophrenia.
