= BLOC-1 subunit 2 =

Protein found in humans

BLOC1S2

Identifiers
- Aliases: BLOC1S2, BLOS2, CEAP, CEAP11, BORCS2, biogenesis of lysosomal organelles complex 1 subunit 2
- External IDs: OMIM: 609768; MGI: 1920939; GeneCards: BLOC1S2

Gene location (Human)
| Chr. | Chromosome 10 (human) |
| Band | 10q24.31 | Start | 100,273,280 bp |
| Band | 10q24.31 | End | 100,286,680 bp |

Gene location (Mouse)
| Chr. | Chromosome 19 (mouse) |
| Band | 19|19 C3 | Start | 44,127,685 bp |
| Band | 19|19 C3 | End | 44,134,885 bp |
RNA expression pattern
| Bgee | Human / Mouse (ortholog); Top expressed in: tibialis anterior muscle; skin of arm; pons; pars compacta; Brodmann area 46; pars reticulata; skin of thigh; skin of hip; mucosa of ileum; vulva / Top expressed in: yolk sac; neural tube; bone marrow; spleen; granulocyte; mesencephalon; thymus; lens; olfactory bulb; epiblast; More reference expression data |
| BioGPS | n/a |
Gene ontology
| Molecular function | protein binding; gamma-tubulin binding; protein C-terminus binding; oxidoreductase activity |
| Cellular component | cytoplasm; cytosol; BLOC-1 complex; gamma-tubulin complex; microtubule organizing center; mitochondrion; cytoskeleton; axon cytoplasm; nucleus; centrosome; lysosome; lysosomal membrane; membrane; BORC complex |
| Biological process | platelet dense granule organization; anterograde axonal transport; positive regulation of transcription, DNA-templated; melanosome organization; positive regulation of cell population proliferation; anterograde synaptic vesicle transport; neuron projection development; mitochondrial outer membrane permeabilization; extrinsic apoptotic signaling pathway via death domain receptors; microtubule nucleation; lysosome localization; endosomal transport |
Sources:Amigo / QuickGO
Orthologs
| Databases | NCBI: entry; OMA: entry |
| Species | Human | Mouse |
| Entrez | 282991 | 73689 |
| Ensembl | ENSG00000196072 | ENSMUSG00000057506 |
| UniProt | Q6QNY1 | Q9CWG9 |
| RefSeq (mRNA) | NM_173809; NM_001001342; NM_001282436; NM_001282437; NM_001282438 NM_001282439 | NM_028607 |
| RefSeq (protein) | NP_001001342; NP_001269365; NP_001269366; NP_001269367; NP_001269368 NP_776170 | NP_082883 |
| Location (UCSC) | Chr 10: 100.27 – 100.29 Mb | Chr 19: 44.13 – 44.13 Mb |
| PubMed search |
- Wikidata
| View/Edit Human | View/Edit Mouse |

BLOC-1 subunit 2 is a protein that in humans is encoded by the BLOC1S2 gene. This is a multifunctional protein which is both part of Biogenesis of lysosome-related organelles complex 1 (BLOC-1), and is involved with centrosomes (explaining its alternative name centrosome-associated protein).

== Interactions ==
BLOC1S2 has been shown to interact with BLOC1S1, SNAPAP, MUTED, CNO and PLDN.
