= BLOC-1 subunit 1 =

Protein found in humans

BLOC1S1

Identifiers
- Aliases: BLOC1S1, BLOS1, GCN5L1, MICoA, RT14, BORCS1, biogenesis of lysosomal organelles complex 1 subunit 1
- External IDs: OMIM: 601444; MGI: 1195276; GeneCards: BLOC1S1

Gene location (Human)
Chr.	Chromosome 12 (human)
Band	12q13.2	Start	55,716,038 bp
Band	12q13.2	End	55,720,087 bp

Gene location (Mouse)
Chr.	Chromosome 10 (mouse)
Band	10 D3|10 77.19 cM	Start	128,753,751 bp
Band	10 D3|10 77.19 cM	End	128,759,904 bp
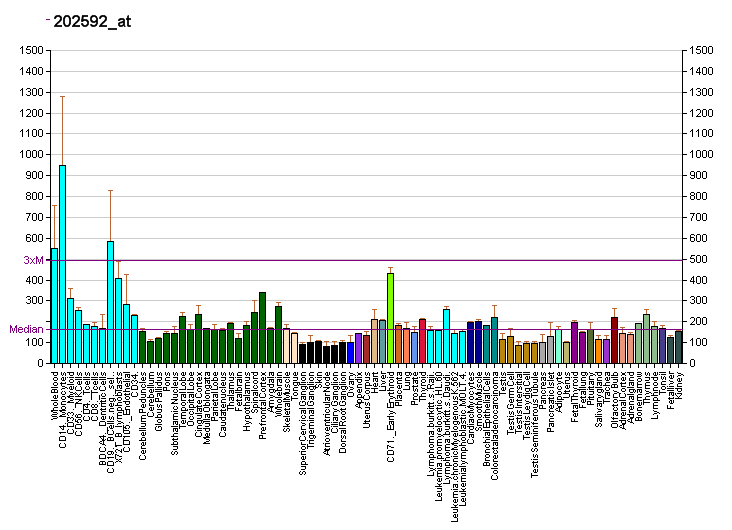
RNA expression pattern
Bgee	Human / Mouse (ortholog); Top expressed in: mucosa of transverse colon; C1 segment; substantia nigra; amygdala; putamen; hippocampus proper; granulocyte; muscle of thigh; prefrontal cortex; caudate nucleus / Top expressed in: white adipose tissue; urinary bladder; adrenal gland; proximal tubule; right kidney; muscle tissue; quadriceps femoris muscle; skeletal muscle tissue; human kidney; yolk sac; More reference expression data
BioGPS	More reference expression data
Gene ontology
Molecular function	protein binding
Cellular component	cytoplasm; cytosol; BLOC-1 complex; mitochondrial intermembrane space; mitochondrial matrix; mitochondrion; extracellular exosome; axon cytoplasm; extracellular space; lysosome; lysosomal membrane; membrane; BORC complex
Biological process	platelet dense granule organization; anterograde axonal transport; endosomal transport; melanosome organization; aerobic dissimilation; anterograde synaptic vesicle transport; neuron projection development; peptidyl-lysine acetylation; lysosome localization
Sources:Amigo / QuickGO
Orthologs
Databases	NCBI: entry; OMA: entry
Species	Human	Mouse
Entrez	2647	14533
Ensembl	ENSG00000135441	ENSMUSG00000090247
UniProt	P78537	O55102
RefSeq (mRNA)	NM_001487	NM_015740
RefSeq (protein)	NP_001478	NP_056555
Location (UCSC)	Chr 12: 55.72 – 55.72 Mb	Chr 10: 128.75 – 128.76 Mb
PubMed search
- Wikidata
View/Edit Human	View/Edit Mouse

BLOC-1 subunit 1 is a protein that in humans is encoded by the BLOC1S1 gene.

BLOC1S1 is a component of the ubiquitously expressed BLOC-1 (Biogenesis of lysosomal organelles complex 1) multisubunit protein complex. BLOC1 is required for normal biogenesis of specialized organelles of the endosomal-lysosomal system, such as melanosomes and platelet dense granules (Starcevic and Dell'Angelica, 2004).[supplied by OMIM]

== Interactions ==
BLOC1S1 has been shown to interact with BLOC1S2, SNAPAP and PLDN.
