= RAB9A =

Protein-coding gene in humans

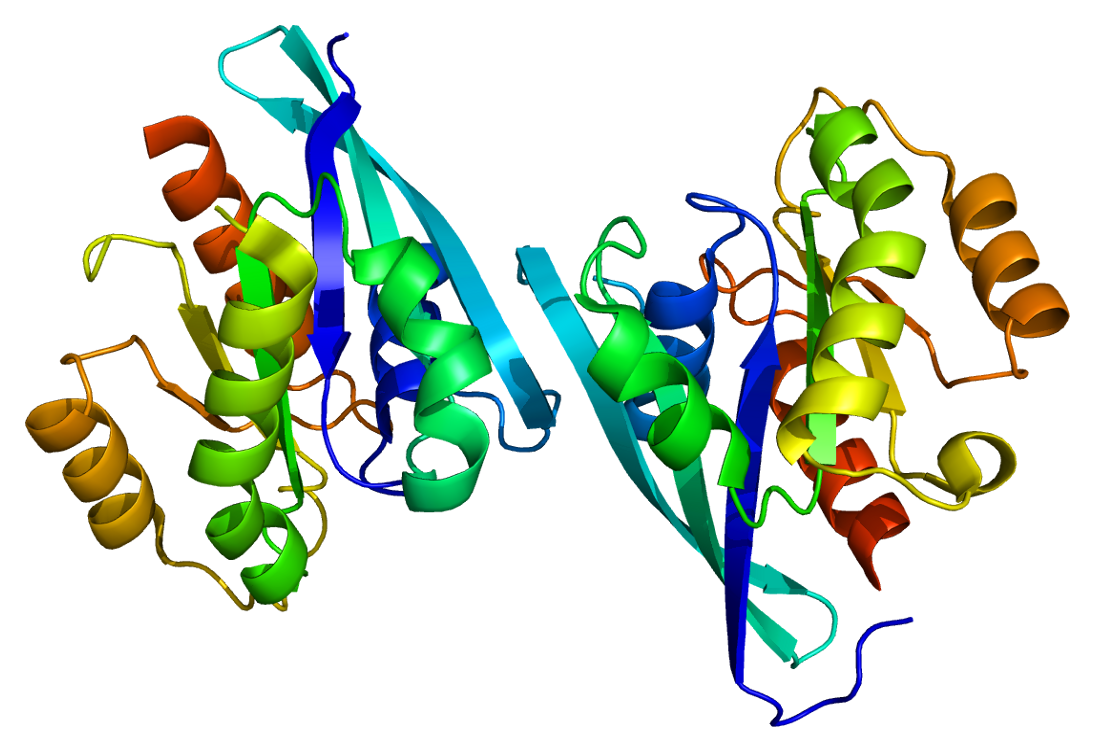

Identifiers
- Aliases: RAB9A, RAB9, member RAS oncogene family
- External IDs: OMIM: 300284; MGI: 1890695; GeneCards: RAB9A
Available structures
PDB	Ortholog search: PDBe RCSB
PDB	List of PDB id codes 1WMS
Enzyme activity
EC #	BRENDA	ExPASy	KEGG	MetaCyc
3.6.5.2	↗	↗	↗	↗

Gene location (Human)
Chr.	X chromosome (human)
Band	Xp22.2	Start	13,689,128 bp
Band	Xp22.2	End	13,710,504 bp

Gene location (Mouse)
Chr.	X chromosome (mouse)
Band	X|X F5	Start	165,240,249 bp
Band	X|X F5	End	165,262,863 bp
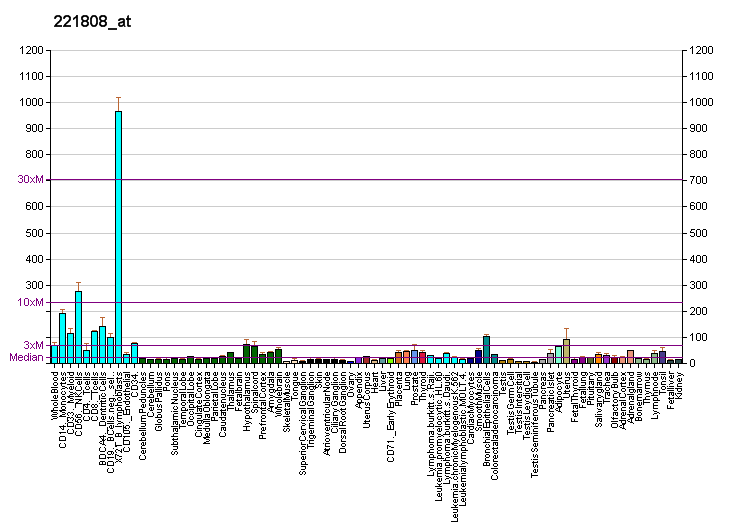
RNA expression pattern
Bgee	Human / Mouse (ortholog); Top expressed in: amniotic fluid; parotid gland; palpebral conjunctiva; corpus callosum; right adrenal cortex; skin of hip; epithelium of nasopharynx; left adrenal gland; skin of thigh; left adrenal cortex / Top expressed in: trigeminal ganglion; mucous cell of stomach; epithelium of small intestine; medial ganglionic eminence; left lobe of liver; epithelium of stomach; brown adipose tissue; calvaria; genital tubercle; left lung lobe; More reference expression data
BioGPS	More reference expression data
Gene ontology
Molecular function	nucleotide binding; GDP binding; GTP binding; protein binding; GTPase activity; identical protein binding
Cellular component	endosome; late endosome; phagocytic vesicle membrane; Golgi apparatus; endoplasmic reticulum membrane; membrane; Golgi membrane; plasma membrane; phagocytic vesicle; endoplasmic reticulum; lysosome; extracellular exosome; cytoplasmic vesicle; cytoplasmic vesicle membrane; trans-Golgi network membrane; cytosol; transport vesicle; melanosome
Biological process	regulation of protein localization; retrograde transport, endosome to Golgi; protein transport; positive regulation of exocytosis; transport; intracellular protein transport; Rab protein signal transduction
Sources:Amigo / QuickGO
Orthologs
Databases	NCBI: entry; OMA: entry
Species	Human	Mouse
Entrez	9367	56382
Ensembl	ENSG00000123595	ENSMUSG00000079316
UniProt	P51151	Q9R0M6
RefSeq (mRNA)	NM_004251; NM_001195328	NM_019773
RefSeq (protein)	NP_001182257; NP_004242	NP_062747
Location (UCSC)	Chr X: 13.69 – 13.71 Mb	Chr X: 165.24 – 165.26 Mb
PubMed search
- Wikidata
View/Edit Human	View/Edit Mouse

Ras-related protein Rab-9A is a protein that in humans is encoded by the RAB9A gene.

== Interactions ==
RAB9A has been shown to interact with RABEPK, TIP47 and the biogenesis of lysosome-related organelles complex 3.
