= FAM76B =

Protein-coding gene in the species Homo sapiens

Identifiers
- Aliases: FAM76B, family with sequence similarity 76 member B
- External IDs: MGI: 1920076; GeneCards: FAM76B

Gene location (Human)
| Chr. | Chromosome 11 (human) |
| Band | 11q21 | Start | 95,768,953 bp |
| Band | 11q21 | End | 95,790,409 bp |

Gene location (Mouse)
| Chr. | Chromosome 9 (mouse) |
| Band | 9|9 A1 | Start | 13,739,012 bp |
| Band | 9|9 A1 | End | 13,766,283 bp |
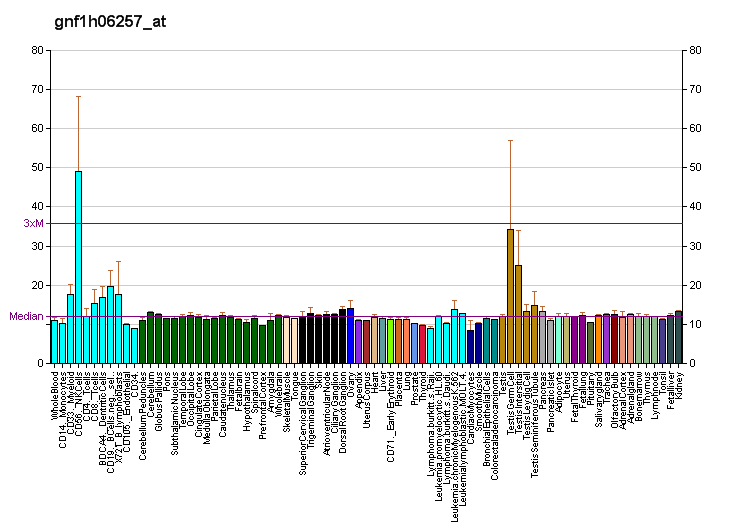
RNA expression pattern
| Bgee | Human / Mouse (ortholog); Top expressed in: sperm; Achilles tendon; left testis; right testis; pancreatic epithelial cell; sural nerve; appendix; right lung; monocyte; left ovary / Top expressed in: Paneth cell; superior cervical ganglion; cumulus cell; conjunctival fornix; medial ganglionic eminence; skin of external ear; stroma of bone marrow; ciliary body; hair follicle; sciatic nerve; More reference expression data |
| BioGPS | More reference expression data |
Gene ontology
| Molecular function | protein binding |
| Cellular component | nucleus; nuclear speck; membrane; integral component of membrane |
| Biological process | protein desumoylation |
Sources:Amigo / QuickGO
Orthologs
| Databases | NCBI: entry; OMA: entry |
| Species | Human | Mouse |
| Entrez | 143684 | 72826 |
| Ensembl | ENSG00000077458 | ENSMUSG00000037808 |
| UniProt | Q5HYJ3 | Q80XP8 |
| RefSeq (mRNA) | NM_144664; NM_001330357 | NM_176836; NM_001358259 |
| RefSeq (protein) | NP_001317286; NP_653265 | NP_789806; NP_001345188 |
| Location (UCSC) | Chr 11: 95.77 – 95.79 Mb | Chr 9: 13.74 – 13.77 Mb |
| PubMed search |
- Wikidata
| View/Edit Human | View/Edit Mouse |

Protein FAM76B is a protein that in humans is encoded by the FAM76B gene.
