= STX12 =

Protein-coding gene in humans

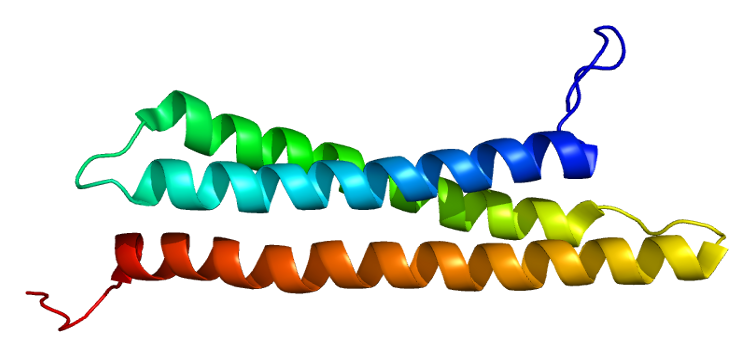

Identifiers
- Aliases: STX12, STX13, STX14, syntaxin 12
- External IDs: OMIM: 606892; MGI: 1931027; GeneCards: STX12
Available structures
PDB	Ortholog search: PDBe RCSB
PDB	List of PDB id codes 2DNX

Gene location (Human)
Chr.	Chromosome 1 (human)
Band	1p35.3	Start	27,773,219 bp
Band	1p35.3	End	27,824,443 bp

Gene location (Mouse)
Chr.	Chromosome 4 (mouse)
Band	4 D2.3|4 66.01 cM	Start	132,580,812 bp
Band	4 D2.3|4 66.01 cM	End	132,611,820 bp
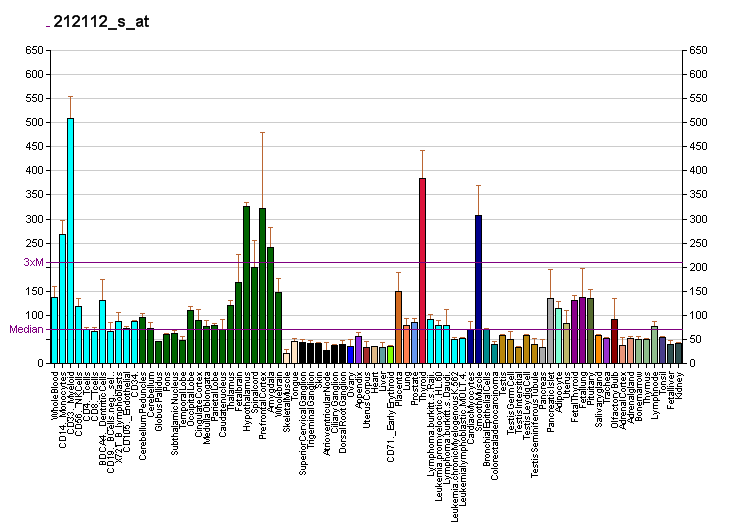

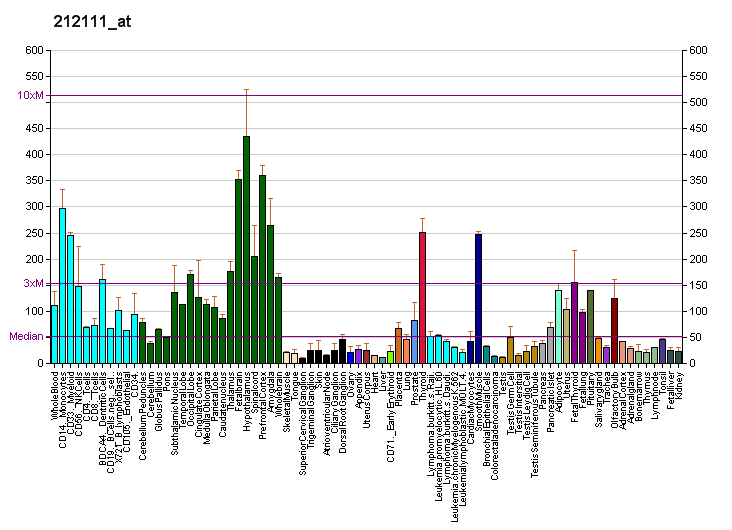
RNA expression pattern
Bgee	Human / Mouse (ortholog); Top expressed in: middle temporal gyrus; corpus epididymis; Brodmann area 23; left lobe of thyroid gland; right lobe of thyroid gland; lower lobe of lung; tail of epididymis; superior frontal gyrus; pars reticulata; Brodmann area 46 / Top expressed in: transitional epithelium of urinary bladder; medial ganglionic eminence; pyloric antrum; amygdala; Region I of hippocampus proper; habenula; cingulate gyrus; paraventricular nucleus of hypothalamus; arcuate nucleus; dorsomedial hypothalamic nucleus; More reference expression data
BioGPS	More reference expression data
Gene ontology
Molecular function	SNAP receptor activity; protein binding; SNARE binding
Cellular component	integral component of membrane; vesicle; endosome; Golgi apparatus; membrane; Golgi membrane; BLOC-1 complex; phagophore assembly site; SNARE complex; phagocytic vesicle; membrane raft; endosome membrane; endomembrane system; early endosome membrane; recycling endosome membrane; synaptic vesicle; integral component of synaptic vesicle membrane; postsynaptic recycling endosome
Biological process	protein stabilization; autophagosome assembly; vesicle docking; cholesterol efflux; protein transport; intracellular protein transport; vesicle fusion; vesicle-mediated transport
Sources:Amigo / QuickGO
Orthologs
Databases	NCBI: entry; OMA: entry
Species	Human	Mouse
Entrez	23673	100226
Ensembl	ENSG00000117758	ENSMUSG00000028879
UniProt	Q86Y82	Q9ER00
RefSeq (mRNA)	NM_177424	NM_133887
RefSeq (protein)	NP_803173	NP_598648
Location (UCSC)	Chr 1: 27.77 – 27.82 Mb	Chr 4: 132.58 – 132.61 Mb
PubMed search
- Wikidata
View/Edit Human	View/Edit Mouse

Syntaxin-12 is a protein that in humans is encoded by the STX12 gene.

== Interactions ==
STX12 has been shown to interact with PLDN.
