= HPS4 =

Protein-coding gene humans

Identifiers
- Aliases: HPS4, LE, BLOC3S2, biogenesis of lysosomal organelles complex 3 subunit 2, HPS4 biogenesis of lysosomal organelles complex 3 subunit 2
- External IDs: OMIM: 606682; MGI: 2177742; GeneCards: HPS4

Gene location (Human)
Chr.	Chromosome 22 (human)
Band	22q12.1	Start	26,443,423 bp
Band	22q12.1	End	26,483,837 bp

Gene location (Mouse)
Chr.	Chromosome 5 (mouse)
Band	5 F|5 54.69 cM	Start	112,490,949 bp
Band	5 F|5 54.69 cM	End	112,526,280 bp
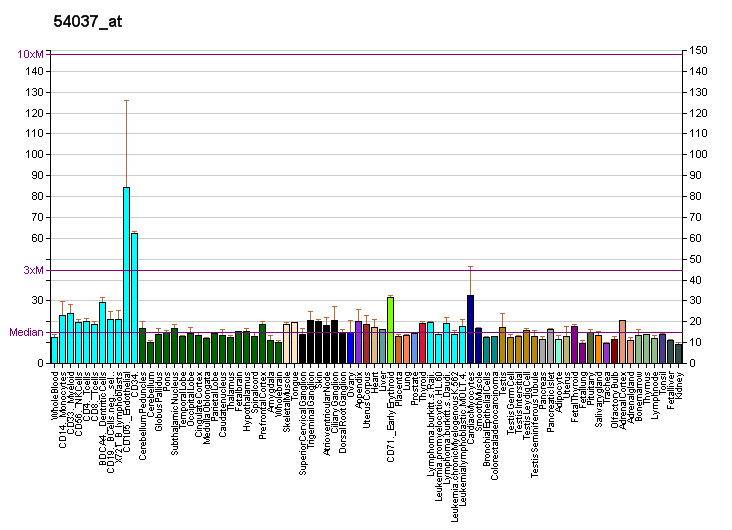

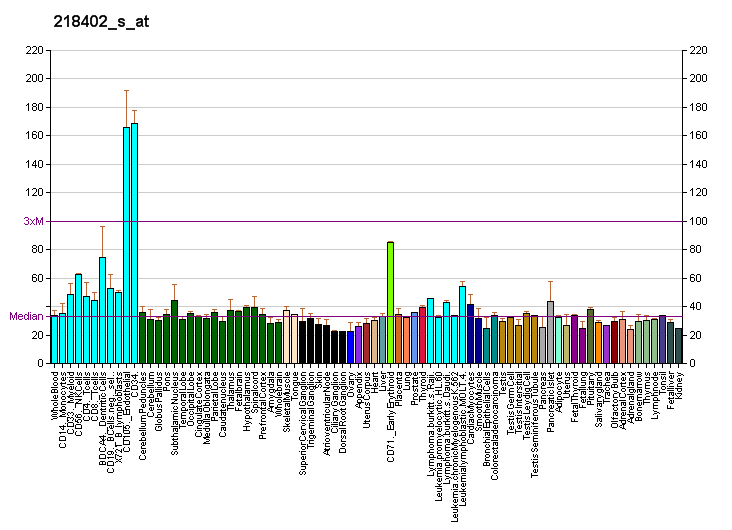
RNA expression pattern
Bgee	Human / Mouse (ortholog); Top expressed in: cerebellar hemisphere; right hemisphere of cerebellum; skin of leg; sural nerve; testicle; skin of abdomen; right testis; left testis; right uterine tube; anterior pituitary / Top expressed in: internal carotid artery; external carotid artery; motor neuron; spermatocyte; Rostral migratory stream; spermatid; crypt of lieberkuhn of small intestine; vestibular sensory epithelium; retinal pigment epithelium; vestibular membrane of cochlear duct; More reference expression data
BioGPS	More reference expression data
Gene ontology
Molecular function	protein binding; protein homodimerization activity; protein dimerization activity; guanyl-nucleotide exchange factor activity
Cellular component	cytoplasm; melanosome; platelet dense granule; lysosome; BLOC-3 complex; membrane; cytosol; cytoplasmic vesicle
Biological process	hemostasis; protein targeting; protein stabilization; lysosome organization; blood coagulation; melanocyte differentiation; organelle organization; positive regulation of eye pigmentation; positive regulation of protein targeting to mitochondrion; melanosome assembly; regulation of molecular function
Sources:Amigo / QuickGO
Orthologs
Databases	NCBI: entry; OMA: entry
Species	Human	Mouse
Entrez	89781	192232
Ensembl	ENSG00000100099	ENSMUSG00000042328
UniProt	Q9NQG7	Q99KG7
RefSeq (mRNA)	NM_022081; NM_152840; NM_152841; NM_152842; NM_152843 NM_001349896; NM_001349898; NM_001349899; NM_001349900; NM_001349901; NM_001349902; NM_001349903; NM_001349904; NM_001349905	NM_138646; NM_001359853
RefSeq (protein)	NP_071364; NP_690054; NP_001336825; NP_001336827; NP_001336828 NP_001336829; NP_001336830; NP_001336831; NP_001336832; NP_001336833; NP_001336834; NP_071364.4	NP_619587; NP_001346782
Location (UCSC)	Chr 22: 26.44 – 26.48 Mb	Chr 5: 112.49 – 112.53 Mb
PubMed search
- Wikidata
View/Edit Human	View/Edit Mouse

Hermansky–Pudlak syndrome 4 protein is a protein that in humans is encoded by the HPS4 gene.

Hermansky–Pudlak syndrome is a disorder of organelle biogenesis in which oculocutaneous albinism, bleeding, and pulmonary fibrosis result from defects of melanosomes, platelet dense granules, and lysosomes. Mutations in this gene as well as several others can cause this syndrome. The protein encoded by this gene appears to be important in organelle biogenesis and is similar to the mouse 'light ear' protein. Five transcript variants encoding different isoforms have been found for this gene. In addition, transcript variants utilizing alternative polyadenylation signals exist.

In melanocytic cells HPS4 gene expression may be regulated by MITF.
