= BLOC-1 subunit 6 =

Protein found in humans

BLOC1S6

Identifiers
- Aliases: BLOC1S6, BLOS6, HPS9, PA, PALLID, PLDN, biogenesis of lysosomal organelles complex 1 subunit 6
- External IDs: OMIM: 604310; MGI: 1927580; GeneCards: BLOC1S6

Gene location (Human)
Chr.	Chromosome 15 (human)
Band	15q21.1	Start	45,587,214 bp
Band	15q21.1	End	45,615,945 bp

Gene location (Mouse)
Chr.	Chromosome 2 (mouse)
Band	2 E5|2 60.66 cM	Start	122,580,423 bp
Band	2 E5|2 60.66 cM	End	122,591,395 bp
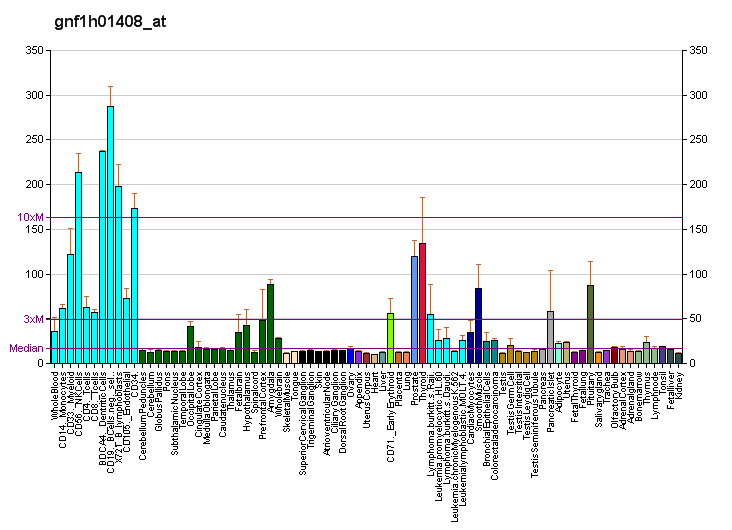

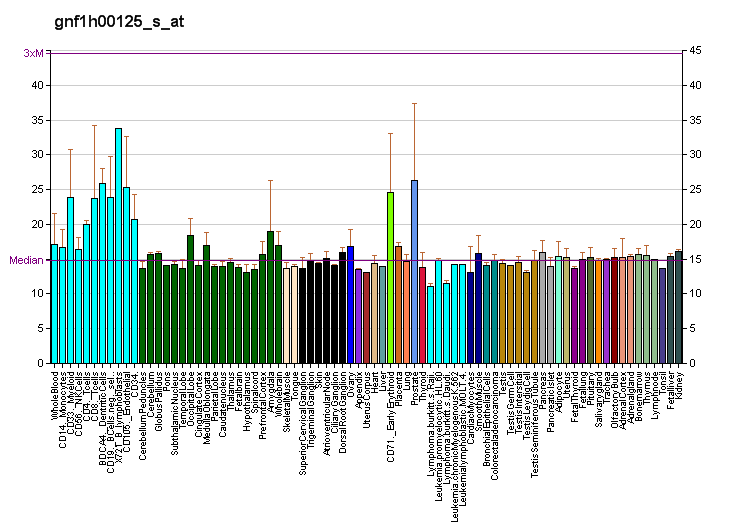
RNA expression pattern
Bgee	Human / Mouse (ortholog); Top expressed in: pancreatic epithelial cell; epithelium of colon; pancreatic ductal cell; endothelial cell; germinal epithelium; bone marrow cell; pars compacta; superficial temporal artery; Brodmann area 23; parietal pleura / Top expressed in: interventricular septum; otic vesicle; myocardium of ventricle; saccule; stroma of bone marrow; sternocleidomastoid muscle; primitive streak; barrel cortex; triceps brachii muscle; abdominal wall; More reference expression data
BioGPS	More reference expression data
Gene ontology
Molecular function	protein homodimerization activity; actin filament binding; protein binding; identical protein binding; syntaxin binding
Cellular component	cytoplasm; cytosol; membrane; transport vesicle; SNARE complex; extrinsic component of membrane; presynapse; axon cytoplasm; BLOC-1 complex; synapse
Biological process	synaptic vesicle docking; positive regulation of pigment cell differentiation; melanosome organization; melanosome transport; endosome to melanosome transport; anterograde axonal transport; neuron projection development; anterograde synaptic vesicle transport
Sources:Amigo / QuickGO
Orthologs
Databases	NCBI: entry; OMA: entry
Species	Human	Mouse
Entrez	26258	18457
Ensembl	ENSG00000104164	ENSMUSG00000005804
UniProt	Q9UL45	Q9R0C0
RefSeq (mRNA)	NM_001311255; NM_001311256; NM_012388	NM_019788
RefSeq (protein)	NP_001298184; NP_001298185; NP_036520	NP_062762
Location (UCSC)	Chr 15: 45.59 – 45.62 Mb	Chr 2: 122.58 – 122.59 Mb
PubMed search
- Wikidata
View/Edit Human	View/Edit Mouse

BLOC-1 subunit 6 (also called Pallidin) is a protein that in humans is encoded by the BLOC1S6 gene (previously PLDN). This protein is part of Biogenesis of lysosome-related organelles complex 1 (BLOC-1), which is a protein complex which is involved in the biogenesis of the lysosome-related organelles (LROs) like dense granules and melanosomes.

== Function ==
The protein encoded by this gene may play a role in intracellular vesicle trafficking. It interacts with Syntaxin 13 which mediates intracellular membrane fusion. Several alternatively spliced transcript variants of this gene have been described, but the full-length nature of some of these variants has not been determined.

== Interactions ==
PLDN has been shown to interact with:

- BLOC1S1,
- BLOC1S2,
- CNO,
- Dysbindin,
- MUTED,
- SNAPAP, and
- STX12.
