= HPS1 =

Protein-coding gene in humans

Identifiers
- Aliases: HPS1, HPS, BLOC3S1, biogenesis of lysosomal organelles complex 3 subunit 1, HPS1 biogenesis of lysosomal organelles complex 3 subunit 1
- External IDs: OMIM: 604982; MGI: 2177763; GeneCards: HPS1

Gene location (Human)
Chr.	Chromosome 10 (human)
Band	10q24.2	Start	98,416,198 bp
Band	10q24.2	End	98,446,935 bp

Gene location (Mouse)
Chr.	Chromosome 19 (mouse)
Band	19 C3|19 36.56 cM	Start	42,743,544 bp
Band	19 C3|19 36.56 cM	End	42,768,417 bp
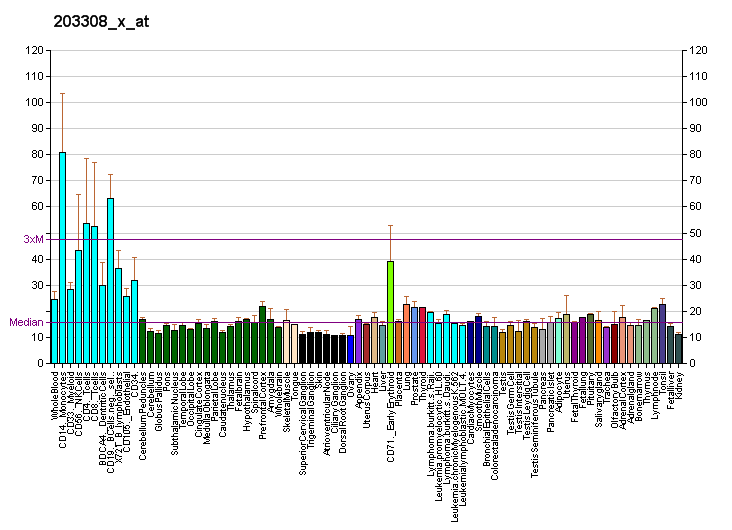

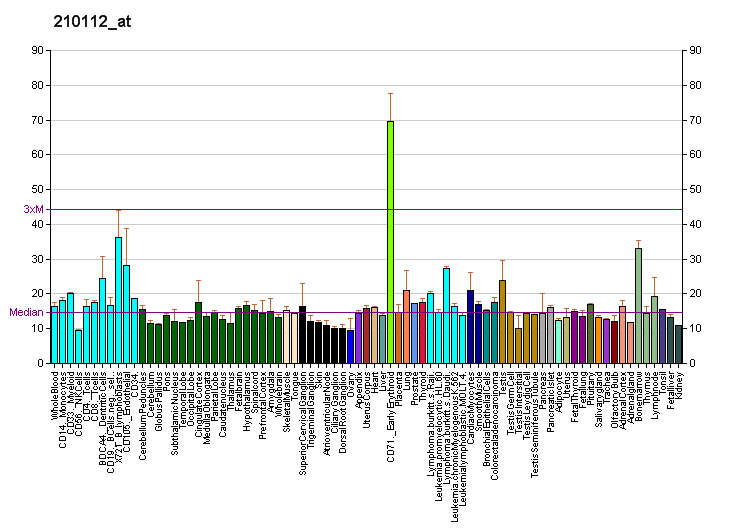

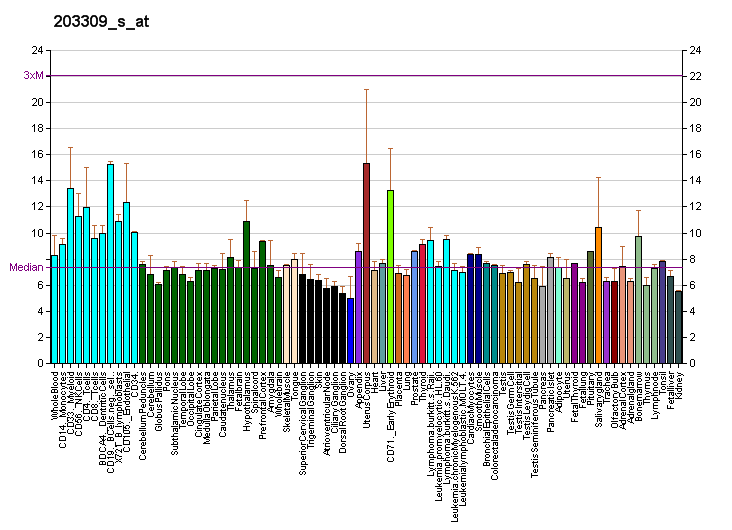
RNA expression pattern
Bgee	Human / Mouse (ortholog); Top expressed in: granulocyte; stromal cell of endometrium; monocyte; transverse colon; canal of the cervix; minor salivary glands; right adrenal cortex; right coronary artery; mucosa of transverse colon; right uterine tube / Top expressed in: seminal vesicula; epithelium of lens; lacrimal gland; islet of Langerhans; epithelium of stomach; granulocyte; umbilical cord; gastrula; salivary gland; right kidney; More reference expression data
BioGPS	More reference expression data
Gene ontology
Molecular function	protein binding; protein dimerization activity; guanyl-nucleotide exchange factor activity
Cellular component	integral component of plasma membrane; BLOC-3 complex; lysosome; cytoplasm; cytosol; cytoplasmic vesicle
Biological process	lysosome organization; response to stimulus; visual perception; melanosome assembly
Sources:Amigo / QuickGO
Orthologs
Databases	NCBI: entry; OMA: entry
Species	Human	Mouse
Entrez	3257	192236
Ensembl	ENSG00000107521	ENSMUSG00000025188
UniProt	Q92902	O08983
RefSeq (mRNA)	NM_000195; NM_001311345; NM_182637; NM_182638; NM_182639 NM_001322476; NM_001322477; NM_001322478; NM_001322479; NM_001322480; NM_001322481; NM_001322482; NM_001322483; NM_001322484; NM_001322485; NM_001322487; NM_001322489; NM_001322490; NM_001322491; NM_001322492	NM_019424; NM_001346703; NM_001362410
RefSeq (protein)	NP_000186; NP_001298274; NP_001309405; NP_001309406; NP_001309407 NP_001309408; NP_001309409; NP_001309410; NP_001309411; NP_001309412; NP_001309413; NP_001309414; NP_001309416; NP_001309418; NP_001309419; NP_001309420; NP_001309421; NP_872577	NP_001333632; NP_062297; NP_001349339
Location (UCSC)	Chr 10: 98.42 – 98.45 Mb	Chr 19: 42.74 – 42.77 Mb
PubMed search
- Wikidata
View/Edit Human	View/Edit Mouse

Hermansky–Pudlak syndrome 1 protein is a protein that in humans is encoded by the HPS1 gene.

This gene encodes a protein that may play a role in organelle biogenesis associated with melanosomes, platelet dense granules, and lysosomes. The encoded protein is a component of three different protein complexes termed biogenesis of lysosome-related organelles complex (BLOC)-3, BLOC4, and BLOC5. Mutations in this gene are associated with Hermansky–Pudlak syndrome type 1. Multiple transcript variants encoding distinct isoforms have been identified for this gene; the full-length sequences of some of these have not been determined yet.
