= SNAPIN =

Protein-coding gene in humans

Identifiers
- Aliases: SNAPIN, BLOC1S7, BLOS7, SNAPAP, BORCS3, SNAP associated protein
- External IDs: OMIM: 607007; MGI: 1333745; GeneCards: SNAPIN

Gene location (Human)
Chr.	Chromosome 1 (human)
Band	1q21.3	Start	153,658,703 bp
Band	1q21.3	End	153,661,852 bp

Gene location (Mouse)
Chr.	Chromosome 3 (mouse)
Band	3|3 F1	Start	90,395,333 bp
Band	3|3 F1	End	90,398,340 bp
RNA expression pattern
Bgee	Human / Mouse (ortholog); Top expressed in: oocyte; myocardium of left ventricle; secondary oocyte; cardiac muscle tissue of right atrium; Skeletal muscle tissue of biceps brachii; tibialis anterior muscle; apex of heart; quadriceps femoris muscle; right adrenal cortex; vastus lateralis muscle / Top expressed in: cumulus cell; temporal muscle; muscle of thigh; sternocleidomastoid muscle; triceps brachii muscle; utricle; digastric muscle; anterior horn of spinal cord; quadriceps femoris muscle; gastrocnemius muscle; More reference expression data
BioGPS	n/a
Gene ontology
Molecular function	protein binding; SNARE binding
Cellular component	cytoplasm; cytosol; membrane; synaptic vesicle; BLOC-1 complex; Golgi membrane; synapse; synaptic vesicle membrane; secretory granule; cell junction; perinuclear region of cytoplasm; cytoplasmic vesicle; axon cytoplasm; lysosome; lysosomal membrane; Golgi apparatus; BORC complex
Biological process	negative regulation of neuron projection development; positive regulation of late endosome to lysosome transport; endosome to lysosome transport; synaptic vesicle exocytosis; synaptic vesicle fusion to presynaptic active zone membrane; anterograde axonal transport; melanosome organization; autophagosome maturation; synaptic vesicle transport; terminal button organization; anterograde synaptic vesicle transport; intracellular protein transport; viral process; neuron projection development; regulation of protein binding; synaptic vesicle maturation; neurotransmitter secretion; exocytosis; chemical synaptic transmission; retrograde axonal transport; late endosome to lysosome transport; protein maturation; lysosomal lumen acidification; lysosome organization; lysosome localization; regulation of synaptic vesicle exocytosis
Sources:Amigo / QuickGO
Orthologs
Databases	NCBI: entry; OMA: entry
Species	Human	Mouse
Entrez	23557	20615
Ensembl	ENSG00000143553	ENSMUSG00000001018
UniProt	O95295	Q9Z266
RefSeq (mRNA)	NM_012437	NM_133854
RefSeq (protein)	NP_036569	NP_598615
Location (UCSC)	Chr 1: 153.66 – 153.66 Mb	Chr 3: 90.4 – 90.4 Mb
PubMed search
- Wikidata
View/Edit Human	View/Edit Mouse

SNARE-associated protein Snapin is a protein that in humans is encoded by the SNAPIN gene (previously SNAPAP).

== Function ==
SNAPAP is a component of the SNARE complex of proteins that is required for synaptic vesicle docking and fusion. SNAPAP is also a component of the ubiquitously expressed BLOC1 multisubunit protein complex. BLOC1 is required for normal biogenesis of specialized organelles of the endosomal-lysosomal system, such as melanosomes and platelet dense granules.

Snapin has been established to be a promoter of vesicle docking, as it plays a role in binding to SNAP-25, which together stabilize and favor SNARE complex assembly and vesicle docking. Specifically, the degree to which snapin is necessary for proper synaptic release varies across species. The functions of snapin have been reported to be independent of synaptotagmin, and works through the SNAP-25 pathway to stabilize, prime, and dock vesicles.

== Interactions ==
SNAPAP has been shown to interact with:

- BLOC1S1,
- BLOC1S2,
- Dysbindin,
- PLDN,
- RGS7,
- SNAP-25,
- SNAP23, and
- TRPV1.
