= Mossy fiber =

Mossy fiber may refer to two different bundles of axons in the brain:

- Mossy fiber (cerebellum)
- Mossy fiber (hippocampus)
