= HPS3 =

Protein-coding gene in the species Homo sapiens

Identifiers
- Aliases: HPS3, SUTAL, BLOC2S1, biogenesis of lysosomal organelles complex 2 subunit 1, HPS3 biogenesis of lysosomal organelles complex 2 subunit 1
- External IDs: OMIM: 606118; MGI: 2153839; HomoloGene: 13019; GeneCards: HPS3; OMA:HPS3 - orthologs

Gene location (Human)
Chr.	Chromosome 3 (human)
Band	3q24	Start	149,129,638 bp
Band	3q24	End	149,173,732 bp

Gene location (Mouse)
Chr.	Chromosome 3 (mouse)
Band	3 A2|3 6.12 cM	Start	20,050,109 bp
Band	3 A2|3 6.12 cM	End	20,089,479 bp
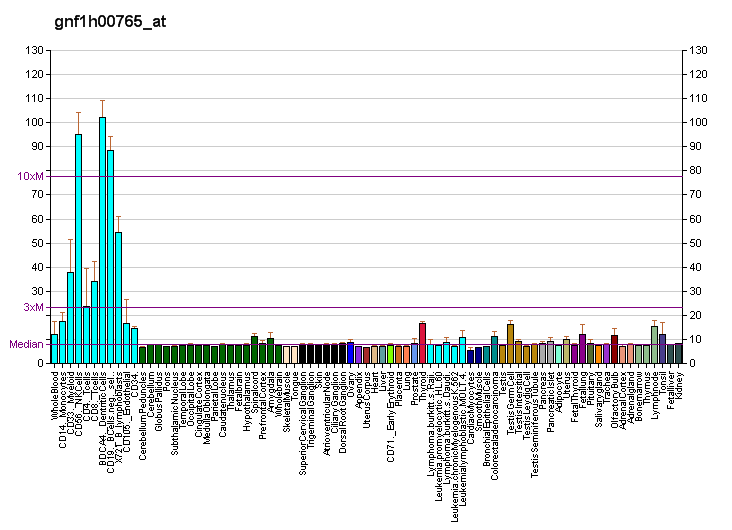

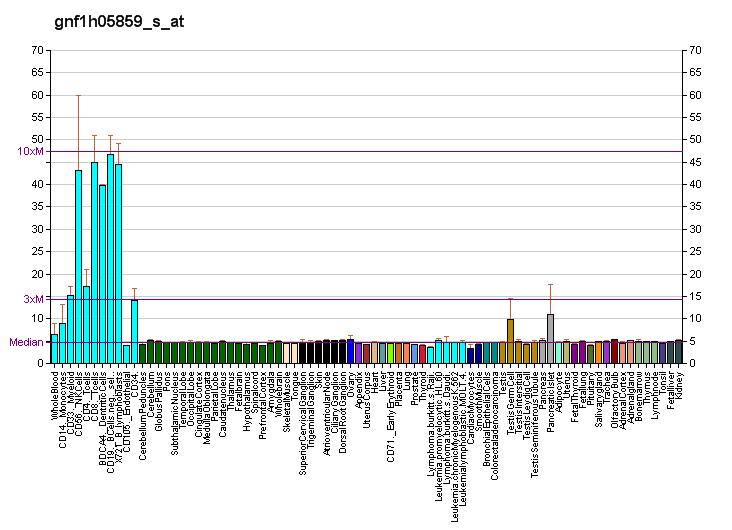
RNA expression pattern
Bgee	Human / Mouse (ortholog); Top expressed in: mucosa of ileum; secondary oocyte; jejunal mucosa; nasal epithelium; lymph node; duodenum; monocyte; spleen; retinal pigment epithelium; islet of Langerhans / Top expressed in: granulocyte; spleen; blood; stroma of bone marrow; lymph node; tibiofemoral joint; mesenteric lymph nodes; right kidney; neural layer of retina; right ventricle; More reference expression data
BioGPS	More reference expression data
Gene ontology
Molecular function	protein binding
Cellular component	cytoplasm; BLOC-2 complex; cytosol
Biological process	pigmentation; organelle organization
Sources:Amigo / QuickGO
Orthologs
Species	Human	Mouse
Entrez	84343	12807
Ensembl	ENSG00000163755	ENSMUSG00000027615
UniProt	Q969F9	Q91VB4
RefSeq (mRNA)	NM_001308258; NM_032383	NM_001146323; NM_001146324; NM_080634
RefSeq (protein)	NP_001295187; NP_115759	NP_001139795; NP_001139796; NP_542365
Location (UCSC)	Chr 3: 149.13 – 149.17 Mb	Chr 3: 20.05 – 20.09 Mb
PubMed search
- Wikidata
View/Edit Human	View/Edit Mouse

Hermansky–Pudlak syndrome 3 protein is a protein that in humans is encoded by the HPS3 gene.

This gene encodes a protein containing a potential clathrin-binding motif, consensus dileucine signals, and tyrosine-based sorting signals for targeting to vesicles of lysosomal lineage. The encoded protein may play a role in organelle biogenesis associated with melanosomes, platelet dense granules, and lysosomes. Mutations in this gene are associated with Hermansky–Pudlak syndrome type 3. Alternate splice variants exist, but their full length sequence has not been determined.
