= HPS5 =

Protein-coding gene in the species Homo sapiens

Identifiers
- Aliases: HPS5, AIBP63, BLOC2S2, biogenesis of lysosomal organelles complex 2 subunit 2, HPS5 biogenesis of lysosomal organelles complex 2 subunit 2
- External IDs: OMIM: 607521; MGI: 2180307; GeneCards: HPS5

Gene location (Human)
Chr.	Chromosome 11 (human)
Band	11p15.1	Start	18,278,668 bp
Band	11p15.1	End	18,322,198 bp

Gene location (Mouse)
Chr.	Chromosome 7 (mouse)
Band	7 B3|7 30.56 cM	Start	46,409,890 bp
Band	7 B3|7 30.56 cM	End	46,445,488 bp
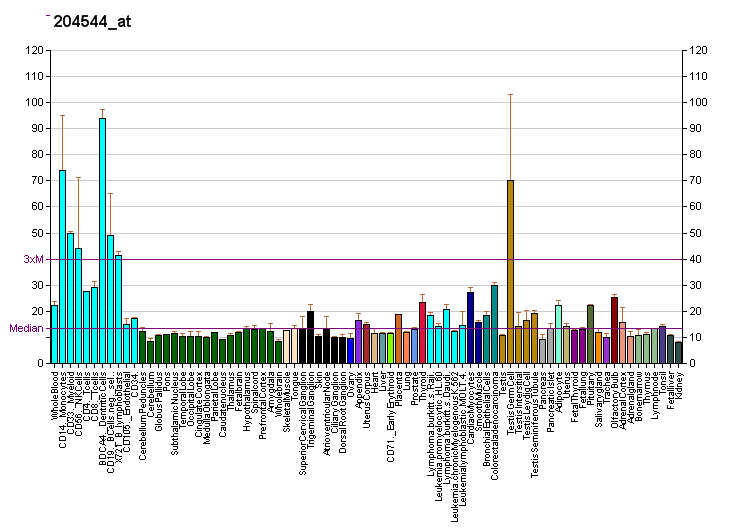
RNA expression pattern
Bgee	Human / Mouse (ortholog); Top expressed in: sural nerve; testicle; liver; corpus callosum; tonsil; right lobe of liver; lymph node; Achilles tendon; salivary gland; minor salivary glands / Top expressed in: proximal tubule; right kidney; epithelium of small intestine; spermatocyte; superior cervical ganglion; human kidney; granulocyte; yolk sac; ventricular zone; jejunum; More reference expression data
BioGPS	More reference expression data
Gene ontology
Molecular function	protein binding
Cellular component	cytoplasm; BLOC-2 complex; cytosol
Biological process	pigmentation; blood coagulation; organelle organization
Sources:Amigo / QuickGO
Orthologs
Databases	NCBI: entry; OMA: entry
Species	Human	Mouse
Entrez	11234	246694
Ensembl	ENSG00000110756; ENSG00000288445	ENSMUSG00000014418
UniProt	Q9UPZ3	P59438
RefSeq (mRNA)	NM_007216; NM_181507; NM_181508	NM_001005247; NM_001005248; NM_001167864; NM_178742
RefSeq (protein)	NP_009147; NP_852608; NP_852609	NP_001005247; NP_001005248; NP_001161336
Location (UCSC)	Chr 11: 18.28 – 18.32 Mb	Chr 7: 46.41 – 46.45 Mb
PubMed search
- Wikidata
View/Edit Human	View/Edit Mouse

Hermansky–Pudlak syndrome 5 protein is a protein that in humans is encoded by the HPS5 gene.

This gene encodes a protein that may play a role in organelle biogenesis associated with melanosomes, platelet dense granules, and lysosomes. This protein interacts with Hermansky–Pudlak syndrome 6 protein and may interact with the cytoplasmic domain of integrin, alpha-3. Mutations in this gene are associated with Hermansky–Pudlak syndrome type 5. Multiple transcript variants encoding two distinct isoforms have been identified for this gene.
