= Cutis laxa =

Skin which is abnormally inelastic and hangs loosely

- Other names: Chalazoderma, dermatochalasia, dermatolysis, dermatomegaly, generalized elastolysis, generalized elastorrhexis, pachydermatocele
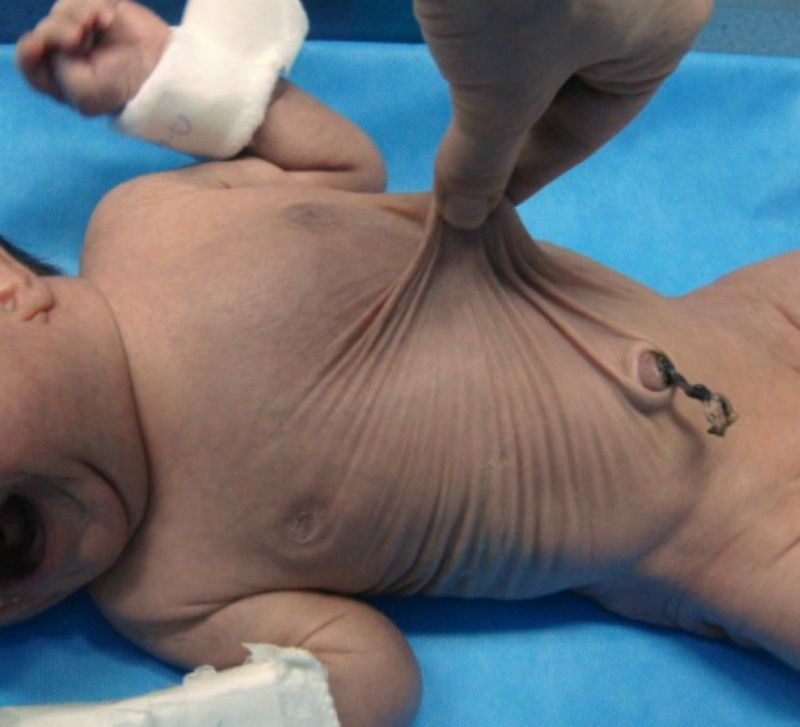
- Cutis laxa in a neonate
- Specialty: Medical genetics
- Differential diagnosis: Progeroid syndromes, Ehlers-Danlos syndrome

Cutis laxa or pachydermatocele is a group of rare connective tissue disorders in which the skin becomes inelastic and hangs loosely in folds.

== Signs and symptoms ==
It is characterised by skin that is loose, hanging, wrinkled, and lacking in elasticity. The loose skin can be either generalised or localised. Biopsies have shown reduction and degeneration of dermal elastic fibres in the affected areas of skin. The loose skin is often most noticeable on the face, resulting in a prematurely aged appearance. The affected areas of skin may be thickened and dark. In addition, the joints may be loose (hypermobile) because of lax ligaments and tendons. When cutis laxa is severe, it can also affect the internal organs. The lungs, heart (supravalvular pulmonary stenosis), intestines, or arteries may be affected with a variety of severe impairments. In some cases, hernias and outpouching of the bladder can be observed. Patients can also present with whites of the eyes that are blue.

== Causes ==
In many cases, cutis laxa is inherited. Autosomal dominant, autosomal recessive, and X-linked recessive forms have been described, but acquired forms also occur.

Cutis laxa is associated with deficient or absent elastin fibers in the extracellular matrix. This can be related to decreased elastin synthesis or structural defects in the extracellular matrix.

Cutis laxa may be caused by mutations in the genes: ELN, ATP6V0A2, ATP7A, FBLN4, FBLN5, and PYCR1. A related neurocutaneous syndrome may be caused by mutations in the gene ALDH18A1 (P5CS). Cutis laxa may also be seen in association with inherited connective tissue disorders such as Ehlers–Danlos syndromes. Another syndrome associated with cutis laxa is Lenz–Majewski syndrome which is due to a mutation in the phosphatidylserine synthase 1 (PTDSS1) gene.

In contrast, acquired cutis laxa often has a triggering event such as urticaria, drugs (such as penicillin) or neoplasms. Acquired cutis laxa may also be immunologically mediated, as it can involve dermal deposit of immunoglobulins and it can occur with autoimmune diseases. Acquired cutis laxa has been associated with granular immunoglobulin A deposits as well as abundant neutrophils. One hypothesis for the cause is excessive elastase release from neutrophils and macrophages. It has also been considered that mutations in elastin (ELN) and fibulin-5 (FBLN5) genes can increase susceptibility of elastic fibres to inflammatory degradation in acquired cutis laxa.

Acquired cutis laxa has also been seen in conjunction with a number of conditions including: rheumatoid arthritis, systemic lupus erythematosus, celiac disease, and monoclonal gammopathies. It can also occur as a postinflammatory response after urticaria. Urticarial skin fibroblasts have shown a 2- to 3- fold increase in elastase activity in a patient with acquired cutis laxa.

== Treatment ==
As of 2024, there is no treatment for cutis laxa. Procedures aimed at mitigating symptoms and identifying subsequent conditions are often advised. No pharmacological agent has been able to stop the progression of the disease. However, cosmetic surgeries are potentially an option as cutis laxa does not generally involve vascular fragility.

== See also ==
- Occipital horn syndrome
- List of cutaneous conditions
- Lipodystrophy
