= Wrinkly skin syndrome =

- Specialty: Dermatology
- Symptoms: sagging, wrinkled skin; low skin elasticity, delayed fontanelle (soft spot) closure
- Causes: mutations in the ATP6VOA2 gene (autosomal recessive)
- Diagnostic method: dermatological assessment, genetic screening, skin biopsies, x-rays, brain MRI scans
- Management: physical therapy, developmental assessments, bone density scans
- Frequency: 30 known cases

Wrinkly skin syndrome (WSS) is a rare genetic condition characterized by sagging, wrinkled skin, low skin elasticity, and delayed fontanelle (soft spot) closure, along with a range of other symptoms. The disorder exhibits an autosomal recessive inheritance pattern with mutations in the ATP6V0A2 gene, leading to abnormal glycosylation events. There are only about 30 known cases of WSS as of 2010. Given its rarity and symptom overlap with other dermatological conditions, reaching an accurate diagnosis is difficult and requires specialized dermatological testing. Limited treatment options are available but long-term prognosis is variable from patient to patient, based on individual case studies. Some skin symptoms recede with increasing age, while progressive neurological advancement of the disorder causes seizures and mental deterioration later in life for some patients.

== Symptoms and signs ==
The predominant clinical symptoms of wrinkly skin syndrome are wrinkled and inelastic skin over the face, backs of hands/fingers, tops of feet, and abdomen; delayed closure of the fontanelle (baby's soft spot), and increased palmar and plantar creases in the hands and feet, respectively.

Patients may experience a wide variety of symptoms (see table). The assortment and severity of symptoms displayed (particularly growth and developmental delays) vary from patient to patient.

Symptom	Additional description
Excessive wrinkled skin	
Delayed growth & motor development	
Cognitive impairment	
Hernias	
Musculoskeletal and connective tissue abnormalities	Hip dislocation, loose joints, scoliosis
Broad nasal tip	
Microcephaly	Small infant head size
Short stature	Sub-average height
Low-set ears	
Smooth philtrum	Flat upper lip groove
Hypertelorism	Wide-set eyes
Infantile muscular hypotonia	Low infant muscle tone
Pectus excavatum	Caved-in chest
High myopia	Severe near-sightedness
Cryptorchidism	Undescended testes
Epicanthus	Prominent Eye folds
Deep plantar and palmar creases	Deep palm and sole of feet creases
Dental underdevelopment	Small teeth, delayed eruption, high palate, cavities
Nasal voice	
Sparse hair	Reduced Hair Density
Prominent nasolabial folds	Deep smile lines
Intrauterine growth retardation	Very low fetal weight
Down-slanted palpebral fissures	Downward eye slant
Osteoporosis	Brittle, weak bones

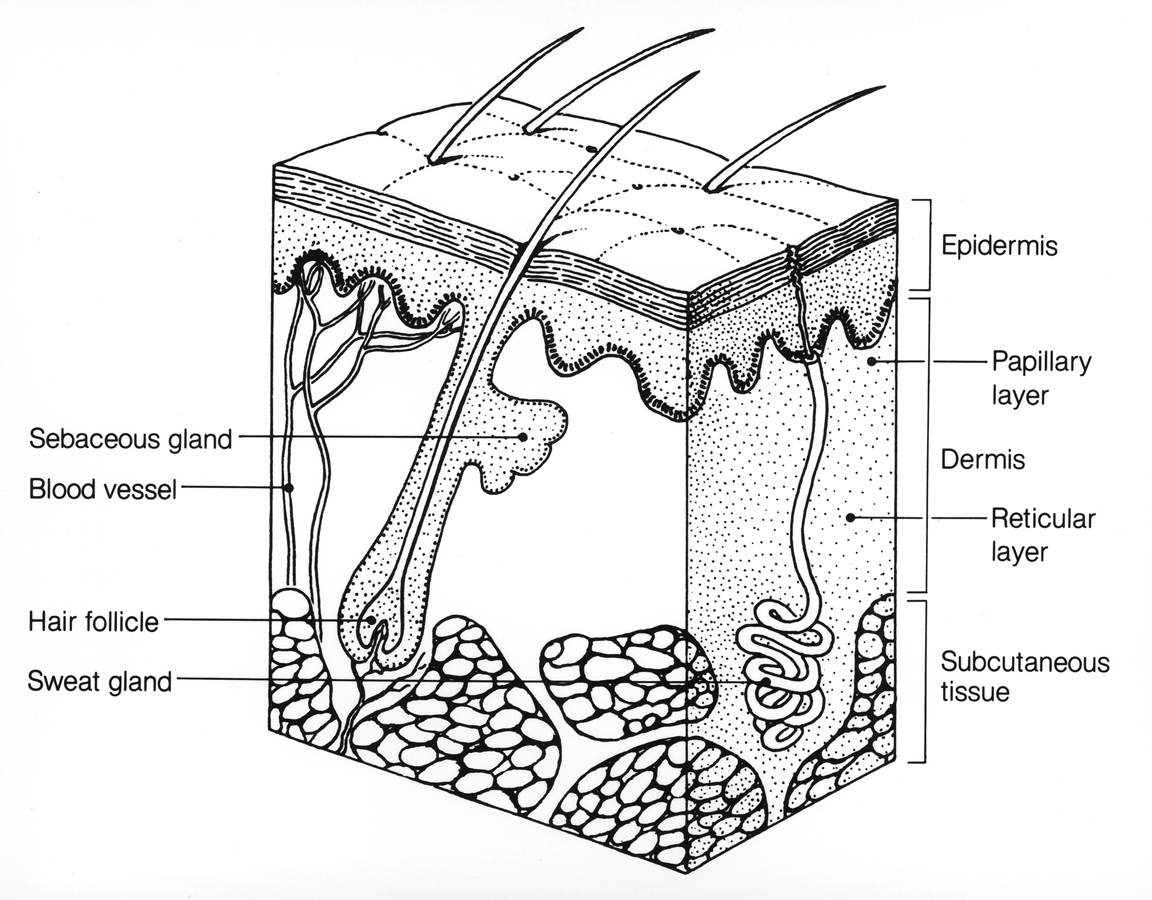
Layers of the skin. WSS affects the papillary and reticular dermis.

Microscopic analysis of epidermal samples of a four-month-old with WSS revealed an irregular pattern of elastic fiber distribution. Fewer elastic fibers are present in the papillary dermis and fragmented elastic fibers in the reticular dermis are observed. Epidermal samples from the same patient subjected to electron microscopy revealed that elastin fibers display abnormally high levels of fragmentation and clumping of microfibrils, with little amorphous elastin. Within collagen bundles, collagen fibrils are of irregular shape and thickness. These disruptions of the connective tissue play a role in the elasticity of the skin and wrinkling.

== Mechanism ==
=== Importance of the ATP6V0A2 pump ===
Vacuolar ATPases (V-ATPase) regulate the pH of the subcellular compartments found within the endosomal membrane system. V-ATPases are multiprotein complexes composed of two functional domains, a V0 domain, and a V1 domain. The V1 domain catalyzes the hydrolysis of ATP to power the pumping of protons through the V0 channel, which spans the lipid bilayer of endosomal compartments. Vacuolar ATPases are also localized within the plasma membrane of both renal cells and osteoclasts. In osteoclasts, V-ATPases are required for pumping protons onto the bone surface. The protons are then used for bone resorption. In renal cells, V-ATPases are used to pump protons into the urine. This facilitates bicarbonate reabsorption into the blood. The ATP6V0A2 gene encodes the a2 isoform of the a-subunit (present in the V0 domain). The a2 subunit anchors the V-ATPase to the membrane, and it is also directly involved with proton transport. ATP6V0A2 is encoded by the ATP6V0A2 gene. The ATP6V0A2 pump is found in virtually all cells and is thought to play an important role in the process of vesicular fusion in the secretory pathway, including the secretion of extracellular matrix components.

=== Function of the Golgi apparatus in protein maturation ===
The most important subcellular structure in the context of wrinkly skin syndrome (WSS), is the Golgi apparatus. The Golgi apparatus is an important part of the endomembrane system because it processes proteins and lipids prior to their delivery to the plasma membrane and/or secretion into the extracellular environment. The Golgi is organized into a polarized series of membrane-bound stacks, called cisternae, through which proteins are trafficked in sequence once they leave the endoplasmic reticulum (ER), where the proteins and lipids are synthesized. Proteins destined for secretion or delivery to the plasma membrane arrive first at the cis-Golgi, before being trafficked through the medial and trans-Golgi. In the Golgi, proteins undergo extensive post-translational modifications (PTMs). In the context of WSS, the most significant PTM events are the glycosylation of proteins comprising the extracellular matrix (ECM) of epidermal cells. The two types of glycosylation events in the Golgi are N-linked glycosylation and O-linked glycosylation. Glycosylation of proteins destined for secretion occurs through the forward movement of proteins throughout the Golgi apparatus. The proteins destined for secretion are then trafficked to the plasma membrane in secretory vesicles. Retrograde (backward) transport in the Golgi apparatus is also important. To retain the enzymes responsible for protein glycosylation in the correct regions of the Golgi, there must be retrograde transport of these enzymes back into the Golgi apparatus. In addition, retrograde transport serves a quality control function, by shuttling misfolded proteins back into the ER or retaining them within the Golgi itself until proper protein folding and maturation is completed. The activity of protein-modifying enzymes, like glycosyltransferases and glycosidases, relies on the lumenal pH of the Golgi apparatus. Cisternal pH becomes increasingly acidic (lower pH) with progression from cis- to trans- regions of the Golgi. Disruption of decreasing pH can impart significant effects on the efficiency and sequence of glycosylation events. Maintenance of the pH gradient across the Golgi is instrumental for proper post-translational modification of proteins before secretion. Retrograde transport and pH regulation are therefore vital to the proper functioning of the Golgi apparatus.

=== Genetic causes of WSS ===
Patients with both missense and/or nonsense mutations of the ATP6V0A2 gene have been shown to phenotypically express wrinkly skin syndrome (WSS) or autosomal recessive cutis laxa type II (ARCL II) (another cutis laxa disorder). Some consider WSS to be a milder variant of ARCL II, but the genetic causes of WSS are not yet known. A large number of patients with WSS and ARCL II show a loss of function in the a2-subunit. These mutations in ATP6V0A2 are associated with defective glycan biosynthesis and defective Golgi apparatus structure. However, the exact mechanism of how mutations in the ATP6V0A2 gene lead to these effects is unclear.

=== Aberrant Golgi functioning and clinical symptoms of WSS ===
WSS is characterized by defects in the elastic fiber system that comprises the extracellular matrix of epidermal cells. The skin's elastic fiber system consists of elastin (which is normally non-glycosylated) and glycosylated proteins (fibulin, fibronectin, and collagen). It is speculated that either abnormal glycosylation and/or impaired secretion of proteins caused by ATP6V0A2 dysfunction lead to WSS. The ATP6V0A2 pump is highly expressed within the Golgi apparatus. ATP6V0A2 is primarily found within the medial-Golgi and the trans-Golgi. ATP6V0A2 acidifies the medial- and trans-Golgi so that their resident enzymes (e.g. glycosidases and glycosyltransferases) function properly. Therefore, mutations in the ATP6V0A2 gene reduce the ability of ATP6V0A2 to produce the necessary pH gradient for these glycosylation enzymes, which results in abnormal N- and O-linked glycosylation. Because the physical properties of skin rely heavily on the structural proteins of the elastic fiber system of epidermal cells, abnormal glycosylation can lead to structural defects in the elastic fibers, and therefore lead to the inelastic skin seen in WSS. WSS patients may also have defective secretion of another ECM component of the skin called tropoelastin. The process of secreting tropoelastin from the cell is dependent on the acidic pH of vesicles. It is thought that increased pH levels (lower acidity) lead to the premature aggregation (coacervation) of tropoelastin inside the vesicle. The process of coacervation is thought to be essential for proper elastin assembly in the ECM. Coacervation must occur outside of the cell within the ECM (the ECM has a more alkaline environment than the vesicle) for proper elastic fiber assembly. However, defective ATP6V0A2 pumps in the vesicle increase the lumenal pH of the vesicle, leading to premature coacervation and defective elastic fiber assembly. The abnormal assembly and glycosylation of proteins used to make elastic fibers explains the connective tissue phenotypes associated with ARCL2 and WSS but does not explain the neurodevelopmental disorders or growth defects of these patients (18). Elastin is not required for brain or bone growth. However, it is believed that abnormal/impaired secretion of the brain and bone-specific ECM proteins caused by dysregulation of Golgi acidification is what leads to the neural and skeletal defects in ARCL2.

== Diagnosis ==
Accurate diagnosis of wrinkly skin syndrome generally requires specialized dermatological assessment. In addition to assessment of clinical physical symptoms, diagnosis may be aided by:

- X-rays to identify joint abnormalities
- ophthalmologic evaluation of hypertelorism, down slanting eyes, and myopia
- brain MRI scans to evaluate the degree of microcephaly
- genetic screening for congenital disorders of glycosylation (CDG)
- skin biopsy and histological analysis
- genetic screening for mutations in the ATP6VOA2 gene

The pigmentation patterns observed in skin biopsies reveal a characteristic lack of elastic fibers in the papillary dermis and clumping of elastic fibers in the reticular dermis. Despite assessment of each of these diagnostic factors, a definitive diagnosis differentiating WSS from cutis laxa requires genetic testing.

=== Differential diagnosis ===
Several symptoms are shared with cutis laxa type II (CLT2) including wrinkling of skin, microcephaly, and developmental delay which has made proper diagnosis difficult in several cases. However, the severity of skin abnormalities and facial dysmorphia is greater in cutis laxa type II.

== Management ==
While there is no corrective cure for the disease, some symptoms can be managed therapeutically and/or monitored. Therapeutic treatment options include physical therapy to improve muscular development while patient growth and osteoporosis can be monitored via developmental assessments and bone density scans, respectively.

== Prognosis ==
Long-term progression of this disorder varies between patients. Due to therapeutic interventions for developmental symptoms, long-term outcomes are improved by diagnosis of the disorder during childhood. In some cases, dermatological symptoms subside while associated neurological symptoms may worsen with age, including frequency of seizures and mental deterioration.

== Epidemiology ==
As of January 2020, only ~ 30 cases of wrinkly skin syndrome have been reported. The majority of reported cases have come from Middle Eastern regions such as Iraq, Saudi Arabia, and Oman. Both males and females of Middle Eastern descent have been reported to be affected. Consanguineous (marriage of first-cousins) relationships are a prevalent feature of parents with children diagnosed with WSS. Such marriages and relationships are more common in Middle Eastern regions. Multiple children of the same parents have also been reported to be affected by WSS. There is currently insufficient epidemiological data to provide frequency of WSS occurrence in other ethnic groups.

== History ==
Wrinkly skin syndrome is a very rare disease that was amenable to molecular diagnosis only recently. Consequently, the history of this disease has been minimally documented. However, in 1973, "wrinkly skin syndrome" received its name because of its characterized features of exceedingly wrinkled skin in the hands and feet in a number of related patients. In the same year, WSS was established as a new heritable disorder of connective tissue that appeared to be transmitted as an . In 1993, WSS was diagnosed in a mother and her son. Both patients displayed decreased elastic recoil of the skin and an increase in the number of palmar creases. In 1999, there were up to nine reported cases of WSS. In 2008, Kornak et al. investigated glycosylation of serum proteins with individuals with WSS and found that they had defects in N-glycosylation at the level of the Golgi apparatus.

== See also ==
- Ehlers–Danlos syndrome
- Cutis laxa Type II
- List of cutaneous conditions
