= TMEM269 =

Human gene and protein

Identifiers
- Aliases: TMEM269, transmembrane protein 269
- External IDs: MGI: 1922430; GeneCards: TMEM269

Gene location (Human)
| Chr. | Chromosome 1 (human) |
| Band | 1p34.2 | Start | 42,784,991 bp |
| Band | 1p34.2 | End | 42,816,619 bp |

Gene location (Mouse)
| Chr. | Chromosome 4 (mouse) |
| Band | 4|4 D2.1 | Start | 119,062,252 bp |
| Band | 4|4 D2.1 | End | 119,075,414 bp |
RNA expression pattern
| Bgee | Human / Mouse (ortholog); Top expressed in: thymus; testicle; gonad; ganglionic eminence; Achilles tendon; right testis; cerebellar hemisphere; left testis; right hemisphere of cerebellum; monocyte / Top expressed in: testicle; embryo; spermatid; quadriceps femoris muscle; lens; spermatocyte; muscle of thigh; muscle tissue; zone of skin; cerebellar cortex; More reference expression data |
| BioGPS | n/a |
Orthologs
| Databases | NCBI: entry; OMA: entry |
| Species | Human | Mouse |
| Entrez | 100129924 | 75180 |
| Ensembl | ENSG00000274386 | ENSMUSG00000028642 |
| UniProt | A0A1B0GVZ9 | Q9D4Y8 |
| RefSeq (mRNA) | NM_001242750; NM_001354602 | NM_029198 |
| RefSeq (protein) | NP_001341531 | NP_083474 |
| Location (UCSC) | Chr 1: 42.78 – 42.82 Mb | Chr 4: 119.06 – 119.08 Mb |
| PubMed search |
- Wikidata
| View/Edit Human | View/Edit Mouse |

Transmembrane Protein 269 (TMEM269) is a protein which in humans is encoded by the TMEM269 gene.

== Gene ==
The gene is located on the plus strand with a cytogenetic location of 1p34.2 and has the accession number A0A1B0GVZ9.1. The gene has a span of approximately 160,000 base pairs. It has a divergent transcript expressed on the negative strand in the opposite direction of TMEM269.

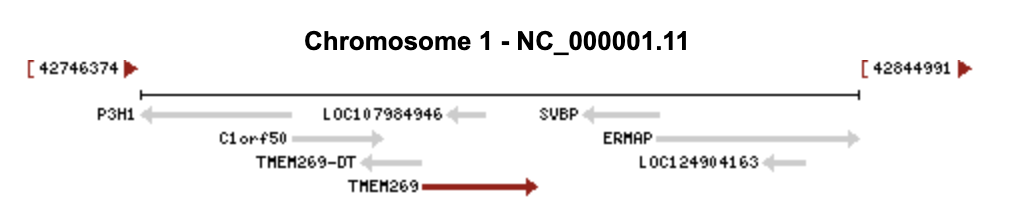

== Transcript ==
=== Rna-seq data ===
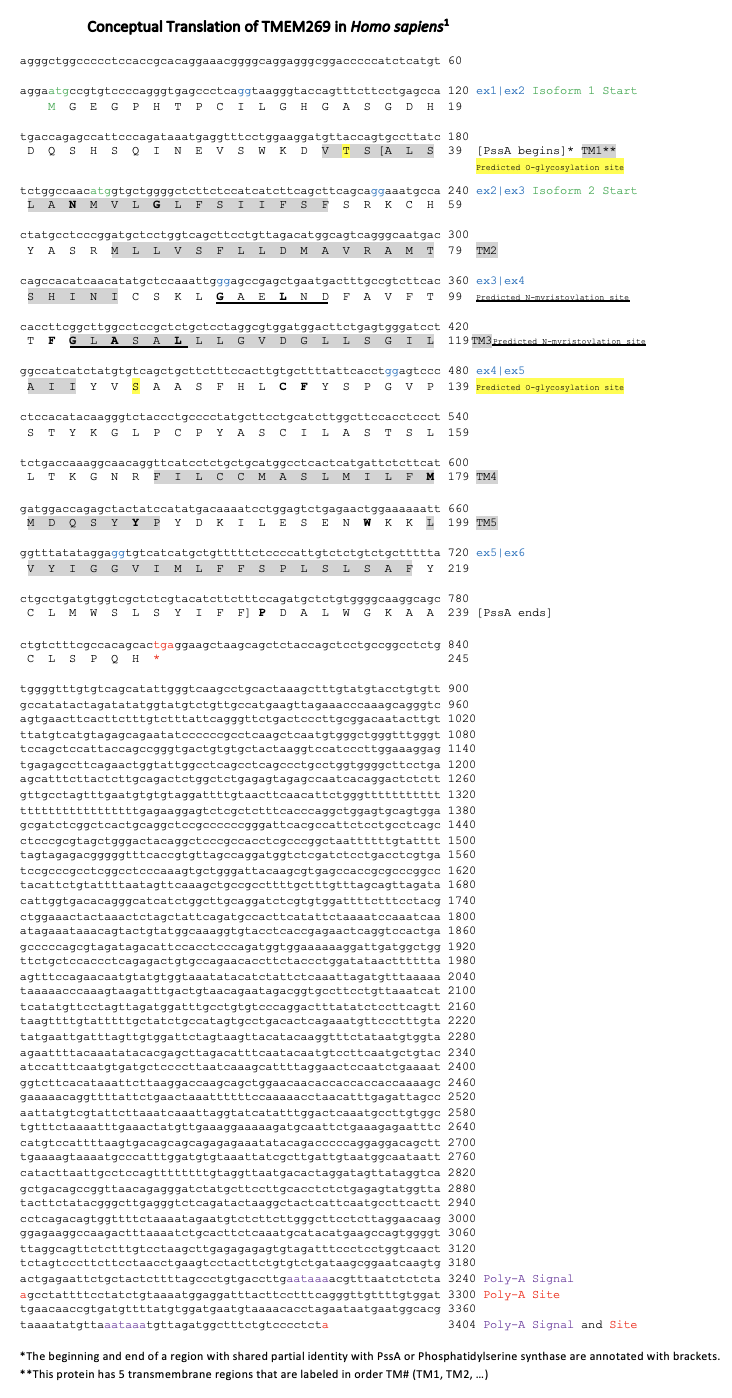
Conceptually translated and annotated transcript of TMEM269 human mRNA

A study of RNA-seq data according to tissue type in humans found the expression of TMEM269 to be highest in the testes, brain, endometrium, and kidney. The data indicates that TMEM269 is transcribed ubiquitously across tissue types at a fairly low rate with no tissue type with more than 0.4 reads per kilobase of transcript per million reads mapped. A separate study of RNA-seq data across tissue types indicated the highest expression for TMEM269 in the brain, the adrenal gland, and the testes

=== Regulation of translation ===
A study of diabetic kidney disease (DKD) in mouse models determined that miRNA-181b-5b, an miRNA that is dramatically down-regulated in DKD mice, dramatically decreased the expression of TMEM269 (-4.52 fold difference or 22.12% total original expression, p-value <0.01). A subsection of Table IIIa from the original study is included below with the values relevant to TMEM269. TMEM269 is one among 27 genes that had notably (4-fold difference) reduced expression of the genes tested; it ranked 18th for strongest effect among these genes.

TMEM269 was experimentally determined to be down-regulated by low phospholipid microdiets (Low-PL) in pelagic sole larvae when compared to high phospholipid microdiets (High-PL). TMEM269 was one among 15 identified differentially expressed transcripts according to Low-PL dietary exposure (among the group of 12 that were down-regulated).

== Protein ==
TMEM269 has two isoforms, with the more common variant being 245 amino acids in length. It has 5 transmembrane domains throughout the length of the protein and one large region similarity to the sequence of phosphatidylserine synthase. The two isoforms of TMEM269 have identical sequences apart from the second, less common, isoform having a deletion of the first 42 amino acids that are found in the first isoform's sequence.

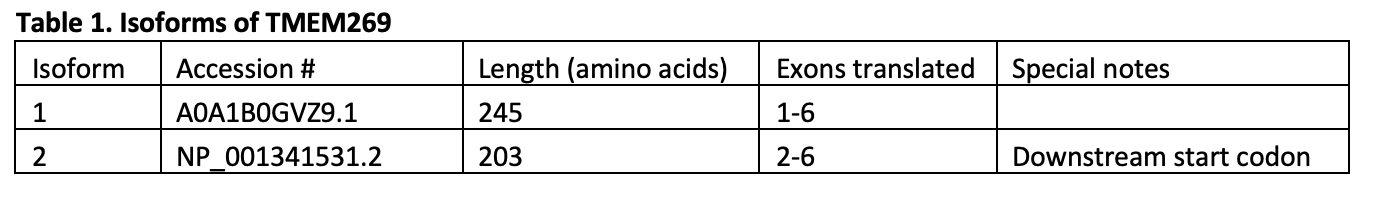

Relative to other human proteins, TMEM269 is rich in methionine, serine, phenylalanine, and leucine, while it has a low percentage of glutamic acid, glutamine, and arginine. The predicted molecular weight of TMEM269 is 26.9 kDa and the predicted isoelectric point is 6.7.

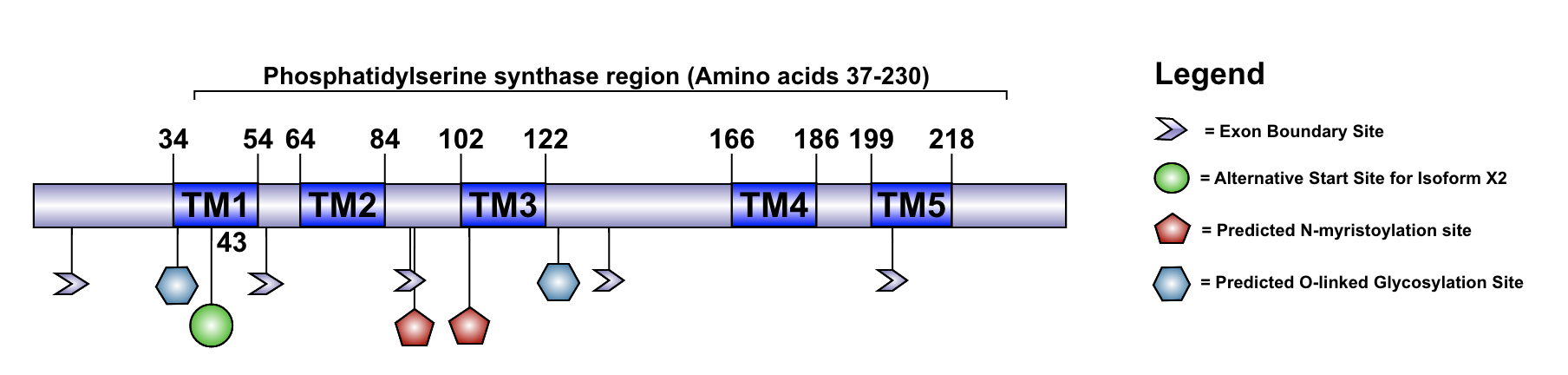

=== Post translation modifications ===
There are four predicted sites of N-myristolyation (at amino acid positions 89–94, 102–107, 113–118, 137–142) for TMEM269. N-Myristoylation may be involved in signal transduction, protein stability, and trafficking proteins to the membrane. These N-myristolyation sites are predicted in various model organisms in addition to humans including mice, chickens, and zebrafish.

There are two predicted sites of O-linked glycosylation on the TMEM269 protein; this type of modification may regulate protein conformation, stability, and multimeric protein assembly. These predictions are based on sites surpassing a 0.5 NetPhos threshold on a YinOYang post translational modification prediction algorithm These sites are located at amino acid positions 35 and 125 on the protein.

=== Subcellular localization ===
Subcellular localization predictions indicate TMEM269 has the strongest likelihood of being located in the endoplasmic reticulum and the plasma membrane. The Reinhardt's method for Cytplasmic/Nuclear discrimination predicts the human TMEM269 protein to be cytoplasmic with a reliability score of 94.1

=== Interactions ===
One study determined TMEM269 to be a candidate for non-promiscuous interaction with the protein Fam183b via yeast two-hybrid screening. Fam183b has been characterized as essential for motile cilia in Xenopus but Fam183b loss-of-function studies have yielded no defects (in cilia or otherwise) in experiments using mice. TMEM269 was one of two proteins that were identified as having potential interaction with this protein.

== Evolution ==
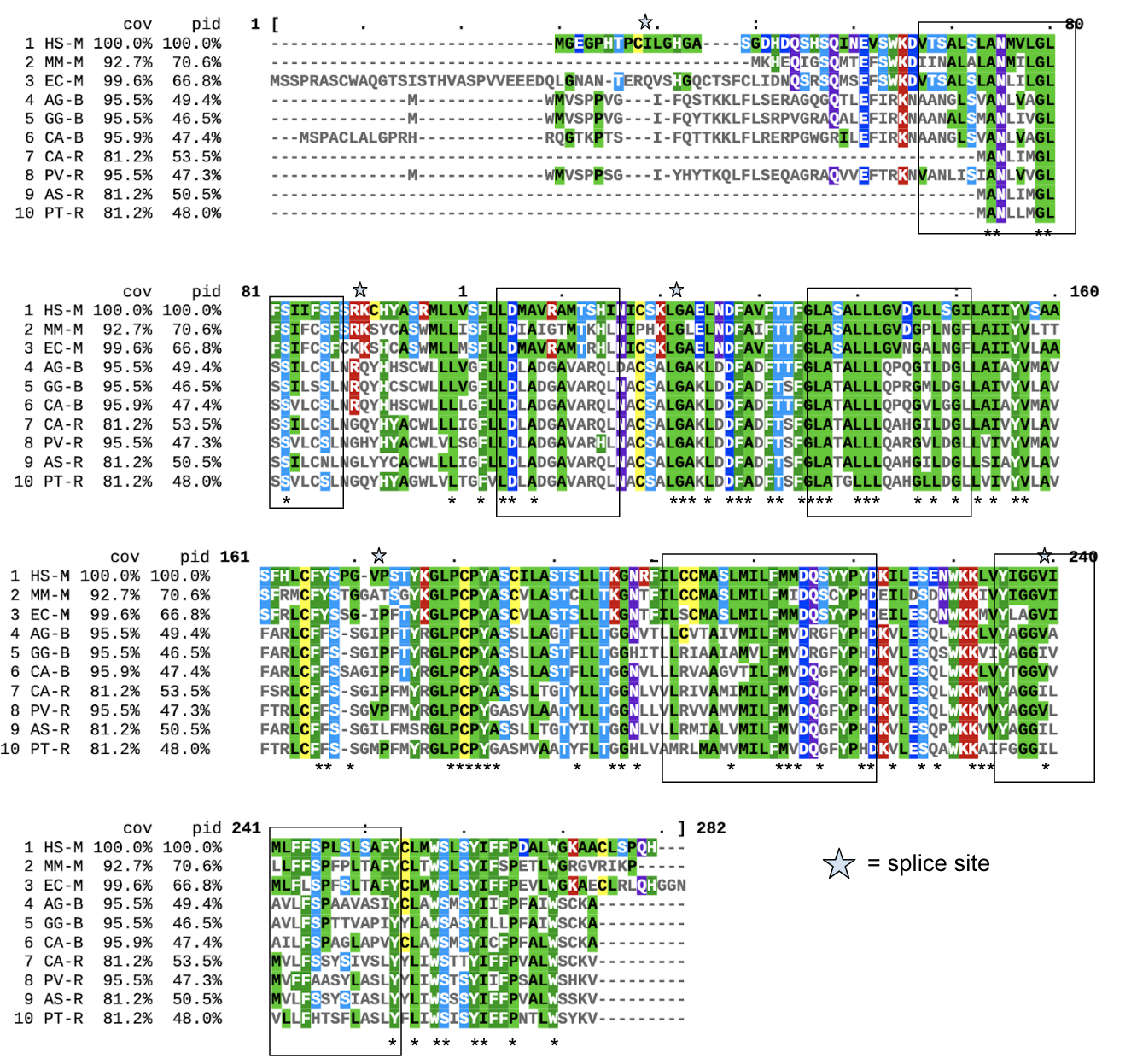
Multiple Sequence Alignment of TMEM269 Protein with Close Orthologs of Humans

TMEM269 is conserved in all jawed vertebrates but does not have orthologs in Cyclostomi, invertebrates, or non-animal life forms. Chondrichthyes or cartilaginous fish are the group of organisms that are most distantly related to humans that still have a TMEM269 ortholog. The approximate evolutionary date of divergence from Homo sapiens for most cartilaginous fish is estimated to be 464 million years ago. Based on information from sequences of the orthologs, the human version of the protein shares an amino acid identity of around 50-60% with its most distant orthologs in fish and from 70 to 98% for closer orthologs in mammals (higher percentages for more closely related groups such as primates). TMEM269 does not have any clearly identifiable paralogs.

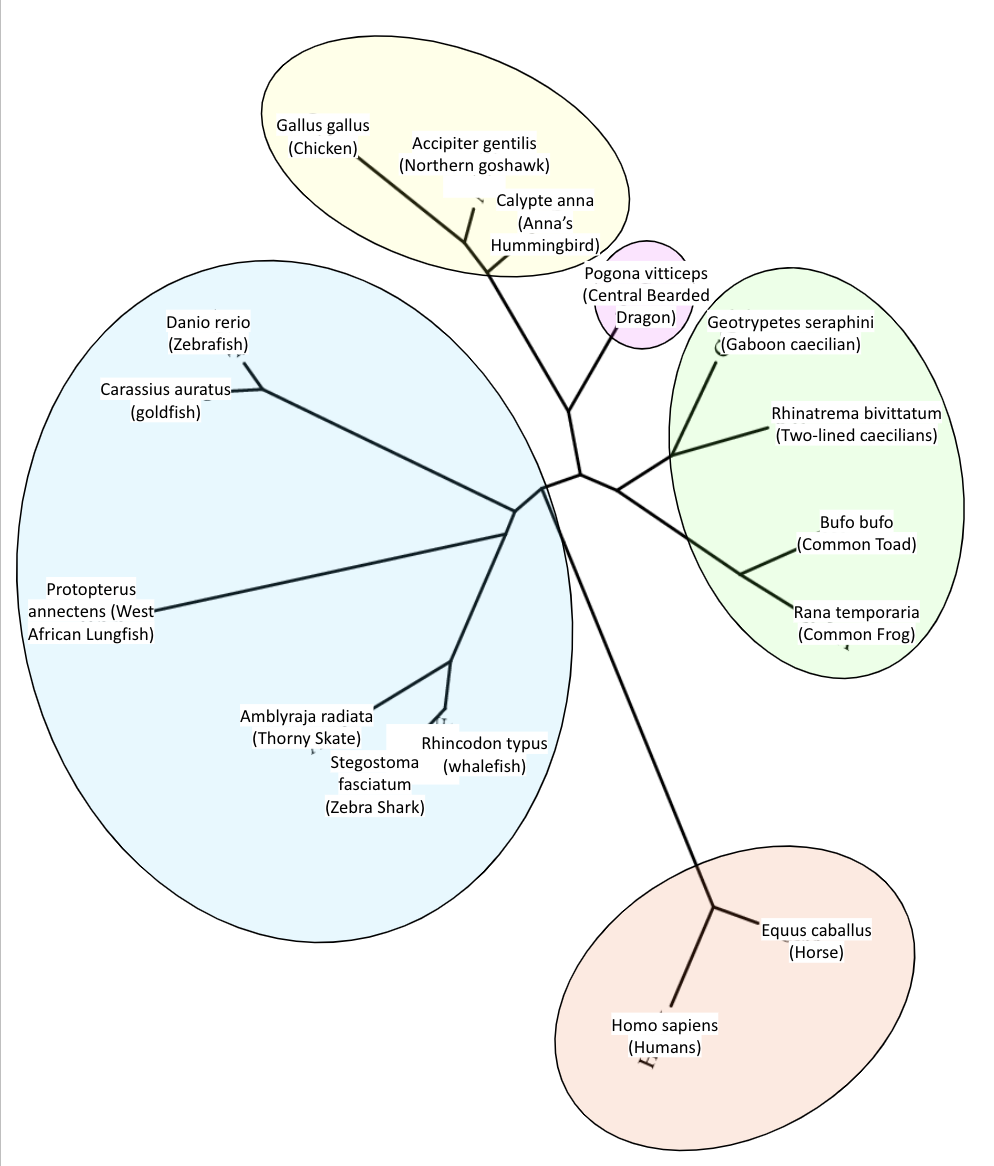

One measure of understanding the rate of evolution is determining how fast the sequence is diverging in comparison to other proteins. TMEM269 is diverging across orthologs at a moderate rate when compared to the quickly-diverging protein Fibrinogen Alpha Chain and the slowly-diverging protein Cytochrome C.

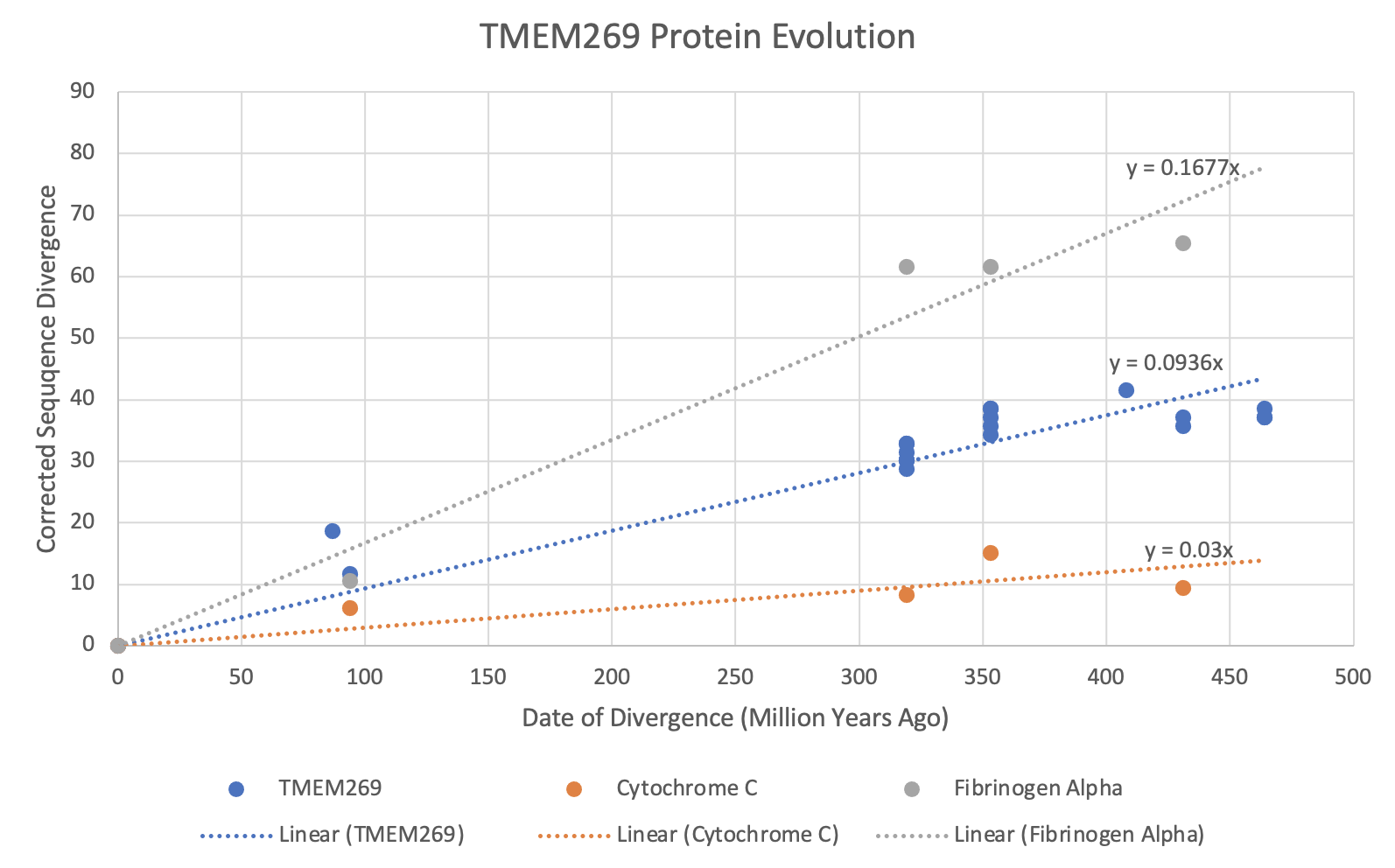
Corrected Sequence Divergence vs Estimated Date of Divergence in TMEM269, Cytochrome C, and Fibrinogen Alpha Chain.

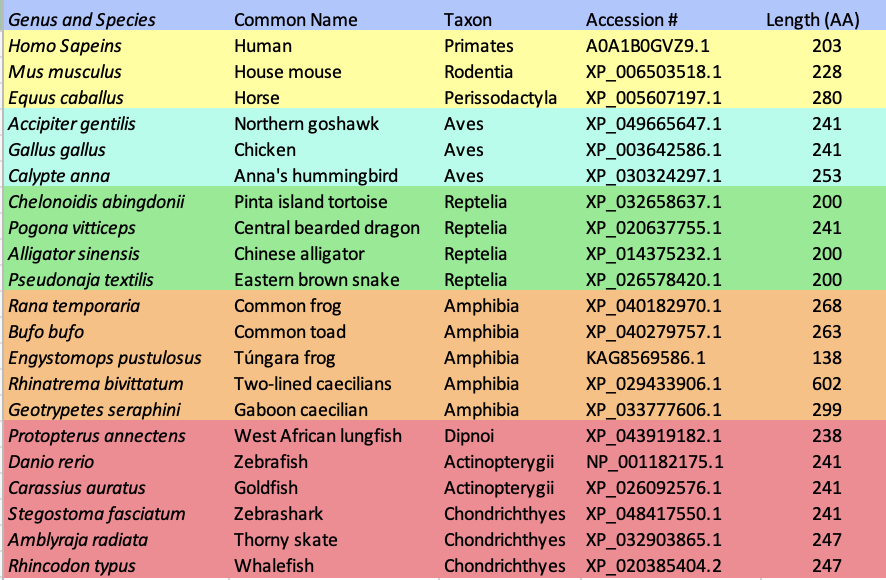
