= L-serine-phosphatidylethanolamine phosphatidyltransferase =

Identifiers
- EC no.: 2.7.8.29

Databases
- BRENDA: enzyme data
- ExPASy: NiceZyme view
- KEGG: enzyme entry
- MetaCyc: metabolic pathway
- Rhea: reactions
- PDB structures: RCSB PDB PDBe PDBsum
Search
- PMC: articles
- PubMed: articles
- NCBI: proteins

PTDSS2

Identifiers
- Aliases: PTDSS2, PSS2, phosphatidylserine synthase 2
- External IDs: OMIM: 612793; MGI: 1351664; GeneCards: PTDSS2
Enzyme activity
EC #	BRENDA	ExPASy	KEGG	MetaCyc
2.7.8.29	↗	↗	↗	↗

Gene location (Human)
Chr.	Chromosome 11 (human)
Band	11p15.5	Start	448,268 bp
Band	11p15.5	End	491,399 bp

Gene location (Mouse)
Chr.	Chromosome 7 (mouse)
Band	7|7 F5	Start	141,122,382 bp
Band	7|7 F5	End	141,157,606 bp
RNA expression pattern
Bgee	Human / Mouse (ortholog); Top expressed in: left testis; right testis; right hemisphere of cerebellum; apex of heart; right frontal lobe; right ovary; left ovary; Brodmann area 9; hippocampus proper; nucleus accumbens / Top expressed in: fetal liver hematopoietic progenitor cell; saccule; tibiofemoral joint; otic placode; seminiferous tubule; otic vesicle; internal carotid artery; external carotid artery; Epithelium of choroid plexus; olfactory epithelium; More reference expression data
BioGPS	n/a
Gene ontology
Molecular function	CDP-diacylglycerol-serine O-phosphatidyltransferase activity; transferase activity
Cellular component	endoplasmic reticulum membrane; membrane; intracellular anatomical structure; endoplasmic reticulum; integral component of membrane
Biological process	phosphatidylserine biosynthetic process; lipid metabolism; phospholipid biosynthetic process
Sources:Amigo / QuickGO
Orthologs
Databases	NCBI: entry; OMA: entry
Species	Human	Mouse
Entrez	81490	27388
Ensembl	ENSG00000282367; ENSG00000174915	ENSMUSG00000025495
UniProt	Q9BVG9	Q9Z1X2
RefSeq (mRNA)	NM_030783; NM_001329544; NM_001329545; NM_001329548	NM_013782
RefSeq (protein)	NP_001316473; NP_001316474; NP_001316477; NP_110410	NP_038810
Location (UCSC)	Chr 11: 0.45 – 0.49 Mb	Chr 7: 141.12 – 141.16 Mb
PubMed search
- Wikidata
View/Edit Human	View/Edit Mouse

L-serine-phosphatidylethanolamine phosphatidyltransferase (EC 2.7.8.29) is a type of enzyme with systematic name L-1-phosphatidylethanolamine:L-serine phosphatidyltransferase. These enzymes catalyses the following chemical reaction

L-1-phosphatidylethanolamine + L-serine $\rightleftharpoons$ L-1-phosphatidylserine + ethanolamine

This catalyzses the replacement of a polar head group of phosphatidylethanolamine with L-serine.

In humans, the primary form of this enzyme is phosphatidylserine synthase 2 which is encoded by the gene PTDSS2. Its paralog, PTDSS1, has also been found to show some of this activity in vitro, but its primary function is instead to act on phosphatidylcholine.
