= Fibulin =

Anaphylotoxin-like domain
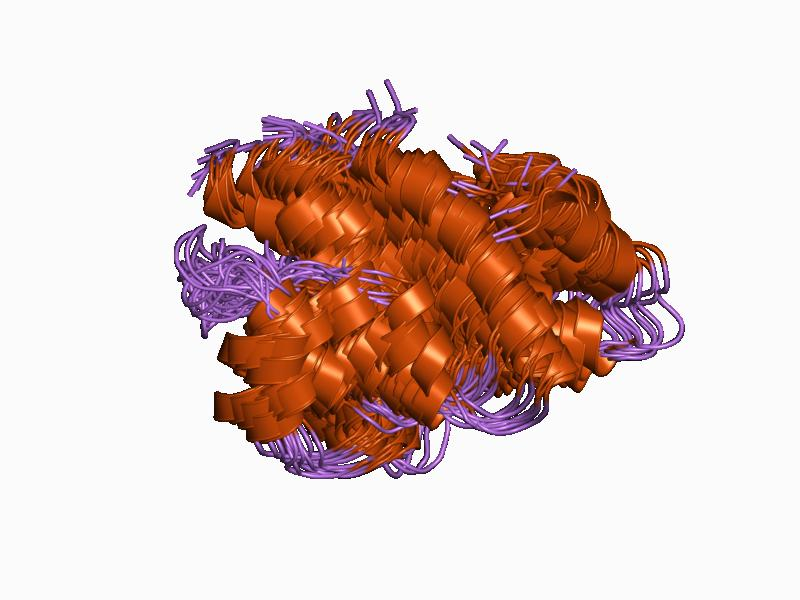
- Structure of porcine C5adesArg.

Identifiers
- Symbol: ANATO
- Pfam: PF01821
- InterPro: IPR000020
- SMART: ANATO
- PROSITE: PDOC00906
- SCOP2: 1c5a / SCOPe / SUPFAM
- CDD: cd00017
Available protein structures:
- PDB: 2a73B:693-728 1c5a :21-55 1cfaA:698-732 1kjs :698-732 IPR000020 PF01821 (ECOD; PDBsum)
- AlphaFold: IPR000020; PF01821

Fibulin (FY-beau-lin) (now known as Fibulin-1 FBLN1) is the prototypic member of a multigene family, currently with seven members. Fibulin-1 is a calcium-binding glycoprotein. In vertebrates, fibulin-1 is found in blood and extracellular matrices. In the extracellular matrix, fibulin-1 associates with basement membranes and elastic fibers. The association with these matrix structures is mediated by its ability to interact with numerous extracellular matrix constituents including fibronectin, proteoglycans, laminins and tropoelastin. In blood, fibulin-1 binds to fibrinogen and incorporates into clots.

Fibulins are secreted glycoproteins that become incorporated into a fibrillar extracellular matrix when expressed by cultured cells or added exogenously to cell monolayers. The five known members of the family share an elongated structure and many calcium-binding sites, owing to the presence of tandem arrays of epidermal growth factor-like domains. They have overlapping binding sites for several basement-membrane proteins, tropoelastin, fibrillin, fibronectin and proteoglycans, and they participate in diverse supramolecular structures. The amino-terminal domain I of fibulin consists of three anaphylatoxin-like (AT) modules, each approximately 40 residues long and containing four or six cysteines. The structure of an AT module was determined for the complement-derived anaphylatoxin C3a, and was found to be a compact alpha-helical fold that is stabilized by three disulphide bridges in the pattern Cys14, Cys25 and Cys36 (where Cys is cysteine). The bulk of the remaining portion of the fibulin molecule is a series of nine EGF-like repeats.

== Genes ==
- FBLN1, FBLN2, FBLN3, FBLN4, FBLN5, FBLN7 and HMCN1 is also known as "fibulin-6".
