= FBLN1 =

Protein-coding gene in the species Homo sapiens

Identifiers
- Aliases: FBLN1, FBLN, FIBL1, fibulin 1
- External IDs: OMIM: 135820; MGI: 95487; GeneCards: FBLN1

Gene location (Human)
| Chr. | Chromosome 22 (human) |
| Band | 22q13.31 | Start | 45,502,238 bp |
| Band | 22q13.31 | End | 45,601,135 bp |

Gene location (Mouse)
| Chr. | Chromosome 15 (mouse) |
| Band | 15|15 E2 | Start | 85,090,150 bp |
| Band | 15|15 E2 | End | 85,170,736 bp |
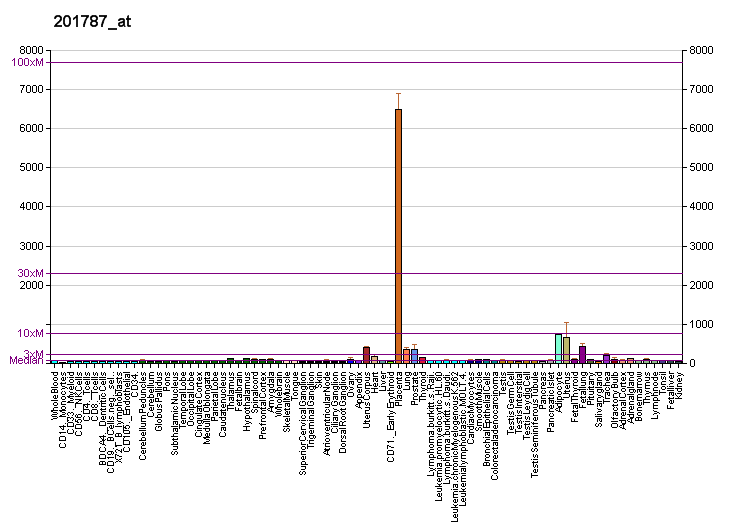

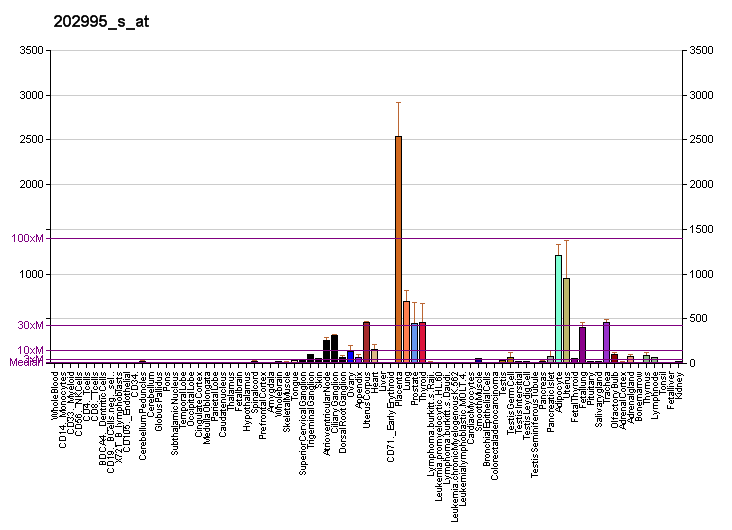

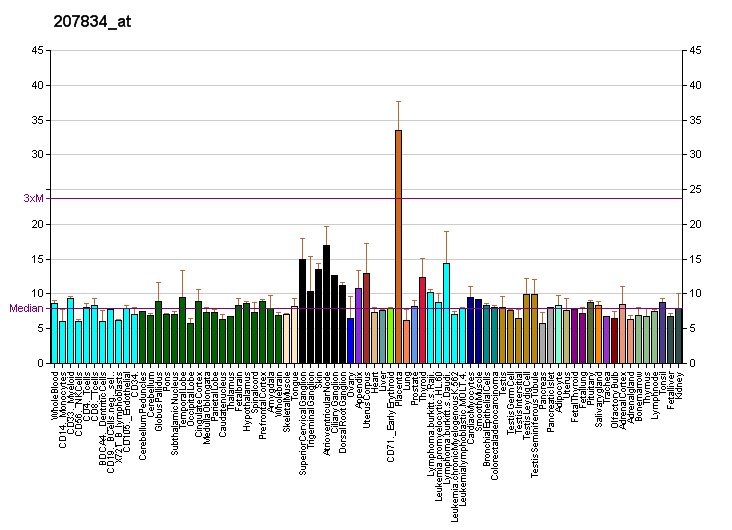
RNA expression pattern
| Bgee | Human / Mouse (ortholog); Top expressed in: canal of the cervix; gallbladder; vena cava; pericardium; gastric mucosa; ectocervix; vagina; left uterine tube; right auricle of heart; tendon of biceps brachii / Top expressed in: aortic valve; otic vesicle; ascending aorta; otic placode; ciliary body; external carotid artery; saccule; mandibular prominence; internal carotid artery; maxillary prominence; More reference expression data |
| BioGPS | More reference expression data |
Gene ontology
| Molecular function | fibronectin binding; calcium ion binding; extracellular matrix structural constituent; fibrinogen binding; integrin binding; protein C-terminus binding; protein binding; identical protein binding; peptidase activator activity; protein-containing complex binding |
| Cellular component | elastic fiber; extracellular matrix; fibrinogen complex; basement membrane; extracellular exosome; extracellular space; extracellular region; collagen-containing extracellular matrix |
| Biological process | negative regulation of protein phosphorylation; negative regulation of cell adhesion; negative regulation of stem cell proliferation; positive regulation of fibroblast proliferation; positive regulation of substrate-dependent cell migration, cell attachment to substrate; negative regulation of cell motility; negative regulation of transformation of host cell by virus; positive regulation of peptidase activity; positive regulation of gene expression; negative regulation of ERK1 and ERK2 cascade; integrin-mediated signaling pathway; blood coagulation, fibrin clot formation; negative regulation of substrate adhesion-dependent cell spreading; viral process; embryo implantation; extracellular matrix organization |
Sources:Amigo / QuickGO
Orthologs
| Databases | NCBI: entry; OMA: entry |
| Species | Human | Mouse |
| Entrez | 2192 | 14114 |
| Ensembl | ENSG00000077942 | ENSMUSG00000006369 |
| UniProt | P23142 | Q08879 |
| RefSeq (mRNA) | NM_006487; NM_001996; NM_006485; NM_006486 | NM_010180; NM_001347088 |
| RefSeq (protein) | NP_001987; NP_006476; NP_006477; NP_006478 | NP_001334017; NP_034310 |
| Location (UCSC) | Chr 22: 45.5 – 45.6 Mb | Chr 15: 85.09 – 85.17 Mb |
| PubMed search |
- Wikidata
| View/Edit Human | View/Edit Mouse |

FBLN1 is the gene encoding fibulin-1, an extracellular matrix and plasma protein.

== Function ==
Fibulin-1 is a secreted glycoprotein that is found in association with extracellular matrix structures including fibronectin-containing fibers, elastin-containing fibers and basement membranes. Fibulin-1 binds to a number of extracellular matrix constituents including fibronectin, nidogen-1, and the proteoglycan, versican. Fibulin-1 is also a blood protein capable of binding to fibrinogen.

== Structure ==
Fibulin-1 has modular domain structure and includes a series of nine epidermal growth factor-like modules followed by a fibulin-type module, a module found in all members of the fibulin gene family.

The human fibulin-1 gene, FBLN1, encodes four splice variants designated fibulin-1A, B, C and D, which differ in their carboxy terminal regions. In mouse, chicken and the nematode, C. elegans, only two fibulin-1 variants are produced, fibulin-1C and fibulin-1D.

== Interactions ==
FBLN1 has been shown to interact with:

- NOV/CCN3,
- amyloid precursor protein,
- entactin,
- fibrinogen, and
- fibronectin.

== See also ==
- Synpolydactyly
