= Lenz–Majewski syndrome =

Medical condition

- Other names: Lenz–Majewski hyperostotic dwarfism (LMHD)
- This condition is inherited in an autosomal dominant manner.
- Specialty: Medical genetics
- Frequency: 0.0001%

Lenz–Majewski syndrome (LMS), also known as Lenz–Majewski hyperostotic dwarfism (LMHD), is a skin condition characterized by hyperostosis, craniodiaphyseal dysplasia, dwarfism, cutis laxa, proximal symphalangism, syndactyly, brachydactyly, intellectual disability, enamel hypoplasia and hypertelorism.

== Genetics ==
In 2013, whole-exome sequencing showed that a missense mutation resulting in overactive phosphatidylserine synthase 1 was the cause of LMS, making it the first known human disease to be caused by disrupted phosphatidylserine metabolism. The researchers suggested a link between the condition and bone metabolism.

== See also ==
- Skin lesion
