= Nidogen =

Nidogens, formerly known as entactins, are a family of sulfated monomeric glycoproteins located in the basal lamina of parahoxozoans. Two nidogens have been identified in humans: nidogen-1 (NID1) and nidogen-2 (NID2). Remarkably, vertebrates are still capable of stabilizing basement membrane in the absence of either identified nidogen. In contrast, those lacking both nidogen-1 and nidogen-2 typically die prematurely during embryonic development as a result of defects existing in the heart and lungs. Nidogen have been shown to play a crucial role during organogenesis in late embryonic development, particularly in cardiac and lung development. Insufficient levels of nidogen in mice causes poorly developed organs such as the lungs and heart, which ultimately ensues to an early death. Due to nidogen being necessary in the formation of basement membranes, serving as a linker protein, and those basement proteins being shown to be necessary during tissue growth, nidogen is crucial for embryonic development. From an evolutionary perspective, nidogens are highly conserved across vertebrates and invertebrates, retaining their ability to bind laminin.

In nematodes, nidogen-1 is necessary for axon guidance, but not for basement membrane assembly.
