= Nidogen-1 =

Protein found in humans

NID1
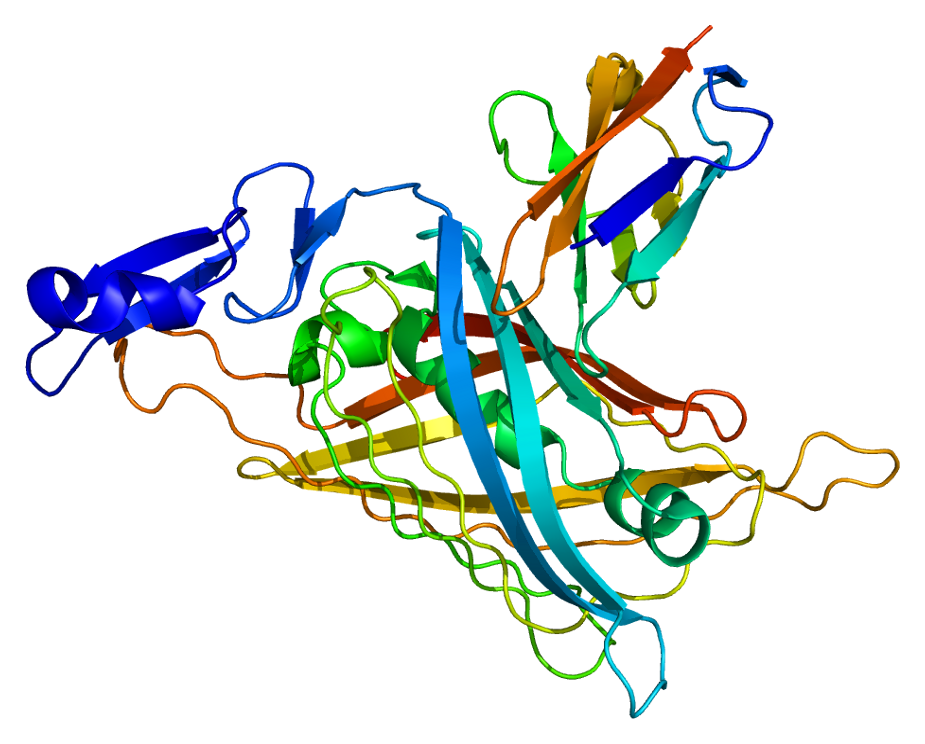

Identifiers
- Aliases: NID1, NID, nidogen 1, entactin
- External IDs: OMIM: 131390; MGI: 97342; GeneCards: NID1
Available structures
PDB	Ortholog search: PDBe RCSB
PDB	List of PDB id codes 1NDX

Gene location (Human)
Chr.	Chromosome 1 (human)
Band	1q42.3	Start	235,975,830 bp
Band	1q42.3	End	236,065,109 bp

Gene location (Mouse)
Chr.	Chromosome 13 (mouse)
Band	13 A1|13 5.26 cM	Start	13,612,136 bp
Band	13 A1|13 5.26 cM	End	13,686,854 bp
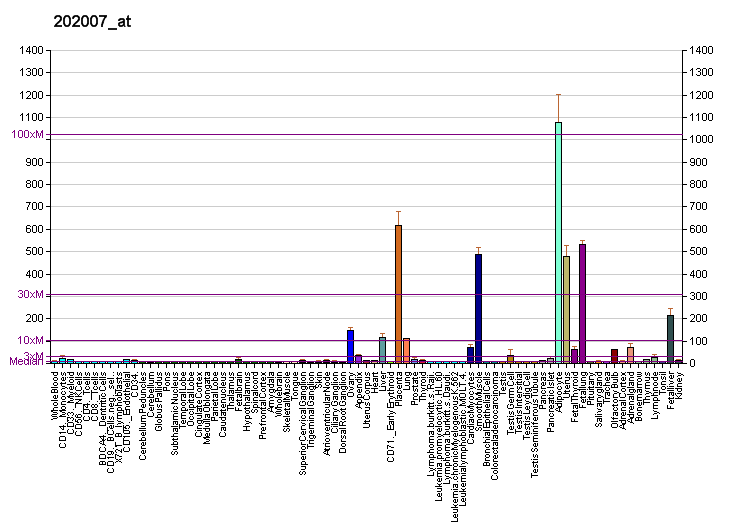

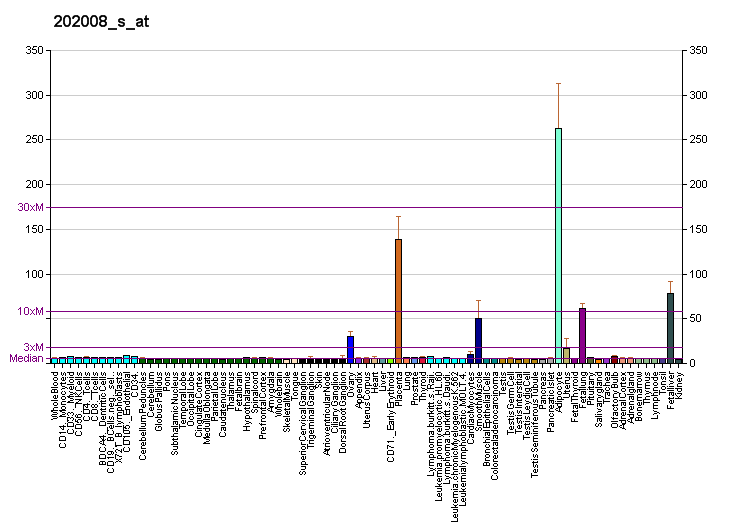
RNA expression pattern
Bgee	Human / Mouse (ortholog); Top expressed in: stromal cell of endometrium; gastric mucosa; lower lobe of lung; left uterine tube; right lung; pericardium; pylorus; canal of the cervix; placenta; subcutaneous adipose tissue / Top expressed in: endothelial cell of lymphatic vessel; epithelium of lens; epididymis; external carotid artery; internal carotid artery; efferent ductule; left lung lobe; trophoblast cell; Gonadal ridge; dermis; More reference expression data
BioGPS	More reference expression data
Gene ontology
Molecular function	laminin-1 binding; calcium ion binding; laminin binding; collagen binding; extracellular matrix binding; proteoglycan binding; extracellular matrix structural constituent
Cellular component	extracellular matrix; extracellular region; basement membrane; extracellular exosome; cell periphery; extracellular space; collagen-containing extracellular matrix
Biological process	cell-matrix adhesion; extracellular matrix disassembly; extracellular matrix organization; cell adhesion; glomerular basement membrane development; basement membrane organization; positive regulation of cell-substrate adhesion
Sources:Amigo / QuickGO
Orthologs
Databases	NCBI: entry; OMA: entry
Species	Human	Mouse
Entrez	4811	18073
Ensembl	ENSG00000116962	ENSMUSG00000005397
UniProt	P14543	P10493
RefSeq (mRNA)	NM_002508	NM_010917
RefSeq (protein)	NP_002499	NP_035047
Location (UCSC)	Chr 1: 235.98 – 236.07 Mb	Chr 13: 13.61 – 13.69 Mb
PubMed search
- Wikidata
View/Edit Human	View/Edit Mouse

Nidogen-1 (NID-1), formerly known as entactin, is a protein that in humans is encoded by the NID1 gene. Both nidogen-1 and nidogen-2 are essential components of the basement membrane alongside other components such as type IV collagen, proteoglycans (heparan sulfate and glycosaminoglycans), laminin and fibronectin.

== Function ==
Nidogen-1 is a member of the nidogen family of basement membrane glycoproteins. The protein interacts with several other components of basement membranes. Structurally it (along with perlecan) connects the networks formed by collagens and laminins to each other. It may also play a role in cell interactions with the extracellular matrix.

== Clinical significance ==
Mutations in NID1 cause autosomal dominant Dandy–Walker malformation with occipital encephalocele (ADDWOC).

== Interactions ==
Nidogen-1 has been shown to interact with FBLN1.
