= Nidogen-2 =

Protein-coding gene in the species Homo sapiens

NID2

Identifiers
- Aliases: NID2, NID-2, nidogen 2
- External IDs: OMIM: 605399; MGI: 1298229; HomoloGene: 40575; GeneCards: NID2; OMA:NID2 - orthologs

Gene location (Human)
Chr.	Chromosome 14 (human)
Band	14q22.1	Start	52,004,809 bp
Band	14q22.1	End	52,069,059 bp

Gene location (Mouse)
Chr.	Chromosome 14 (mouse)
Band	14|14 A3	Start	19,801,333 bp
Band	14|14 A3	End	19,861,855 bp
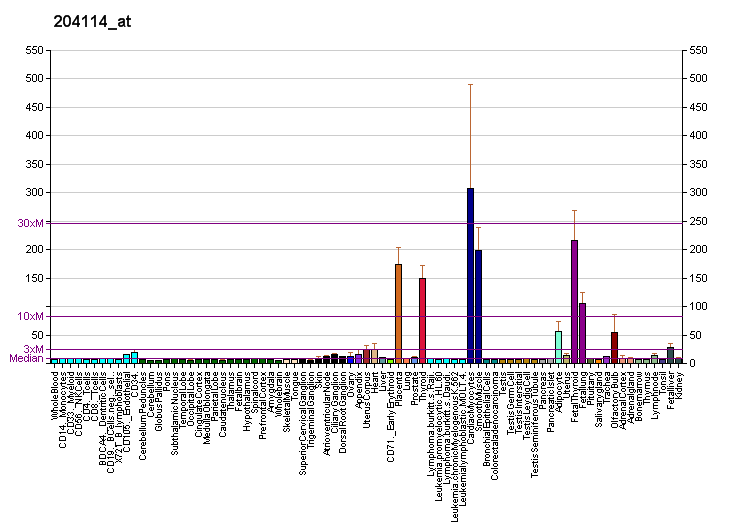
RNA expression pattern
Bgee	Human / Mouse (ortholog); Top expressed in: cartilage tissue; stromal cell of endometrium; tibia; right lobe of thyroid gland; left lobe of thyroid gland; decidua; parietal pleura; secondary oocyte; tibial nerve; right ovary / Top expressed in: tail of embryo; yolk sac; genital tubercle; dermis; endocardial cushion; efferent ductule; calvaria; stroma of bone marrow; epiblast; abdominal wall; More reference expression data
BioGPS	More reference expression data
Gene ontology
Molecular function	calcium ion binding; protein binding; collagen binding; extracellular matrix structural constituent
Cellular component	extracellular matrix; extracellular region; basement membrane; extracellular exosome; extracellular space; plasma membrane; collagen-containing extracellular matrix
Biological process	cell adhesion; cell-matrix adhesion; extracellular matrix organization; basement membrane organization
Sources:Amigo / QuickGO
Orthologs
Species	Human	Mouse
Entrez	22795	18074
Ensembl	ENSG00000087303	ENSMUSG00000021806
UniProt	Q14112	O88322
RefSeq (mRNA)	NM_007361	NM_008695
RefSeq (protein)	NP_031387	NP_032721
Location (UCSC)	Chr 14: 52 – 52.07 Mb	Chr 14: 19.8 – 19.86 Mb
PubMed search
- Wikidata
View/Edit Human	View/Edit Mouse

Nidogen-2, also known as osteonidogen, is a basal lamina protein of the nidogen family. It was the second nidogen to be described after nidogen-1 (entactin). Both play key roles during late embryonic development. In humans it is encoded by the NID2 gene.
