= FBLN2 =

Protein-coding gene in the species Homo sapiens

Identifiers
- Aliases: FBLN2, fibulin 2
- External IDs: OMIM: 135821; MGI: 95488; GeneCards: FBLN2

Gene location (Human)
Chr.	Chromosome 3 (human)
Band	3p25.1	Start	13,549,125 bp
Band	3p25.1	End	13,638,422 bp

Gene location (Mouse)
Chr.	Chromosome 6 (mouse)
Band	6 D1|6 40.42 cM	Start	91,189,437 bp
Band	6 D1|6 40.42 cM	End	91,249,522 bp
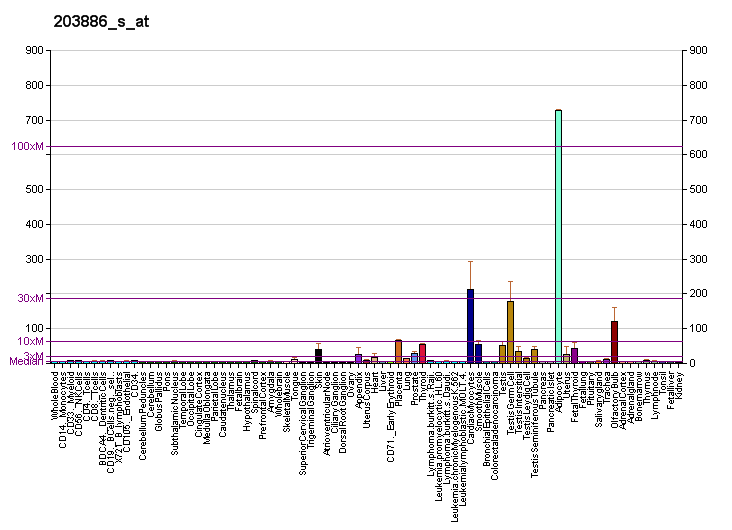
RNA expression pattern
Bgee	Human / Mouse (ortholog); Top expressed in: right auricle of heart; right coronary artery; subcutaneous adipose tissue; abdominal fat; left coronary artery; apex of heart; vena cava; saphenous vein; pericardium; tibial nerve / Top expressed in: stroma of bone marrow; umbilical cord; external carotid artery; internal carotid artery; ankle joint; decidua; efferent ductule; plantaris muscle; lactiferous gland; endothelial cell of lymphatic vessel; More reference expression data
BioGPS	More reference expression data
Gene ontology
Molecular function	calcium ion binding; extracellular matrix structural constituent; extracellular matrix binding; extracellular matrix constituent conferring elasticity
Cellular component	extracellular matrix; extracellular vesicle; extracellular exosome; extracellular space; extracellular region; collagen-containing extracellular matrix
Biological process	positive regulation of cell-substrate adhesion; extracellular matrix organization
Sources:Amigo / QuickGO
Orthologs
Databases	NCBI: entry; OMA: entry
Species	Human	Mouse
Entrez	2199	14115
Ensembl	ENSG00000163520	ENSMUSG00000064080
UniProt	P98095	P37889
RefSeq (mRNA)	NM_001004019; NM_001165035; NM_001998	NM_001081437; NM_007992
RefSeq (protein)	NP_001004019; NP_001158507; NP_001989	NP_001074906; NP_032018
Location (UCSC)	Chr 3: 13.55 – 13.64 Mb	Chr 6: 91.19 – 91.25 Mb
PubMed search
- Wikidata
View/Edit Human	View/Edit Mouse

Fibulin-2 is a protein that in humans is encoded by the FBLN2 gene.

This gene encodes an extracellular matrix protein, which belongs to the fibulin family. This protein binds various extracellular ligands and calcium. It may play a role during organ development, in particular, during the differentiation of heart, skeletal and neuronal structures. Alternatively spliced transcript variants encoding different isoforms have been identified.

Its role as a biomarker for meningiomas (a common tumour affecting the central nervous system) was recently described where a blood test can predict whether patients have a grade II meningiomas (poor outcome) and not a grade I meningioma (better outcome), without the need for a surgical biopsy.

== Interactions ==
FBLN2 has been shown to interact with Laminin, alpha 1, Laminin, alpha 5 and Perlecan.
