= Calcium-binding EGF domain =

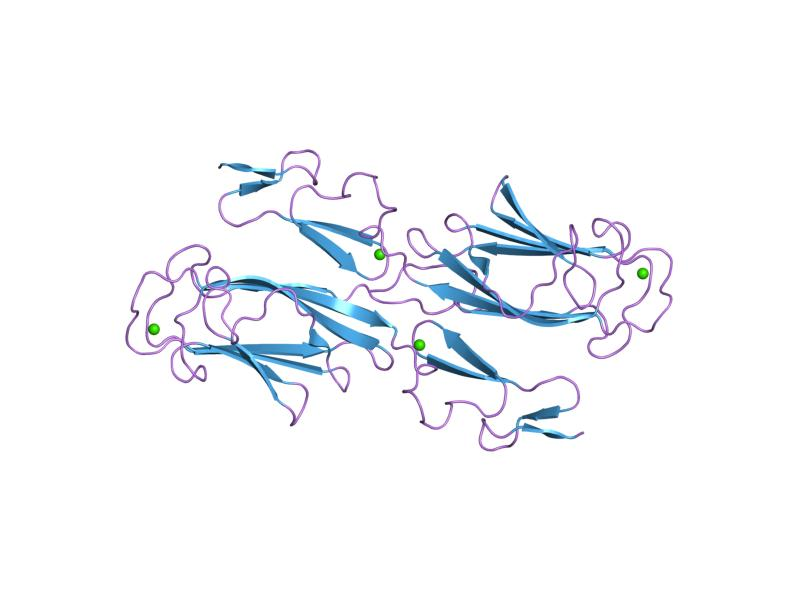
- crystal structure of the human mbl-associated protein 19 (map19)

Identifiers
- Symbol: EGF_CA
- Pfam: PF07645
- Pfam clan: CL0001
- InterPro: IPR013091
- CDD: cd00054
Available protein structures:
- Pfam: structures / ECOD
- PDB: RCSB PDB; PDBe; PDBj
- PDBsum: structure summary

In molecular biology, the calcium-binding EGF domain is an EGF-like domain of about forty amino-acid residues found in epidermal growth factor (EGF). This domain is present in a large number of membrane-bound and extracellular, mostly animal, proteins. Many of these proteins require calcium for their biological function and a calcium-binding site has been found at the N-terminus of some EGF-like domains. Calcium-binding may be crucial for numerous protein-protein interactions.

For human coagulation factor IX it has been shown that the calcium-ligands form a pentagonal bipyramid. The first, third and fourth conserved negatively charged or polar residues are side chain ligands. The latter is possibly hydroxylated. A conserved aromatic residue, as well as the second conserved negative residue, are thought to be involved in stabilising the calcium-binding site.

As in non-calcium binding EGF-like domains, there are six conserved cysteines and the structure of both types is very similar as calcium-binding induces only strictly local structural changes.
