= ATP6V0A2 =

Protein-coding gene in humans

Identifiers
- Aliases: ATP6V0A2, A2, ARCL, ARCL2A, ATP6A2, ATP6N1D, J6B7, RTF, STV1, TJ6, TJ6M, TJ6S, VPH1, WSS, ATPase H+ transporting V0 subunit a2
- External IDs: OMIM: 611716; MGI: 104855; GeneCards: ATP6V0A2
Available structures
PDB	Ortholog search: PDBe RCSB
PDB	List of PDB id codes 2LX4

Gene location (Human)
Chr.	Chromosome 12 (human)
Band	12q24.31	Start	123,712,318 bp
Band	12q24.31	End	123,761,755 bp

Gene location (Mouse)
Chr.	Chromosome 5 (mouse)
Band	5|5 F	Start	124,766,641 bp
Band	5|5 F	End	124,801,519 bp
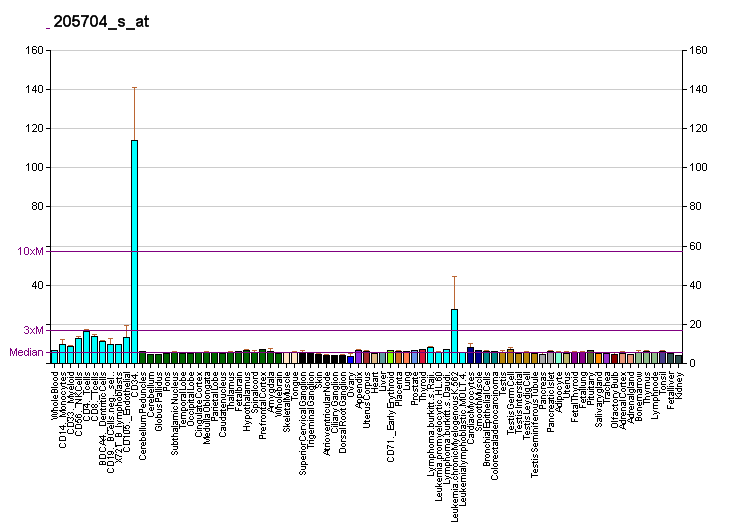
RNA expression pattern
Bgee	Human / Mouse (ortholog); Top expressed in: skin of leg; sural nerve; stromal cell of endometrium; skin of abdomen; gonad; endothelial cell; body of stomach; gastric mucosa; monocyte; minor salivary glands / Top expressed in: choroid plexus of fourth ventricle; secondary oocyte; intestinal villus; jejunum; crypt of lieberkuhn of small intestine; entorhinal cortex; perirhinal cortex; duodenum; lactiferous gland; Ileal epithelium; More reference expression data
BioGPS	More reference expression data
Gene ontology
Molecular function	ATPase binding; proton-transporting ATPase activity, rotational mechanism; protein binding; proton transmembrane transporter activity
Cellular component	integral component of membrane; endosome; proton-transporting V-type ATPase, V0 domain; phagocytic vesicle membrane; membrane; vacuolar proton-transporting V-type ATPase, V0 domain; lysosomal membrane; acrosomal vesicle; vacuolar proton-transporting V-type ATPase complex; endosome membrane; plasma membrane; intracellular organelle; perinuclear region of cytoplasm
Biological process	insulin receptor signaling pathway; transferrin transport; vacuolar proton-transporting V-type ATPase complex assembly; ion transport; vacuolar acidification; ion transmembrane transport; immune response; ATP synthesis coupled proton transport; regulation of macroautophagy; phagosome acidification; cellular iron ion homeostasis; cellular response to increased oxygen levels; transport
Sources:Amigo / QuickGO
Orthologs
Databases	NCBI: entry; OMA: entry
Species	Human	Mouse
Entrez	23545	21871
Ensembl	ENSG00000185344	ENSMUSG00000038023
UniProt	Q9Y487	P15920
RefSeq (mRNA)	NM_012463	NM_011596
RefSeq (protein)	NP_036595	NP_035726
Location (UCSC)	Chr 12: 123.71 – 123.76 Mb	Chr 5: 124.77 – 124.8 Mb
PubMed search
- Wikidata
View/Edit Human	View/Edit Mouse

V-type proton ATPase 116 kDa subunit a isoform 2, also known as V-ATPase 116 kDa isoform a2, is an enzyme that in humans is encoded by the ATP6V0A2 gene.

== Function ==
V-ATPase 116 kDa isoform a2 is a subunit of the vacuolar ATPase (v-ATPase), an heteromultimeric enzyme that is present in intracellular vesicles and in the plasma membrane of specialized cells, and which is essential for the acidification of diverse cellular components. V-ATPase consists of a membrane peripheral V(1) domain for ATP hydrolysis, and an integral membrane V(0) domain for proton translocation. The subunit encoded by this gene is a component of the V(0) domain.

== Clinical significance ==
Mutations in this gene are a cause of both Cutis laxa type II and Wrinkly skin syndrome.
