= FBLN5 =

Protein-coding gene in the species Homo sapiens

Identifiers
- Aliases: FBLN5, ADCL2, ARCL1A, ARMD3, DANCE, EVEC, FIBL-5, UP50, HNARMD, fibulin 5, CMT1H
- External IDs: OMIM: 604580; MGI: 1346091; GeneCards: FBLN5

Gene location (Human)
Chr.	Chromosome 14 (human)
Band	14q32.12	Start	91,869,411 bp
Band	14q32.12	End	91,947,987 bp

Gene location (Mouse)
Chr.	Chromosome 12 (mouse)
Band	12|12 E	Start	101,712,824 bp
Band	12|12 E	End	101,785,314 bp
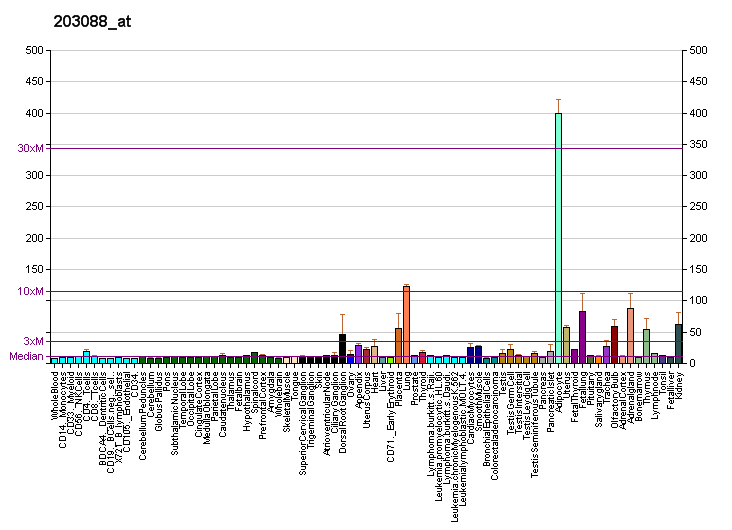
RNA expression pattern
Bgee	Human / Mouse (ortholog); Top expressed in: thoracic aorta; ascending aorta; Descending thoracic aorta; right lung; right coronary artery; stromal cell of endometrium; left coronary artery; gallbladder; popliteal artery; tibial arteries / Top expressed in: external carotid artery; ascending aorta; tunica media of zone of aorta; internal carotid artery; semi-lunar valve; umbilical cord; stroma of bone marrow; aortic valve; left lung lobe; sciatic nerve; More reference expression data
BioGPS	More reference expression data
Gene ontology
Molecular function	protein C-terminus binding; calcium ion binding; protein homodimerization activity; protein binding; integrin binding; extracellular matrix constituent conferring elasticity
Cellular component	extracellular exosome; extracellular matrix; elastic fiber; extracellular space; extracellular region; collagen-containing extracellular matrix
Biological process	secretion; regulation of cell growth; regulation of removal of superoxide radicals; cell-matrix adhesion; extracellular matrix organization; protein localization to cell surface; cell adhesion; elastic fiber assembly
Sources:Amigo / QuickGO
Orthologs
Databases	NCBI: entry; OMA: entry
Species	Human	Mouse
Entrez	10516	23876
Ensembl	ENSG00000140092	ENSMUSG00000021186
UniProt	Q9UBX5	Q9WVH9
RefSeq (mRNA)	NM_006329; NM_001384158; NM_001384159; NM_001384160; NM_001384161 NM_001384162	NM_011812; NM_001361987
RefSeq (protein)	NP_006320; NP_001371087; NP_001371088; NP_001371089; NP_001371090 NP_001371091	NP_035942; NP_001348916
Location (UCSC)	Chr 14: 91.87 – 91.95 Mb	Chr 12: 101.71 – 101.79 Mb
PubMed search
- Wikidata
View/Edit Human	View/Edit Mouse

Fibulin-5 (also known as DANCE (developmental arteries and neural crest epidermal growth factor (EGF)-like)) is a protein that in humans is encoded by the FBLN5 gene.

== Function ==
The protein encoded by this gene is a secreted, extracellular matrix protein containing an Arg-Gly-Asp (RGD) motif and calcium-binding EGF-like domains. It promotes adhesion of endothelial cells through interaction of integrins and the RGD motif. It is prominently expressed in developing arteries but less so in adult vessels. However, its expression is reinduced in balloon-injured vessels and atherosclerotic lesions, notably in intimal vascular smooth muscle cells and endothelial cells. Therefore, the protein encoded by this gene may play a role in vascular development and remodeling.

== Interactions ==
FBLN5 has been shown to interact with LOXL1 and apolipoprotein(a).

== Clinical relevance ==
FBLN5 mutations have been described in patients with age-related macular degeneration, as well as being involved in Charcot-Marie-Tooth neuropathies.
