= EFEMP2 =

Protein-coding gene in the species Homo sapiens

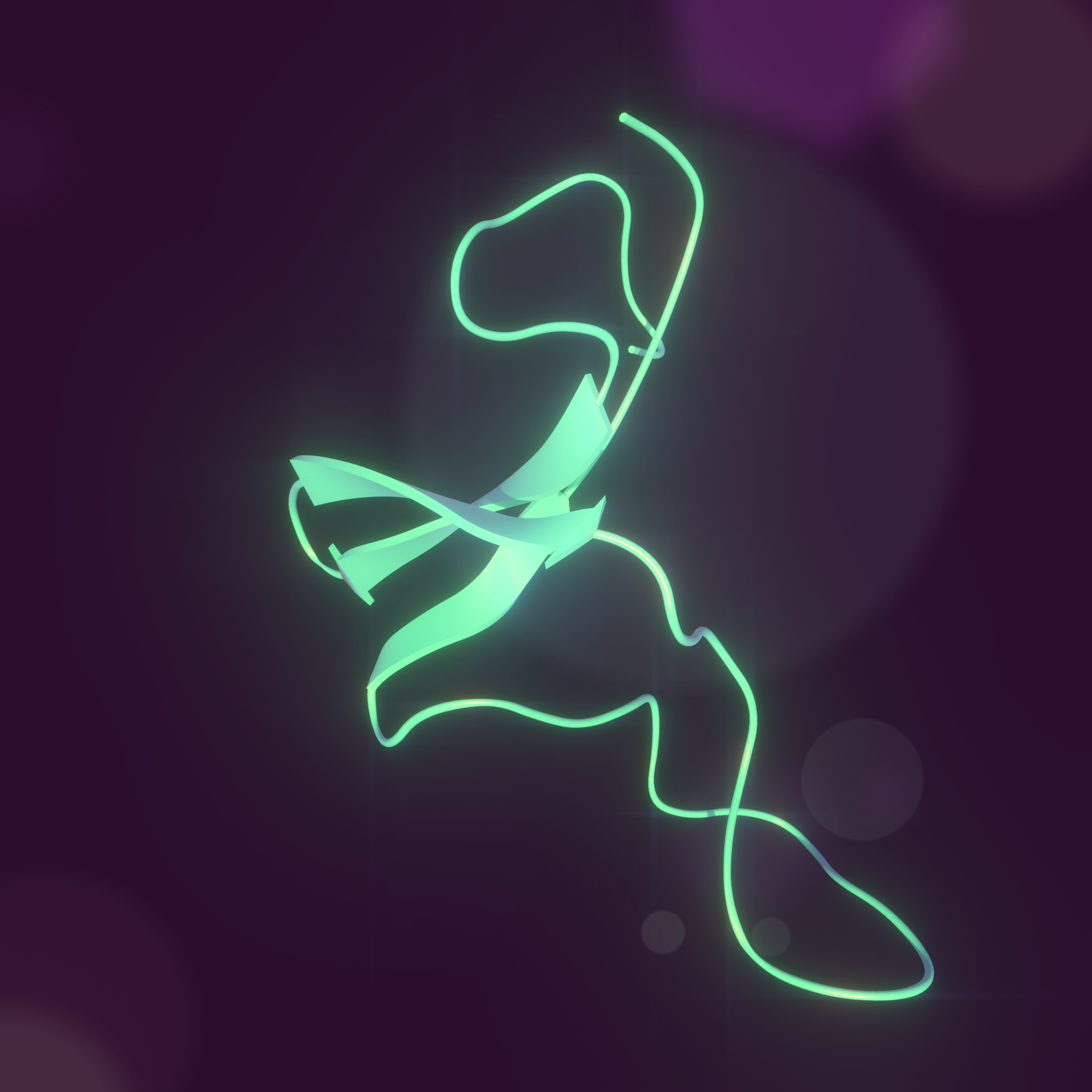

Identifiers
- Aliases: EFEMP2, ARCL1B, FBLN4, MBP1, UPH1, EGF containing fibulin like extracellular matrix protein 2, EGF containing fibulin extracellular matrix protein 2
- External IDs: OMIM: 604633; MGI: 1891209; GeneCards: EFEMP2
Available structures
PDB	Ortholog search: PDBe RCSB
PDB	List of PDB id codes 2KL7

Gene location (Mouse)
Chr.	Chromosome 19 (mouse)
Band	19|19 A	Start	5,523,982 bp
Band	19|19 A	End	5,532,545 bp
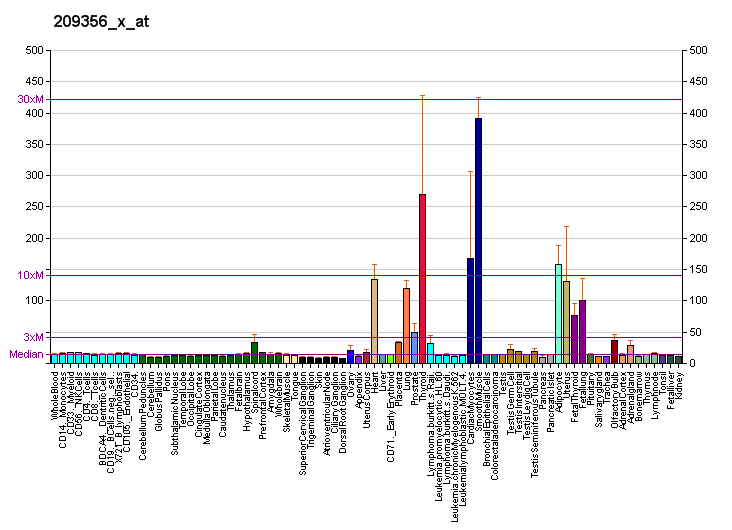

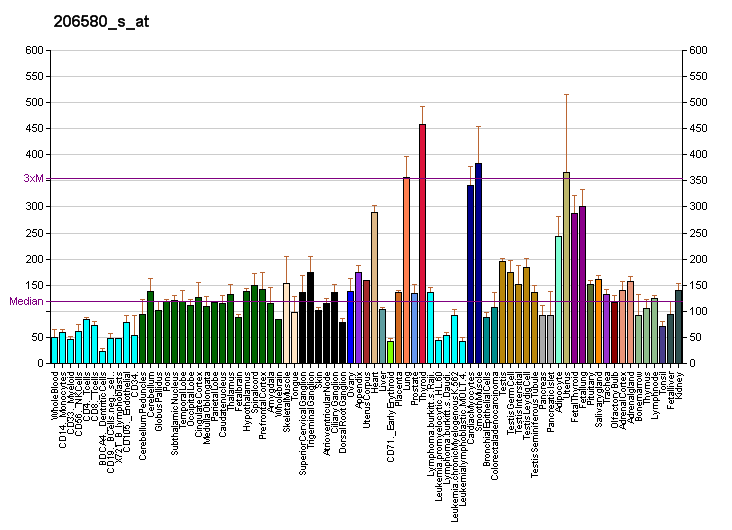
RNA expression pattern
Bgee	Human / Mouse (ortholog); Top expressed in: stromal cell of endometrium; ascending aorta; right coronary artery; left coronary artery; canal of the cervix; left uterine tube; popliteal artery; myometrium; left lobe of thyroid gland; gastric mucosa / Top expressed in: calvaria; stroma of bone marrow; molar; dermis; decidua; external carotid artery; internal carotid artery; ascending aorta; umbilical cord; efferent ductule; More reference expression data
BioGPS	More reference expression data
Gene ontology
Molecular function	calcium ion binding; extracellular matrix structural constituent; protein binding
Cellular component	extracellular vesicle; extracellular region; basement membrane; extracellular exosome; extracellular space; collagen-containing extracellular matrix
Biological process	elastic fiber assembly
Sources:Amigo / QuickGO
Orthologs
Databases	NCBI: entry
Species	Human	Mouse
Entrez	30008	58859
Ensembl	n/a	ENSMUSG00000024909
UniProt	O95967	Q9WVJ9
RefSeq (mRNA)	NM_016938	NM_001164352; NM_021474; NM_001374680
RefSeq (protein)	NP_058634	NP_001157824; NP_067449; NP_001361609
Location (UCSC)	n/a	Chr 19: 5.52 – 5.53 Mb
PubMed search
- Wikidata
View/Edit Human	View/Edit Mouse

EGF-containing fibulin-like extracellular matrix protein 2 is a protein that in humans is encoded by the EFEMP2 gene.

A large number of extracellular matrix proteins have been found to contain variations of the epidermal growth factor (EGF) domain and have been implicated in functions as diverse as blood coagulation, activation of complement and determination of cell fate during development. EFEMP2 (also known as fibulin-4) contains four EGF2 domains and six calcium-binding EGF2 domains. This gene is widely expressed in a range of adult and fetal tissues.

== Interactions ==
EFEMP2 has been shown to interact with P53.
