= Phosphatidylserine synthase 1 =

Protein-coding gene in the species Homo sapiens

PTDSS1

Identifiers
- Aliases: PTDSS1, LMHD, PSS1, PSSA, phosphatidylserine synthase 1
- External IDs: OMIM: 612792; MGI: 1276575; GeneCards: PTDSS1
Enzyme activity
EC #	BRENDA	ExPASy	KEGG	MetaCyc
2.7.8.29	↗	↗	↗	↗

Gene location (Human)
Chr.	Chromosome 8 (human)
Band	8q22.1	Start	96,261,902 bp
Band	8q22.1	End	96,336,995 bp

Gene location (Mouse)
Chr.	Chromosome 13 (mouse)
Band	13 B3|13 34.54 cM	Start	67,080,894 bp
Band	13 B3|13 34.54 cM	End	67,146,465 bp
RNA expression pattern
Bgee	Human / Mouse (ortholog); Top expressed in: myocardium of left ventricle; right ventricle; secondary oocyte; stromal cell of endometrium; cardiac muscle tissue of right atrium; apex of heart; right auricle of heart; white blood cell; gingival epithelium; monocyte / Top expressed in: external carotid artery; internal carotid artery; substantia nigra; epithelium of lens; ciliary body; Paneth cell; retinal pigment epithelium; vestibular membrane of cochlear duct; epithelium of stomach; jejunum; More reference expression data
BioGPS	n/a
Gene ontology
Molecular function	transferase activity
Cellular component	endoplasmic reticulum membrane; membrane; endoplasmic reticulum; integral component of membrane
Biological process	phosphatidylserine biosynthetic process; lipid metabolism; phospholipid biosynthetic process
Sources:Amigo / QuickGO
Orthologs
Databases	NCBI: entry; OMA: entry
Species	Human	Mouse
Entrez	9791	19210
Ensembl	ENSG00000156471	ENSMUSG00000021518
UniProt	P48651	Q99LH2
RefSeq (mRNA)	NM_014754; NM_001290225	NM_008959
RefSeq (protein)	NP_001277154; NP_055569	NP_032985
Location (UCSC)	Chr 8: 96.26 – 96.34 Mb	Chr 13: 67.08 – 67.15 Mb
PubMed search
- Wikidata
View/Edit Human	View/Edit Mouse

Phosphatidylserine synthase 1 is a protein that in humans is encoded by the PTDSS1 gene.

== Function ==
The protein encoded by this gene catalyzes the formation of phosphatidylserine from either phosphatidylcholine or phosphatidylethanolamine. Phosphatidylserine synthase localizes to the mitochondria-associated membrane of the endoplasmic reticulum, where it serves a structural role as well as a signaling role. Defects in this gene are a cause of Lenz-Majewski hyperostotic dwarfism. Two transcript variants encoding different isoforms have been found for this gene. [provided by RefSeq, Mar 2014].
