= MLF1 =

Protein-coding gene in the species Homo sapiens

Available structures
| PDB | Ortholog search: PDBe RCSB |
| PDB | List of PDB id codes 3UAL, 3UBW |

Identifiers
- Aliases: MLF1, myeloid leukemia factor 1
- External IDs: OMIM: 601402; MGI: 1341819; HomoloGene: 7839; GeneCards: MLF1; OMA:MLF1 - orthologs

Gene location (Human)
| Chr. | Chromosome 3 (human) |
| Band | 3q25.32 | Start | 158,571,163 bp |
| Band | 3q25.32 | End | 158,607,252 bp |

Gene location (Mouse)
| Chr. | Chromosome 3 (mouse) |
| Band | 3 E1|3 30.91 cM | Start | 67,281,430 bp |
| Band | 3 E1|3 30.91 cM | End | 67,307,336 bp |
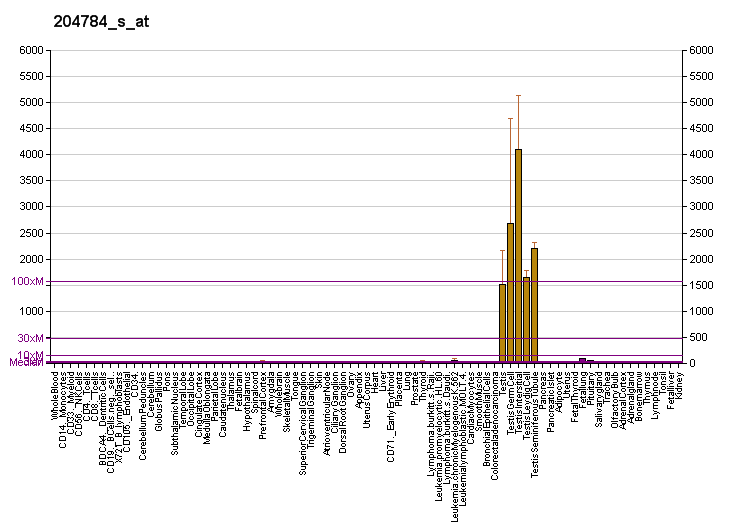

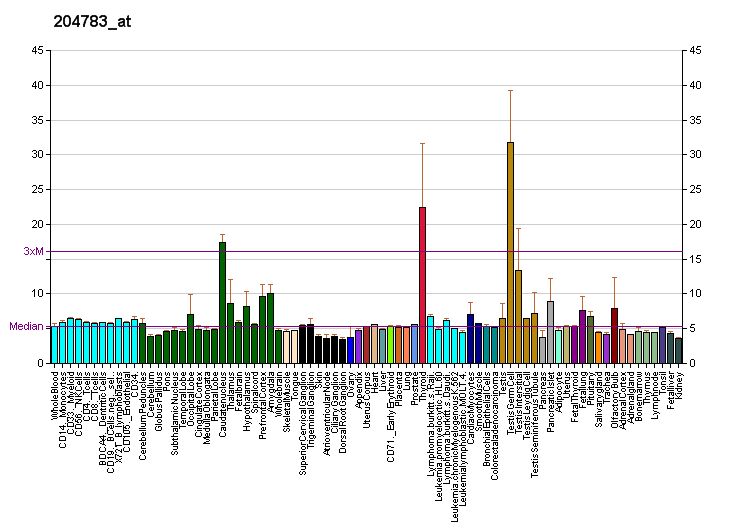
RNA expression pattern
| Bgee | Human / Mouse (ortholog); Top expressed in: left testis; sperm; right testis; bronchial epithelial cell; myocardium; cardiac muscle tissue of right atrium; right ventricle; right auricle of heart; biceps brachii; Skeletal muscle tissue of biceps brachii / Top expressed in: spermatid; triceps brachii muscle; sternocleidomastoid muscle; temporal muscle; seminiferous tubule; spermatocyte; digastric muscle; intercostal muscle; masseter muscle; quadriceps femoris muscle; More reference expression data |
| BioGPS | More reference expression data |
Gene ontology
| Molecular function | protein binding; protein domain specific binding; DNA binding |
| Cellular component | nucleus; cytoplasm; cytoskeleton; cilium; ciliary basal body; cell projection |
| Biological process | multicellular organism development; cell cycle; cell differentiation; myeloid progenitor cell differentiation; transcription, DNA-templated; regulation of transcription, DNA-templated |
Sources:Amigo / QuickGO
Orthologs
| Species | Human | Mouse |
| Entrez | 4291 | 17349 |
| Ensembl | ENSG00000178053 | ENSMUSG00000048416 |
| UniProt | P58340 | Q9QWV4 |
| RefSeq (mRNA) | NM_001130156; NM_001130157; NM_001195432; NM_001195433; NM_001195434 NM_022443; NM_001369781; NM_001369782; NM_001369783; NM_001369784; NM_001369785 | NM_001039543; NM_010801 |
| RefSeq (protein) | NP_001123628; NP_001123629; NP_001182361; NP_001182362; NP_001182363 NP_071888; NP_001356710; NP_001356711; NP_001356712; NP_001356713; NP_001356714; NP_001365774; NP_001365775; NP_001365776; NP_001365777; NP_001365779; NP_001365780; NP_001365781; NP_001365782; NP_001365784 | NP_001034632; NP_034931 |
| Location (UCSC) | Chr 3: 158.57 – 158.61 Mb | Chr 3: 67.28 – 67.31 Mb |
| PubMed search |
- Wikidata
| View/Edit Human | View/Edit Mouse |

Myeloid leukemia factor 1 is a protein that in humans is encoded by the MLF1 gene.
