= TRAPPC9 =

Protein-coding gene in the species Homo sapiens

Identifiers
- Aliases: TRAPPC9, IBP, IKBKBBP, MRT13, NIBP, TRS120, T1, trafficking protein particle complex 9, trafficking protein particle complex subunit 9
- External IDs: OMIM: 611966; MGI: 1923760; GeneCards: TRAPPC9

Gene location (Human)
Chr.	Chromosome 8 (human)
Band	8q24.3	Start	139,727,725 bp
Band	8q24.3	End	140,458,579 bp

Gene location (Mouse)
Chr.	Chromosome 15 (mouse)
Band	15|15 D3	Start	72,461,469 bp
Band	15|15 D3	End	72,933,053 bp
RNA expression pattern
Bgee	Human / Mouse (ortholog); Top expressed in: muscle of thigh; gastrocnemius muscle; apex of heart; pancreatic ductal cell; ganglionic eminence; right uterine tube; prefrontal cortex; anterior pituitary; islet of Langerhans; tendon of biceps brachii / Top expressed in: neural layer of retina; muscle of thigh; dentate gyrus of hippocampal formation granule cell; primary visual cortex; right kidney; spermatocyte; cerebellar cortex; habenula; central gray substance of midbrain; seminiferous tubule; More reference expression data
BioGPS	n/a
Gene ontology
Molecular function	protein binding
Cellular component	cytoplasm; cytosol; trans-Golgi network; Golgi apparatus; endoplasmic reticulum; Golgi membrane; TRAPP complex
Biological process	cell differentiation; COPII vesicle coating; positive regulation of NF-kappaB transcription factor activity; neuron differentiation; cerebral cortex development
Sources:Amigo / QuickGO
Orthologs
Databases	NCBI: entry; OMA: entry
Species	Human	Mouse
Entrez	83696	76510
Ensembl	ENSG00000167632	ENSMUSG00000047921
UniProt	Q96Q05	Q3U0M1
RefSeq (mRNA)	NM_001160372; NM_031466; NM_001321646; NM_001374682; NM_001374683 NM_001374684	NM_001164641; NM_001164642; NM_001164643; NM_029640; NM_180662
RefSeq (protein)	NP_001153844; NP_001308575; NP_113654; NP_001361611; NP_001361612 NP_001361613	NP_001158113; NP_001158115; NP_083916; NP_850993
Location (UCSC)	Chr 8: 139.73 – 140.46 Mb	Chr 15: 72.46 – 72.93 Mb
PubMed search
- Wikidata
View/Edit Human	View/Edit Mouse

Trafficking protein particle complex 9 is a protein that in humans is encoded by the TRAPPC9 gene.

== Function ==
This gene encodes a protein that likely plays a role in NF-kappa-B signaling. Mutations in this gene have been associated with autosomal-recessive intellectual disability. Alternatively spliced transcript variants have been described.
