= LCRB =

Gene in the species Homo sapiens

Identifiers
- Aliases: locus control regionbeta
- External IDs: GeneCards: ; OMA:- orthologs
Orthologs
Species	Human	Mouse
Entrez	387281	n/a
Ensembl	n/a	n/a
UniProt	n a	n/a
RefSeq (mRNA)	n/a	n/a
RefSeq (protein)	n/a	n/a
Location (UCSC)	n/a	n/a
PubMed search		n/a
- Wikidata
View/Edit Human

Locus control region, beta is a protein that in humans is encoded by the LCRB gene.
