= Laminin =

Protein in the extracellular matrix

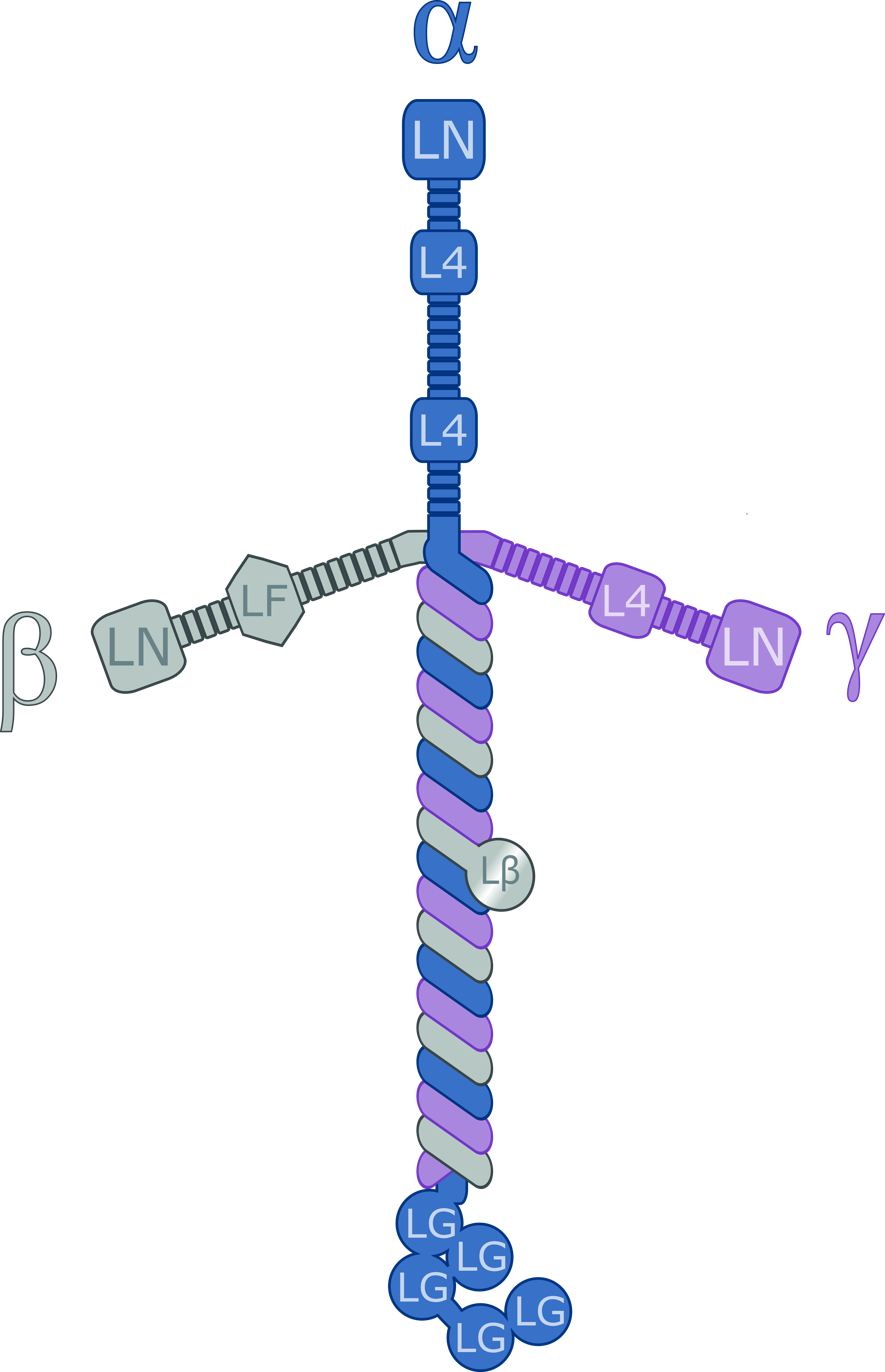
Illustration of the laminin-111 complex depicting the domain organization

Laminins are a family of glycoproteins of the extracellular matrix of all animals. They are major constituents of the basement membrane, namely the basal lamina (the protein network foundation for most cells and organs). Laminins are vital to biological activity, influencing cell differentiation, migration, and adhesion.

Laminins are heterotrimeric protein complexes with a high molecular mass (~400 to ~900 kDa) and possess three different chains (α, β, and γ) encoded by five, four, and three paralogous genes in humans, respectively. The laminin molecules are named according to their chain composition, e.g. laminin-511 contains α5, β1, and γ1 chains. Fourteen other chain combinations have been identified in vivo. The trimeric proteins intersect, composing a cruciform structure that is able to bind to other molecules of the extracellular matrix and cell membrane. The three short arms have an affinity for binding to other laminin molecules, conducing sheet formation. The long arm is capable of binding to cells and helps anchor organized tissue cells to the basement membrane.

Laminins are integral to the structural scaffolding of almost every tissue of an organism—secreted and incorporated into cell-associated extracellular matrices. These glycoproteins are imperative to the maintenance and vitality of tissue; defective laminins can cause muscles to form improperly, leading to a form of muscular dystrophy, lethal skin blistering disease (junctional epidermolysis bullosa), and/or defects of the kidney filter (nephrotic syndrome).

== Types ==
In humans, fifteen laminin trimers have been identified. The laminins are combinations of different alpha-, beta-, and gamma-chains.

- Five alpha-chain paralogs: LAMA1, LAMA2, LAMA3 (which has three splice forms), LAMA4, LAMA5
- Four beta-chain paralogs: LAMB1, LAMB2, LAMB3, LAMB4 (note that no known laminin trimer incorporates LAMB4 and its function remains poorly understood).
- Three gamma-chain paralogs: LAMC1, LAMC2, LAMC3

Laminins were previously numbered as they were discovered, i.e., laminin-1, laminin-2, laminin-3, etc., but the nomenclature was changed to describe which chains are present in each isoform (laminin-111, laminin-211, etc.). In addition, many laminins had common names before either laminin nomenclature was in place.

Old nomenclature	Old synonyms	Chain composition	New nomenclature
Laminin-1	EHS laminin	α1β1γ1	Laminin-111
Laminin-2	Merosin	α2β1γ1	Laminin-211
Laminin-3	S-laminin	α1β2γ1	Laminin-121
Laminin-4	S-merosin	α2β2γ1	Laminin-221
Laminin-5 / Laminin-5A	Kalinin, epiligrin, nicein, ladsin	α3Aβ3γ2	Laminin-332 / Laminin-3A32
Laminin-5B		α3Bβ3γ2	Laminin-3B32
Laminin-6 / Laminin-6A	K-laminin	α3Aβ1γ1	Laminin-311 / Laminin-3A11
Laminin-7 / Laminin-7A	KS-laminin	α3Aβ2γ1	Laminin-321 / Laminin-3A21
Laminin-8		α4β1γ1	Laminin-411
Laminin-9		α4β2γ1	Laminin-421
Laminin-10	Drosophila-like laminin	α5β1γ1	Laminin-511
Laminin-11		α5β2γ1	Laminin-521
Laminin-12		α2β1γ3	Laminin-213
Laminin-14		α4β2γ3	Laminin-423
		α5β2γ2	Laminin-522
Laminin-15		α5β2γ3	Laminin-523

== Function ==
Laminins form independent networks and are associated with type IV collagen networks via entactin, fibronectin, and perlecan. The proteins also bind to cell membranes through integrins and other plasma membrane molecules, such as the dystroglycan glycoprotein complex and Lutheran blood group glycoprotein. Through these interactions, laminins critically contribute to cell attachment and differentiation, cell shape and movement, maintenance of tissue phenotype, and promotion of tissue survival. Some of these biological functions of laminin have been associated with specific amino-acid sequences or fragments of laminin. For example, the peptide sequence [GTFALRGDNGDNGQ], which is located on the alpha-chain of laminin, promotes the adhesion of endothelial cells.

Laminin alpha4 is distributed in a variety of tissues, including peripheral nerves, dorsal root ganglion, skeletal muscle, and capillaries; in the neuromuscular junction, it is required for synaptic specialisation. The structure of the laminin-G domain has been predicted to resemble that of pentraxin.

=== Role in neural development ===
Laminin-111 is a major substrate along which nerve axons will grow, both in vivo and in vitro. For example, it lays down a path that developing retinal ganglion cells follow on their way from the retina to the tectum. It is also often used as a substrate in cell culture experiments. The presence of laminin-111 can influence how the growth cone responds to other cues. For example, growth cones are repelled by netrin when grown on laminin-111 but are attracted to netrin when grown on fibronectin. This effect of laminin-111 probably occurs through a lowering of intracellular cyclic AMP.

=== Role in peripheral nerve repair ===
Laminins are enriched at the lesion site after peripheral nerve injury and are secreted by Schwann cells. Neurons of the peripheral nervous system express integrin receptors that attach to laminins and promote neuroregeneration after injury.

== Pathology ==
Dysfunctional structure of one particular laminin, laminin-211, is the cause of one form of congenital muscular dystrophy. Laminin-211 is composed of α2, β1, and γ1 chains. This laminin's distribution includes the brain and muscle fibers. In muscle, it binds to alpha-dystroglycan and integrin alpha7—beta1 via the G domain, and via the other end, it binds to the extracellular matrix.

Abnormal laminin-332, essential for epithelial cell adhesion to the basement membrane, leads to junctional epidermolysis bullosa, characterized by generalized blisters, exuberant granulation tissue of the skin and mucosa, and pitted teeth.

Malfunctional laminin-521 in the kidney filter causes leakage of protein into the urine and nephrotic syndrome.

=== Role in cancer ===
Some of the laminin isoforms have been implicated in cancer pathophysiology. The majority of transcripts that harbor an internal ribosome entry site (IRES) are involved in cancer development via corresponding proteins. A crucial event in tumor progression, referred to as the epithelial-to-mesenchymal transition (EMT) allows carcinoma cells to acquire invasive properties. The translational activation of the extracellular matrix component laminin B1 (LAMB1) during EMT has been recently reported, suggesting an IRES-mediated mechanism. The IRES activity of LamB1 was determined by independent bicistronic reporter assays. Strong evidence excludes an impact of cryptic promoter or splice sites on IRES-driven translation of LamB1. Furthermore, no other LamB1 mRNA species arising from alternative transcription start sites or polyadenylation signals were detected that account for its translational control. Mapping of the LamB1 5'-untranslated region (UTR) revealed the minimal LamB1 IRES motif between -293 and -1 upstream of the start codon. RNA affinity purification demonstrated that the La protein interacts with the LamB1 IRES. This interaction and its regulation during EMT were confirmed by ribonucleoprotein immunoprecipitation. La is able to positively modulate LamB1 IRES translation, so LamB1 IRES is activated by binding to La which leads to translational upregulation during hepatocellular EMT.

== Use in cell culture ==
Together with other major components of the ECM, such as collagens and fibronectin, laminins have been used to enhance mammalian cell culture, especially in the case of pluripotent stem cells, as well as some primary cell cultures, which can be difficult to propagate on other substrates. Two types of naturally sourced laminins are commercially available: Laminin-111, extracted from mouse sarcomas, and laminin mixtures from human placenta, which may primarily correspond to laminin-211, 411, or 511, depending on the provider. The various laminin paralogs are practically impossible to isolate from tissues in pure form due to extensive cross-linking and the need for harsh extraction conditions, such as proteolytic enzymes or low pH, that cause degradation. Therefore, recombinant laminins have been produced since the year 2000. This made it possible to test if laminins could have a significant role in vitro as they have in the human body. In 2008, two groups independently showed that mouse embryonic stem cells can be grown for months on top of recombinant laminin-511. Later, Rodin et al. showed that recombinant laminin-511 can be used to create a xeno-free and defined cell culture environment to culture human pluripotent ES cells and human iPS cells.

== Laminin domains ==
Laminin Domain I

Identifiers
- Symbol: Laminin_I
- Pfam: PF06008
- InterPro: IPR009254
Available protein structures:
- PDB: IPR009254 PF06008 (ECOD; PDBsum)
- AlphaFold: IPR009254; PF06008

Laminin Domain II

Identifiers
- Symbol: Laminin_II
- Pfam: PF06009
- InterPro: IPR010307
Available protein structures:
- PDB: IPR010307 PF06009 (ECOD; PDBsum)
- AlphaFold: IPR010307; PF06009

Laminin B (Domain IV)

Identifiers
- Symbol: Laminin_B
- Pfam: PF00052
- InterPro: IPR000034
Available protein structures:
- PDB: IPR000034 PF00052 (ECOD; PDBsum)
- AlphaFold: IPR000034; PF00052

Laminin EGF-like (Domains III and V)
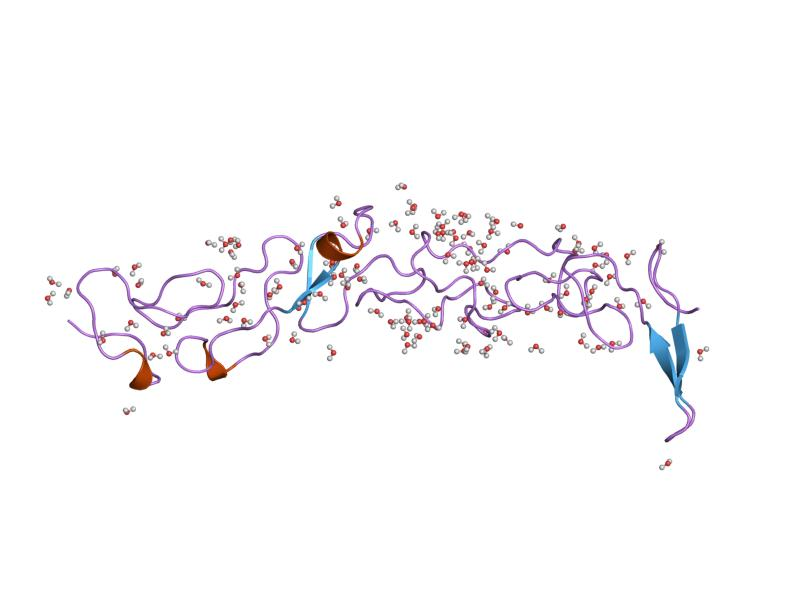
- crystal structure of three consecutive laminin-type epidermal growth factor-like (le) modules of laminin gamma1 chain harboring the nidogen binding site

Identifiers
- Symbol: Laminin_EGF
- Pfam: PF00053
- Pfam clan: CL0001
- InterPro: IPR002049
- PROSITE: PDOC00021
- SCOP2: 1tle / SCOPe / SUPFAM
Available protein structures:
- PDB: IPR002049 PF00053 (ECOD; PDBsum)
- AlphaFold: IPR002049; PF00053

Laminin G domain
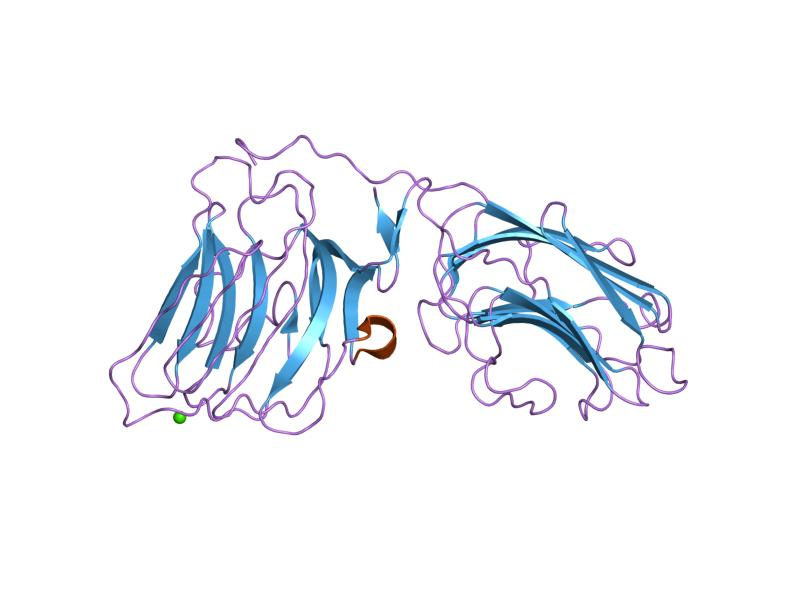
- laminin alpha 2 chain lg4-5 domain pair, ca1 site mutant

Identifiers
- Symbol: Laminin_G_1
- Pfam: PF00054
- Pfam clan: CL0004
- InterPro: IPR012679
- SCOP2: 1qu0 / SCOPe / SUPFAM
Available protein structures:
- PDB: IPR012679 PF00054 (ECOD; PDBsum)
- AlphaFold: IPR012679; PF00054

Laminin G domain
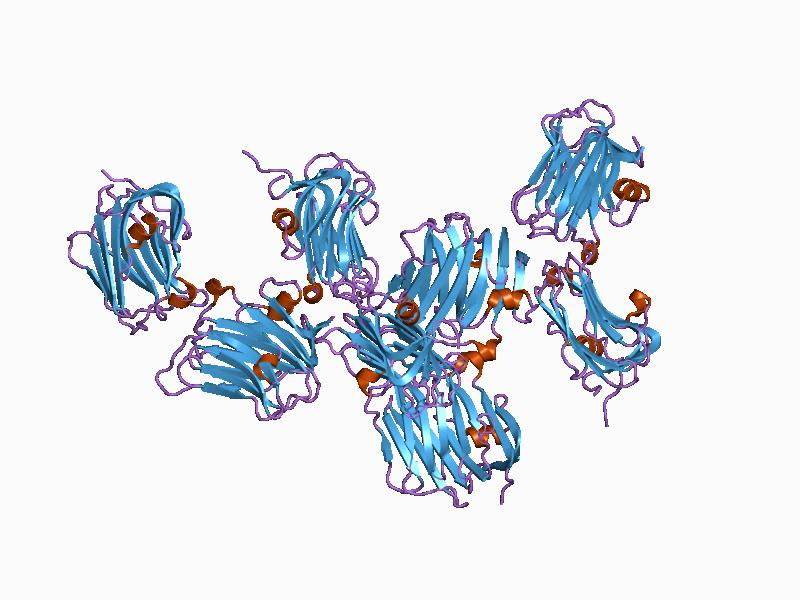
- the structure of the ligand-binding domain of neurexin 1beta: regulation of lns domain function by alternative splicing

Identifiers
- Symbol: Laminin_G_2
- Pfam: PF02210
- Pfam clan: CL0004
- InterPro: IPR012680
- SMART: TSPN
Available protein structures:
- PDB: IPR012680 PF02210 (ECOD; PDBsum)
- AlphaFold: IPR012680; PF02210

Laminin N-terminal (Domain VI)

Identifiers
- Symbol: Laminin_N
- Pfam: PF00055
- Pfam clan: CL0202
- InterPro: IPR008211
- SMART: LamNT
- SCOP2: 1klo / SCOPe / SUPFAM
Available protein structures:
- PDB: IPR008211 PF00055 (ECOD; PDBsum)
- AlphaFold: IPR008211; PF00055

Laminins contain several conserved protein domains.

=== Laminin I and Laminin II ===
Laminins are trimeric molecules; laminin-1 is an alpha1 beta1 gamma1 trimer. It has been suggested that the domains I and II from laminin A, B1 and B2 may come together to form a triple helical coiled-coil structure.

=== Laminin B ===
The laminin B domain (also known as domain IV) is an extracellular module of unknown function. It is found in a number of different proteins that include, heparan sulphate proteoglycan from basement membrane, a laminin-like protein from Caenorhabditis elegans and laminin. Laminin IV domain is not found in short laminin chains (alpha4 or beta3).

=== Laminin EGF-like ===
Beside different types of globular domains each laminin subunit contains, in its first half, consecutive repeats of about 60 amino acids in length that include eight conserved cysteines. The tertiary structure of this domain is remotely similar in its N-terminus to that of the EGF-like module. It is also known as a 'LE' or 'laminin-type EGF-like' domain. The number of copies of the laminin EGF-like domain in the different forms of laminins is highly variable; from 3 up to 22 copies have been found. In mouse laminin gamma-1 chain, the seventh LE domain has been shown to be the only one that binds with a high affinity to nidogen. The binding-sites are located on the surface within the loops C1-C3 and C5-C6. Long consecutive arrays of laminin EGF-like domains in laminins form rod-like elements of limited flexibility, which determine the spacing in the formation of laminin networks of basement membranes.

=== Laminin G ===
The laminin globular (G) domain, also known as the LNS (Laminin-alpha, Neurexin and Sex hormone-binding globulin) domain, is on average 177 amino acids in length and can be found in one to six copies in various laminin family members as well as in a large number of other extracellular proteins. For example, all laminin alpha-chains have five laminin G domains, all collagen family proteins have one laminin G domain, the CNTNAP proteins have four laminin G domains, while neurexin 1 and 2 each hold six laminin G domains. On average, approximately one quarter of the proteins that hold laminin G domains is taken up by these laminin G domains themselves. The smallest laminin G domain can be found in one of the collagen proteins (COL24A1; 77 AA) and the largest domain in TSPEAR (219 AA).

The exact function of the Laminin G domains has remained elusive, and a variety of binding functions has been ascribed to different Laminin G modules. For example, the laminin alpha1 and alpha2 chains each have five C-terminal laminin G domains, where only domains LG4 and LG5 contain binding sites for heparin, sulphatides and the cell surface receptor dystroglycan. Laminin G-containing proteins appear to have a wide variety of roles in cell adhesion, signalling, migration, assembly and differentiation.

=== Laminin N-terminal ===
Basement membrane assembly is a cooperative process in which laminins polymerise through their N-terminal domain (LN or domain VI) and anchor to the cell surface through their G domains. Netrins may also associate with this network through heterotypic LN domain interactions. This leads to cell signalling through integrins and dystroglycan (and possibly other receptors) recruited to the adherent laminin. This LN domain-dependent self-assembly is considered to be crucial for the integrity of basement membranes, as highlighted by genetic forms of muscular dystrophy containing the deletion of the LN module from the alpha 2 laminin chain. The laminin N-terminal domain is found in all laminin and netrin subunits except laminin alpha 3A, alpha 4 and gamma 2.

== Human proteins containing laminin domains ==
- Laminin domain I: all laminin alpha chains (LAMA1, LAMA2, LAMA3, LAMA4, LAMA5)
- Laminin domain II: all laminin alpha chains (LAMA1, LAMA2, LAMA3, LAMA4, LAMA5)
- Laminin B (domain IV): all laminin alpha chains (LAMA1, LAMA2, LAMA3, LAMA4, LAMA5), gamma chains (LAMC1, LAMC2, LAMC3), and perlecan (HSPG2)
- Laminin EGF-like (domains III and V): all laminin chains (LAMA1, LAMA2, LAMA3, LAMA4, LAMA5, LAMB1, LAMB2, LAMB3, LAMB4, LAMC1, LAMC2, LAMC3), attractins (ATRN, ATRNL1), cadherin EGF LAG seven-pass G-type receptors (CELSR1, CELSR2, CELSR3), cysteine-rich with EGF-like domain proteins (CRELD1, CRELD2), multiple EGF-like domain proteins (MEGF6, MEGF8, MEGF9, MEGF10, PEAR1), most netrins (NTN1, NTN3, NTN4, NTNG1, NTNG2), mucins 3A and 3B (MUC3A, MUC3B), class F scavenger receptors (SCARF1, SCARF2), stabilins (STAB1, STAB2), agrin (AGRIN), angiopoietin-1 receptor (TEK), perlecan (HSPG2), tenascin N (TNN), and usherin (USH2A).
- Laminin G domain: all laminin alpha chains (LAMA1, LAMA2, LAMA3, LAMA4, LAMA5), cadherin EGF LAG seven-pass G-type receptors (CELSR1, CELSR2, CELSR3), contactin-associated proteins (CNTNAP1, CNTNAP2, CNTNAP3, CNTNAP3B, CNTNAP4, CNTNAP5), some collagens (COL5A1, COL5A3, COL9A1, COL11A1, COL11A2, COL12A1, COL14A1, COL15A1, COL16A1, COL18A1, COL19A1, COL20A1, COL21A1, COL22A1, COL24A1, COL27A1), crumbs homologs 1 and 2 (CRB1, CRB2), fat homologs (FAT1, FAT2, FAT3, FAT4), NEL-like proteins (NELL1, NELL2), neurexins (NRXN1, NRXN2, NRXN3), slit homologs (SLIT1, SLIT2, SLIT3), thrombospondins (THBS1, THBS2, THBS3, THBS4, TSPEAR), agrin (AGRIN), chondroitin sulfate proteoglycan 4 (CSPG4), eyes shut homolog (EYS), growth arrest-specific protein 6 (GAS6), perlecan (HSPG2), pikachurin (EGFLAM), protein S (PROS1), sex hormone-binding globulin (SHBG) and usherin (USH2A)
- Laminin N-terminal (domain VI): most laminin chains (LAMA1, LAMA2, LAMA3, LAMA5, LAMB1, LAMB2, LAMB3, LAMB4, LAMC1, LAMC3), most netrins (NTN1, NTN3, NTN4, NTNG1, NTNG2), and usherin (USH2A)

== See also ==
- Laminin database
- List of target antigens in pemphigoid
- Polylaminin
- Vitiligo
