= Gamma subunit =

Gamma subunit may refer to:

- ATP synthase gamma subunit
- G gamma subunit; see GGL domain
- G beta gamma subunit; see Beta-gamma complex
- Gamma g subunit; see Heterotrimeric G protein
- Hemoglobin subunit gamma-1; see HBG1
- Hemoglobin subunit gamma-2; see HBG2

== See also ==
- Gamma secretase
- Laminin, gamma 1
- Laminin, gamma 2
