= LAMA2 related congenital muscular dystrophy =

Medical condition neuromuscular disorders

LAMA2 muscular dystrophy
- Other names: Congenital muscular dystrophy type 1A (MDC1A) or Merosin-deficient congenital muscular dystrophy, Late-onset LAMA2 muscular dystrophy or limb girdle muscular dystrophy 23 (LGMDR23), Laminin subunit alpha-2 muscular dystrophy.
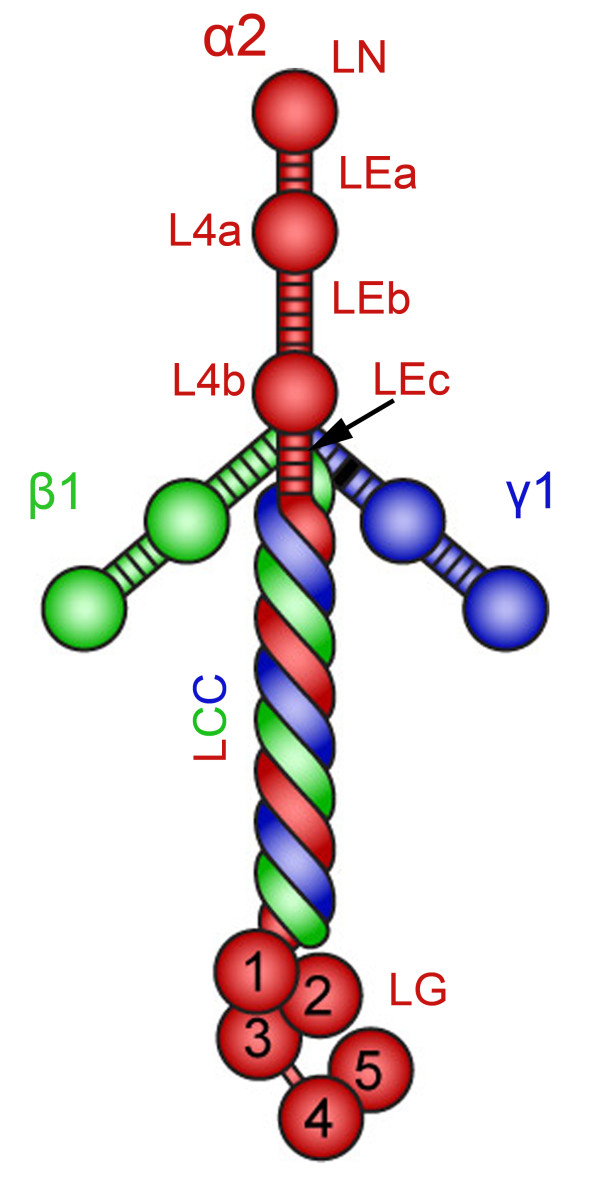
- Diagrammatic illustration of laminin-211 or Laminin-alpha2 chain. The alpha2 chain is shown in red.
- Specialty: Neurology; Pediatrics; Genetics; Orthopedics
- Symptoms: Developmental delay; muscle weakness; muscle floppiness; muscle and joint stiffness; spine deformity; cardiomyopathy; seizures; respiratory difficulties
- Usual onset: Early onset type 1A (MDC1A) or late-onset LAMA2 muscular dystrophy
- Causes: Pathogenic variants or mutations in the LAMA2 gene
- Diagnostic method: Muscle biopsy; brain MRI; whole-body muscle MRI; genetic testing
- Differential diagnosis: Congenital muscular dystrophyies and Congenital myopathies
- Treatment: No cure; Supportive treatment

LAMA2 muscular dystrophy (LAMA2-MD) is a genetically determined muscle disease caused by pathogenic mutations in the LAMA2 gene. It is a subtype of a larger group of genetic muscle diseases known collectively as congenital muscular dystrophies. The clinical presentation of LAMA2-MD varies according to the age at presentation. The severe forms present at birth and are known as early onset LAMA2 congenital muscular dystrophy type 1A or MDC1A. The mild forms are known as late onset LAMA2 muscular dystrophy or late onset LAMA2-MD. The nomenclature LGMDR23 can be used interchangeably with late onset LAMA2-MD.

Suggestive clinical features include, muscular hyperlaxity or hypotonia, growth retardation progressive spine and joint contractures, and cardiac and respiratory failure. For consensus, generally, the term congenital muscular dystrophy refers to a diverse group of childhood onset muscle diseases -usually occurring the first two years of life- and mostly inherited through an autosomal recessive mode. Congenital muscular dystrophies have known phenotype-genotype profiles and produce muscle degenerative pathology.

== Symptoms and signs ==
There are two types of LAMA2 muscular dystrophy (LAMA2-MD). The first type is the congenital type known as early onset LAMA2 congenital muscular dystrophy type 1A or MDC1A. It presents at birth and has a relatively severe clinical presentation. Characteristically it manifests in muscle weakness, hyperlaxity or hypotonia, respiratory difficulties and developmental delay.

The second type is the late onset LAMA2 muscular dystrophy or late onset LAMA2-MD. The age of presentation of late onset LAMA2-MD ranges from early childhood to adulthood. It usually has a mild clinical presentation in the form of progressive spine and joint contractures, and cardiac and respiratory failure.

=== Musculoskeletal manifestations ===
Delayed development of motor milestones as loss of ambulatory capacity is usually more severe in the congenital type 1A or MDC1A. Skeletal muscle weakness is a characteristic feature. It more evident in the proximal muscles of the extremities. Facial and neck weakness have also been reported. Scoliosis is a side curvature or abnormal deviation of the spine with an element of rotation. Scoliosis is usually rigid and progressive. It may be accompanied by lordosis.

The clinical orthopedic features of congenital type 1A (MDC1A) in terms of type, distribution, laterality, deformity progression, chronological order of muscle and joint involvement etc., have shown a fairly characteristic pattern. This is important to the differential diagnosis of LAMA2-MD and other subtypes of congenital muscular dystrophies among others. LAMA2-MD especially MDC1A, usually manifests in progressive contractures of large joints like knees, ankles, elbow and hips. Contractures tend to be bilateral. That is involving both the left and right sides. Observing the chronological order of development of joint contractures, namely early versus late in the disease course, could offer differential diagnostic clues for congenital muscular dystrophies as MDC1A, LMNA-Related muscular dystrophy among other genetic muscle diseases. Of note, any unique clinical orthopedic features of LAMA2-MD should be put into context with the other clinical features, characteristic brain and muscle imaging, muscle immunostaining and genetic testing findings. An International retrospective early natural history study of LAMA2-MD proposed a classification based on motor or ambulatory capacity in which patients who attain the ability to sit and remain seated are classified as LAMA2-MD1 or LAMA2-RD1 and those who attain the ability to walk independently are classified as LAMA2-MD2 or LAMA2-RD2. A study on a large series LAMA2-MD patients showed that bone mineral density was reduced in all adults and most children. Fragility fractures were reported occasionally.

=== Respiratory insufficiency ===
Respiratory insufficiency can occur in both types of LAMA2-MD. Respiratory tract infections are a cause of death in the congenital type 1A or MDC1A.

=== Cardiac manifestations ===
Cardiac involvement in LAMA2-MD may manifest in dilated cardiomyopathy and systolic dysfunction. Cardiac screening and surveillance are important in LAMA2-MD. This is aimed at timely diagnosis and management of subclinical cardiac involvement.

=== Cerebral manifestations ===
Epilepsy is a fairly common manifestation of both types of LAMA2-MD. However, the age at occurrence of first epileptic fit is earlier in the congenital type 1A or MDC1A. Screening for epilepsy should be included in the workup. Intelligence is usually normal. Epilepsy and intellectual disability were associated with motor dysfunction namely inability to sit and/or walk. Epilepsy and to a lesser extent intellectual disability were also strongly correlated to cortical abnormalities on brain MRI.

== Cause ==
LAMA2-MD is caused by pathogenic variants or mutations in the LAMA2 gene that encodes alpha2 chain of laminin-211 or laminin-alpha2, previously known as laminin type 2 or merosin. laminin-211 is important to the function and integrity of the sarcolemma of muscle fibers. laminin-alpha2 is also present in extra-muscular locations as the central and peripheral nervous system. Pathogenic variants of the LAMA2 gene which lead to loss of function are accompanied by complete deficiency of laminin-alpha2 (merosin) and result in a severe clinical picture or phenotype namely early onset MDC1A. Pathogenic variants of the LAMA2 gene accompanied by partial deficiency of laminin-alpha2 result in a milder clinical picture namely late onset LAMA2 muscular dystrophy or late onset LAMA2-MD. The disease is inherited through an autosomal recessive mode.

== Diagnosis ==
Correlating the characteristic clinical picture with the specific imaging, laboratory and muscle biopsy findings is essential to the diagnosis of LAMA2-MD. The presence of pathogenic variants in LAMA2 gene by Genetic testing, -DNA testing- of the affected individual confirms the diagnosis of LAMA2-MD.

=== Brain MRI ===
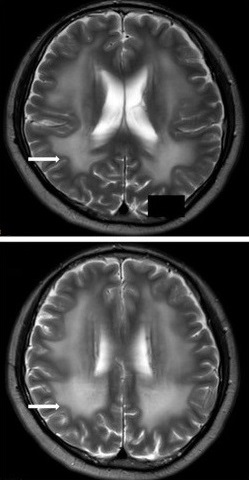
Brain MRI of a patient with late-onset LAMA2-MD showing white matter abnormalities (hyperintensities) in T2.

Abnormal white matter signals in Brain MRI is a near-universal sign in patients with LAMA2-MD. These white matter abnormalities appear as hyperintense signals on T2-weighted and FLAIR brain MRI images especially in locations that are originally myelinated in the immature brain as the periventricular area. Occasional MRI abnormalities include cortical malformations as polymicrogyria, lissencephaly, pachygyria. In LAMA2-MD there seems to be a directly proportional relationship between the magnitude of white mater and cortical abnormalities on brain MRI and the degree of motor dysfunction in terms of the ability to sit and walk.

=== Whole body muscle MRI ===
Muscle MRI especially Whole-body muscle MRI can provide important diagnostic clues. Some studies have shown a reasonably characteristic pattern of muscle involvement on whole-body muscle MRI in LAMA2-MD patients. This relates to muscles or group of muscles involvement versus sparing. For example, sparing of the gracilis, sartorius muscles, and the adductor longus muscle has been linked to LAMA2-MD. On the other hand, studies showed a specific predilection to involve the gluteus maximus and anterior thigh muscles, adductor magnus muscle, serratus anterior muscle in LAMA2-MD, and so forth. Abnormal muscle texture or geometry on muscle MRI as presence of granular pattern of involvement in a muscle has been suggested to be a diagnostic clue. Similarly, a homogenous pattern of involvement of group of muscle e.g., anterior compartment of thigh, could be used to support diagnosis. Homogenous pattern refers to involvement of all individual muscles of a muscle compartment to the same extent. Moreover, Whole body muscle MRI could be indicative of clinical disease severity and duration of LAMA2-MD. It can also help establish phenotype genotype correlations

However, these muscle MRI features may overlap with other subtypes of congenital muscular dystrophy. Additionally, some inconsistencies between the above muscle imaging studies can be noted. Thus, more longitudinal studies with larger cohorts and standardized methodologies are needed to arrive at a more uniform and consistent muscle MRI signature in LAMA2-MD. It is therefore paramount to correlate muscle imaging findings with clinical, neuro-imaging, laboratory and genetic testing findings.

=== Muscle biopsy or immunostaining ===
There is an inversely proportional relationship between the quantity of laminin alpha2 (merosin) found on immunohistochemistry and disease severity. That means, a more marked degree of laminin-alpha2 deficiency e.g., total or near-total deficiency, is associated with more pronounced muscle degenerative pathology as myofibrosis, necrosis and fiber size variation. This is also associated with a more severe clinical picture. A less marked degree of laminin-alpha2 (merosin) deficiency -residual staining- is associated with a less pronounced muscle degenerative pathology and a milder clinical picture. Generally, congenital muscular dystrophy type 1A or MDC1A is known to have a severer clinical picture than late onset LAMA2-MD. However, the degree of deficiency of laminin alpha2 (merosin) on immunohistochemistry in MDC1A can varies. Clinical disease severity associated with total laminin-alpha2 (merosin) deficiency usually manifests itself in early onset of symptoms, loss of ambulatory capacity and respiratory difficulties.

== Treatment ==
=== Targeted therapies ===
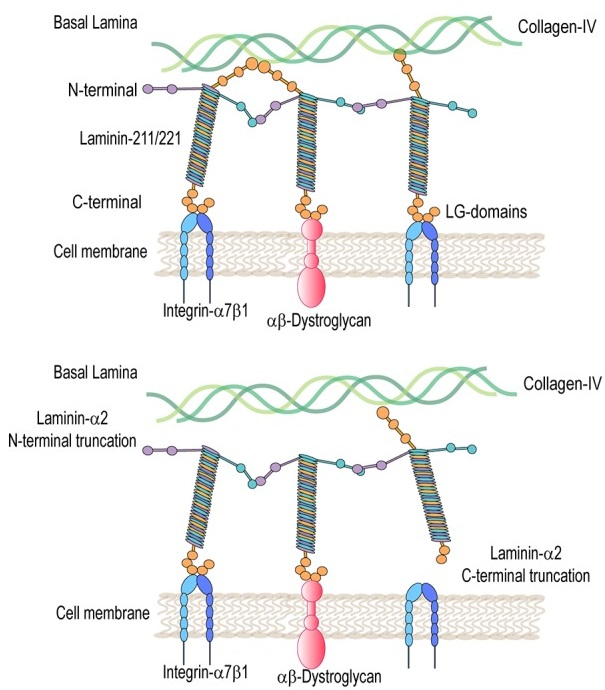
Molecular illustration of laminin alpha2 (211) and laminin-221 complex and muscle cell receptors: integrin-α7β1 and αβ-dystroglycan protein complexes in, healthy (top image) and LAMA2-MD (lower image).

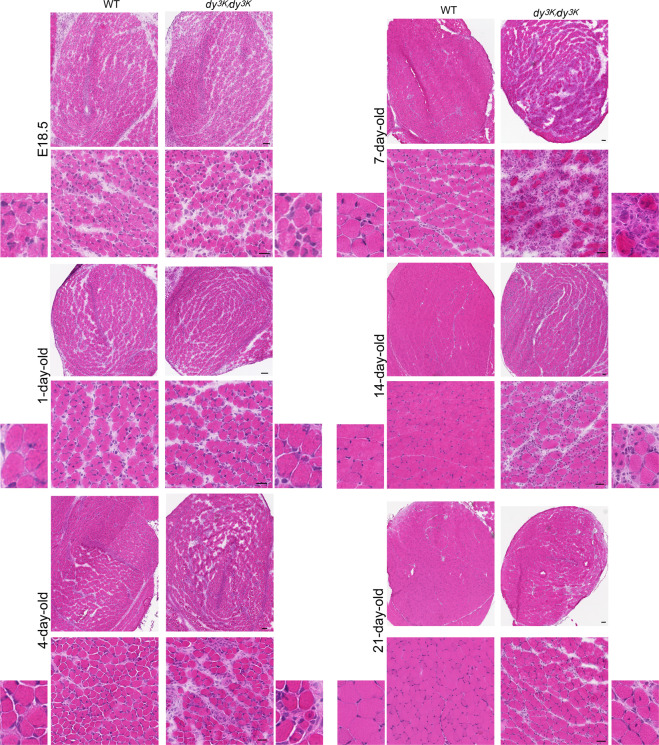
Haematoxylin and eosin staining of rectus femoris muscle of a mouse model of LAMA2 congenital muscular dystrophy. Note the muscle dystrophic changes at different time points of disease course.

There is no definite cure available for LAMA2-MD. However, preclinical studies on experimental animal models of Laminin alpha-2 chain deficient congenital muscular dystrophy are showing favorable yet early results. Generally, these preclinical studies are geared toward investigating the various factors behind disease initiation and progression, and exploration of potential ameliorating or curative therapies. Preclinical studies focus on combating substances that regulate and promote muscle fibrosis in the pathogenesis of LAMA2-MD e.g., TGF-β. This may reduce muscle fibrosis and enhance healthy muscle architecture subsequently. Alternatively, preclinical studies can be geared toward enhancing proteins that are involved in muscle regeneration. Laminin alpha2 (Laminin-211) and laminin-221 complex are an important molecule for muscle cell receptors namely integrin-α7β1 and α-dystroglycan. In LAMA2-CMD the laminin alpha2 deficiency results in malfunctioning or down regulation of integrin-α7β1 and α-dystroglycan. This disrupts the proper linkage between the basal lamina and muscle cell membrane. Consequently, the contractile mechanism is disrupted. Integrin-α7β1 is important to satellite cell function, and myoblast adhesion and viability. Thusly, integrin-α7β1is an important contributor to skeletal muscle regeneration. Cell therapies that compensate for the deficiency or down regulation of integrin-α7β1 have the potential to delay or control the muscle degenerative process and preserve muscle architecture in LAMA2-CMD patients. Additionally, the use of laminin-111 treatment in experimental mouse models of LAMA2-CMD has showed satisfactory results in terms of increase in life expectancy muscle function and regeneration.

=== Supportive treatment ===
Currently, treatment is mainly supportive and palliative. It is directed at anticipating and preventing or alleviating the systemic complications associated disease progression. This refers to management of respiratory, cardiac, orthopedic and rehabilitative, central nervous system e.g., epilepsy, gastrointestinal and so forth.

== Prognosis ==
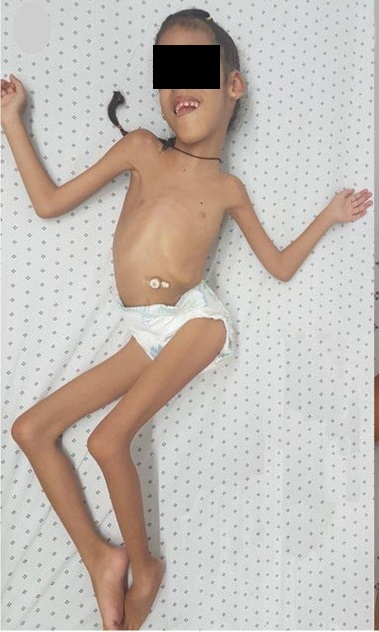
A patient with early onset LAMA2 congenital muscular dystrophy type 1A (MDC1A). Note multiple deformities of the extremities and spine.

Prognosis is dependent on the subtype of LAMA2-MD. Nearly all children with early onset or congenital muscular dystrophy type 1A (MDC1A) are unable to walk independently. Nevertheless, children with MDC1A are usually able to sit. Contrastingly, patients with late onset LAMA2-MD are usually able to walk independently. Of note, in both types of LAMA2-MD developmental motor milestones are delayed. Additionally, the prognosis is dependent on the degree of surveillance and supportive care that patients receive in regard to the multisystem manifestations and potential complications of LAMA2-MD. This refers to prompt and timely management of orthopedic, cardiopulmonary, epilepsy and gastrointestinal systems among others. The multisystem manifestations may affect the quality of life of patients with LAMA2-MD.

== Epidemiology ==
It is estimated that congenital muscular dystrophies occur in between 0.563 per 100,000 (in Italy) and 2.5 per 100,000 (in western Sweden). The prevalence data on congenital muscular dystrophy type 1A (MDC1A) varies by geographic location or population. Example, in the United Kingdom MDC1A constituted about 37% of all congenital muscular dystrophy subtypes namely the most common subtype. In Qatar, MDC1A constituted 48% of congenital muscular dystrophy subtypes with estimated a point prevalence of 0.8 in 100.000 in a patient cohort from the Gulf and Middle East. Contrastingly, in Australia it constituted 16% of all congenital muscular dystrophy subtypes namely the third most common subtype. A scoping review on clinical orthopedic manifestations of congenital muscular dystrophy subtypes reported that the most common subtype was MDC1A accounting for 37% of the total study sample.

== See also ==
- Rigid spine syndrome
- Ullrich congenital muscular dystrophy
- Bethlem myopathy
- LMNA-related congenital muscular dystrophy
- Congenital myopathy
