= Small nucleolar RNA SNORA62 =

Small nucleolar RNA SNORA62/SNORA6 family
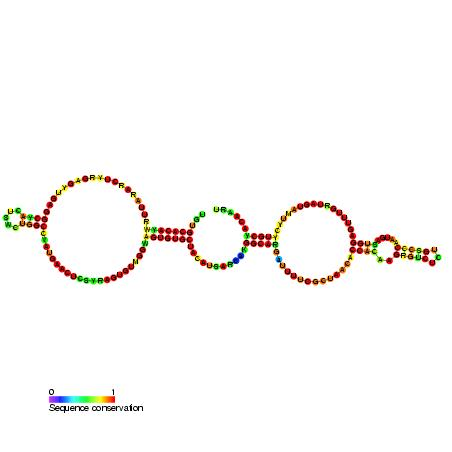
- Predicted secondary structure and sequence conservation of SNORA62

Identifiers
- Symbol: SNORA62
- Alt. Symbols: E2
- Rfam: RF00091

Other data
- RNA type: Gene; snRNA; snoRNA; H/ACA-box
- Domain: Eukaryota
- GO: GO:0006396 GO:0005730
- SO: SO:0000594
- PDB structures: PDBe

In molecular biology, Small nucleolar RNA SNORA62 (E2) belongs to the H/ACA class of snoRNAs.

E2 is involved in the processing of eukaryotic pre-rRNA and has regions of complementarity to 28S rRNA. E2 is encoded in introns in the gene for a laminin-binding protein.

This family also contains the related ACA6, M2 and MBI-136 snoRNAs.
