= Basal cell adhesion molecule =

Protein-coding gene in the species Homo sapiens

BCAM
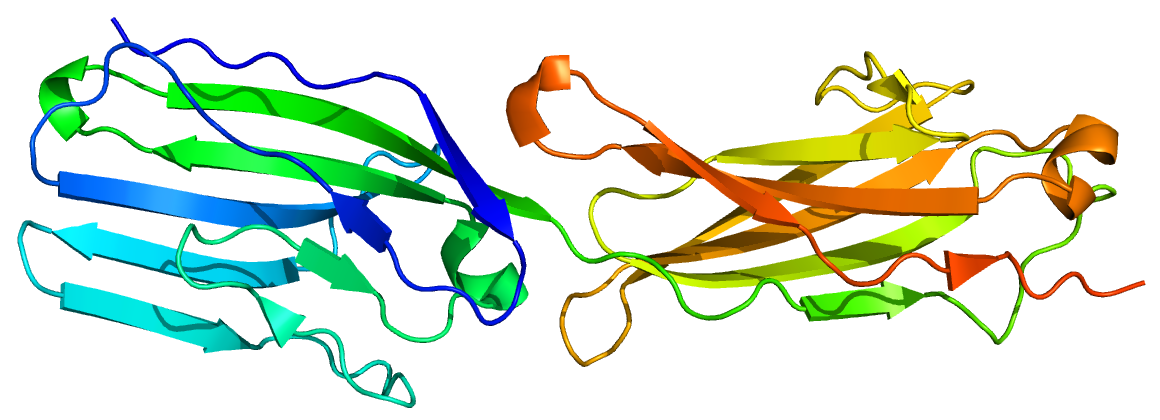

Identifiers
- Aliases: BCAM, AU, CD239, LU, MSK19, basal cell adhesion molecule (Lutheran blood group)
- External IDs: OMIM: 612773; MGI: 1929940; GeneCards: BCAM
Available structures
| PDB | Ortholog search: PDBe RCSB |
| PDB | List of PDB id codes 2PET, 2PF6 |

Gene location (Human)
| Chr. | Chromosome 19 (human) |
| Band | 19q13.32 | Start | 44,809,071 bp |
| Band | 19q13.32 | End | 44,821,421 bp |

Gene location (Mouse)
| Chr. | Chromosome 7 (mouse) |
| Band | 7|7 A3 | Start | 19,490,056 bp |
| Band | 7|7 A3 | End | 19,504,941 bp |
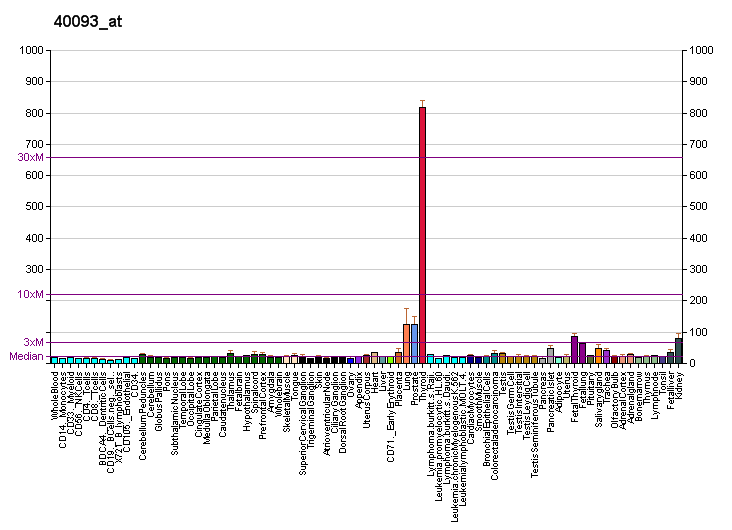

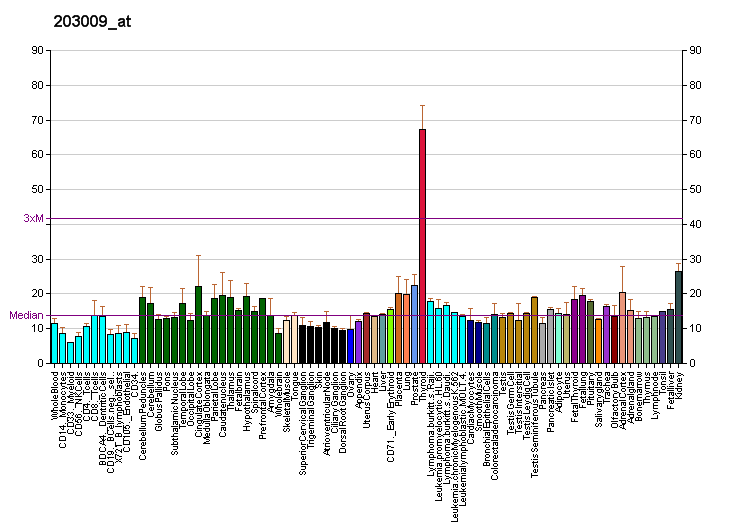
RNA expression pattern
| Bgee | Human / Mouse (ortholog); Top expressed in: right uterine tube; left lobe of thyroid gland; popliteal artery; tibial arteries; right lobe of thyroid gland; right coronary artery; renal medulla; left coronary artery; apex of heart; canal of the cervix / Top expressed in: interventricular septum; lip; molar; right lung; lumbar spinal ganglion; left lung; right lung lobe; left lung lobe; genital tubercle; tunica media of zone of aorta; More reference expression data |
| BioGPS | More reference expression data |
Gene ontology
| Molecular function | laminin receptor activity; protein C-terminus binding; protein binding; laminin binding; transmembrane signaling receptor activity |
| Cellular component | integral component of membrane; cell surface; plasma membrane; integral component of plasma membrane; extracellular exosome; membrane; external side of plasma membrane; extracellular matrix; extracellular region; collagen-containing extracellular matrix |
| Biological process | cell adhesion; cell-matrix adhesion; signal transduction |
Sources:Amigo / QuickGO
Orthologs
| Databases | NCBI: entry; OMA: entry |
| Species | Human | Mouse |
| Entrez | 4059 | 57278 |
| Ensembl | ENSG00000187244 | ENSMUSG00000002980 |
| UniProt | P50895 | Q9R069 |
| RefSeq (mRNA) | NM_005581; NM_001013257 | NM_020486 |
| RefSeq (protein) | NP_001013275; NP_005572 | NP_065232 |
| Location (UCSC) | Chr 19: 44.81 – 44.82 Mb | Chr 7: 19.49 – 19.5 Mb |
| PubMed search |
- Wikidata
| View/Edit Human | View/Edit Mouse |

Basal cell adhesion molecule, also known as Lutheran antigen, is a plasma membrane glycoprotein that in humans is encoded by the BCAM gene. BCAM has also recently been designated CD239 (cluster of differentiation 239).

== Function ==
Lutheran blood group glycoprotein is a member of the immunoglobulin superfamily and a receptor for the extracellular matrix protein, laminin. The protein contains five, N-terminus, extracellular immunoglobulin domains, a single transmembrane domain, and a short, C-terminal cytoplasmic tail. This protein may play a role in epithelial cell cancer and in vaso-occlusion of red blood cells in sickle cell disease. Two transcript variants encoding different isoforms have been found for this gene.

== Interactions ==
BCAM has been shown to interact with Laminin, alpha 5. BCAM has also been shown to promote the metastasis of ovarian cancer.
