= Gastric atresia =

Congenital disorder of the digestive system

Gastric atresia is a congenital defect with complete occlusion of the pyloric outlet of the stomach.

== Cause ==
Gastric atresia is a birth defect. It can be genetic, inherited in an autosomal recessive manner, and associated with conditions like Down syndrome and junctional epidermolysis bullosa (medicine). In about 60% of cases, the outlet of the stomach is covered by a membrane. In around 35% of cases, solid tissue blocks the outlet. In the remaining cases (less than 10%), there is a complete separation of the stomach and the small intestine.

== Diagnosis ==
Polyhydramnios is often seen during pregnancy, and prenatal diagnosis is common. Infants with gastric atresia will exhibit forceful vomiting upon the first feeding. Imaging is required for diagnosis.

== Treatment ==
Treatment is surgical and involves removing or bypassing the obstruction.

== Epidemiology ==
It is seen in approximately 1 in 100,000 live births.
