= Laminin subunit alpha-2 =

Protein-coding gene in the species Homo sapiens

LAMA2
Available structures
| PDB | Ortholog search: PDBe RCSB |
| PDB | List of PDB id codes 4YEP, 4YEQ |

Identifiers
- Aliases: LAMA2, LAMM, Laminin, alpha 2, laminin subunit alpha 2, MDC1A
- External IDs: OMIM: 156225; MGI: 99912; HomoloGene: 37306; GeneCards: LAMA2; OMA:LAMA2 - orthologs

Gene location (Human)
| Chr. | Chromosome 6 (human) |
| Band | 6q22.33 | Start | 128,883,138 bp |
| Band | 6q22.33 | End | 129,516,566 bp |

Gene location (Mouse)
| Chr. | Chromosome 10 (mouse) |
| Band | 10 A4|10 14.23 cM | Start | 26,856,032 bp |
| Band | 10 A4|10 14.23 cM | End | 27,495,754 bp |
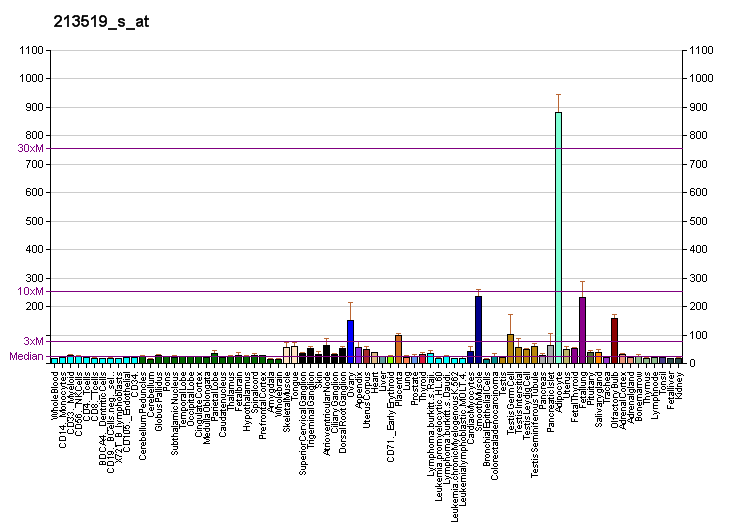

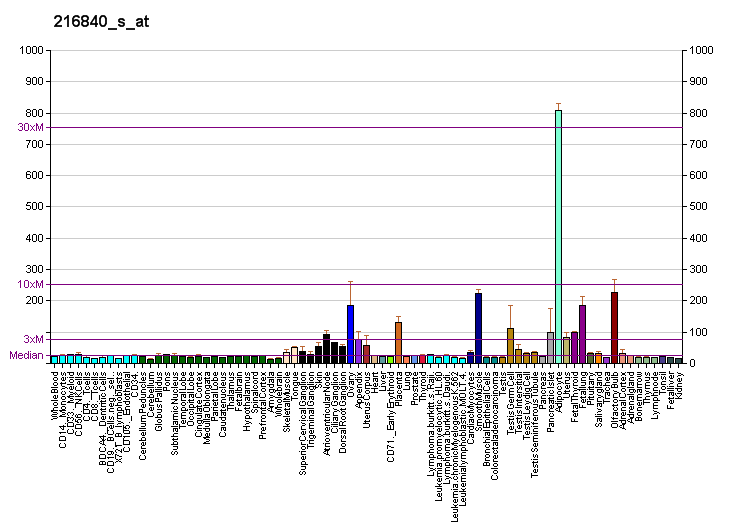

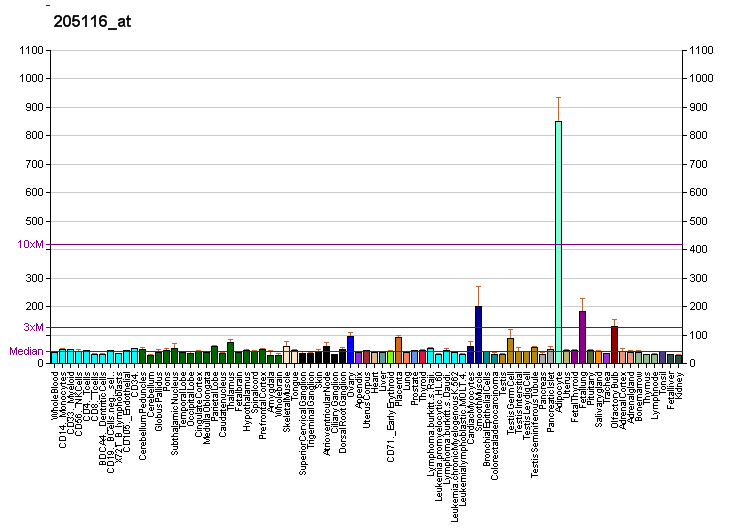
RNA expression pattern
| Bgee | Human / Mouse (ortholog); Top expressed in: gastric mucosa; Achilles tendon; right ovary; left ovary; right lung; atrium; right auricle of heart; myocardium of left ventricle; cardiac muscle tissue of right atrium; pericardium / Top expressed in: sciatic nerve; epithelium of lens; efferent ductule; utricle; vestibular sensory epithelium; ascending aorta; vas deferens; aortic valve; right ventricle; plantaris muscle; More reference expression data |
| BioGPS | More reference expression data |
Gene ontology
| Molecular function | structural molecule activity; signaling receptor binding; extracellular matrix structural constituent |
| Cellular component | extracellular region; dendritic spine; sarcolemma; basement membrane; extracellular matrix; neuromuscular junction; synaptic cleft; collagen-containing extracellular matrix |
| Biological process | muscle organ development; regulation of cell migration; positive regulation of synaptic transmission, cholinergic; regulation of embryonic development; regulation of cell adhesion; axon guidance; cell adhesion; Schwann cell differentiation; extracellular matrix organization; animal organ morphogenesis; tissue development |
Sources:Amigo / QuickGO
Orthologs
| Species | Human | Mouse |
| Entrez | 3908 | 16773 |
| Ensembl | ENSG00000196569 | ENSMUSG00000019899 |
| UniProt | P24043 | Q60675 |
| RefSeq (mRNA) | NM_000426; NM_001079823 | NM_008481 |
| RefSeq (protein) | NP_000417; NP_001073291 | NP_032507 |
| Location (UCSC) | Chr 6: 128.88 – 129.52 Mb | Chr 10: 26.86 – 27.5 Mb |
| PubMed search |
- Wikidata
| View/Edit Human | View/Edit Mouse |

Laminin subunit alpha-2 is a protein that in humans is encoded by the LAMA2 gene.

== Function ==
Laminin, an extracellular matrix protein, is a major component of the basement membrane. It is thought to mediate the attachment, migration, and organization of cells into tissues during embryonic development by interacting with other extracellular matrix components. It is composed of three subunits, alpha, beta, and gamma, which are bound to each other by disulfide bonds into a cross-shaped molecule. This gene encodes the alpha 2 chain, which constitutes one of the subunits of laminin 2 (merosin) and laminin 4 (s-merosin). Mutations in this gene have been identified as the cause of congenital merosin-deficient muscular dystrophy. Two transcript variants encoding different proteins have been found for this gene.

Upregulation of LAMA1 holds potential for treating LAMA2-related muscular dystrophy.
