= Birch triterpenes =

Medication

- Chemical structure of betulin, one of the primary constituents of birch triterpenes

Clinical data
- Trade names: Filsuvez
- Other names: Oleogel-S10
- AHFS/Drugs.com: Monograph
- MedlinePlus: a624016
- License data: US DailyMed: Birch triterpenes
- Routes of administration: Topical
- ATC code: D03AX13 (WHO)

Legal status
- Legal status: US: ℞-only; EU: Rx-only

Identifiers
- CAS Number: 1640971-03-4
- DrugBank: DB16536
- UNII: BX09B0RQR0
- KEGG: D12755

Birch triterpenes, sold under the brand name Filsuvez, is an extract of birch bark used as a topical medication for the treatment of epidermolysis bullosa. The active ingredients are triterpenes extracted from the outer bark of silver birch (Betula pendula) and downy birch (Betula pubescens).

The most common side effects include wound complications such as skin reactions at the application site, infections, pruritus (itching), and hypersensitivity.

Birch triterpenes was approved for medical use in the European Union in June 2022, and in the United States in December 2023.

== Medical uses ==
Epidermolysis bullosa is an inherited disease of the skin that makes the skin very fragile and causes severe blistering and scarring. Birch triterpenes is used in two types of epidermolysis bullosa, dystrophic epidermolysis bullosa and junctional epidermolysis bullosa, to treat partial-thickness skin wounds. These are wounds where the upper layers of the skin have been damaged.

Birch triterpenes is indicated for the treatment of partial thickness wounds associated with dystrophic and junctional epidermolysis bullosa in people aged six months of age and older. The US Food and Drug Administration (FDA) considers it to be a first-in-class medication.

== Side effects ==
The most common side effects include wound complications. Other common side effects include skin reactions at the application site, wound infections, pruritus (itching), and hypersensitivity (allergic) reactions.

== Pharmacology ==
=== Mechanism of action ===
The active substance of birch triterpenes is birch bark extract (as dry extract, refined) from Betula pendula Roth/Betula pubescens Ehrh. (equivalent to 0.5‑1.0 g birch bark), including 84‑95 mg triterpenes calculated as the sum of betulin, betulinic acid, erythrodiol, lupeol, and oleanolic acid. The mechanism of action of birch triterpenes in the treatment of wounds associated with epidermolysis bullosa is unknown. It is thought to work by modulating inflammatory mediators and stimulating keratinocyte differentiation and migration, thereby promoting wound healing and closure.

=== Pharmacodynamics ===
The pharmacodynamics of birch triterpenes are unknown.

== History ==
The US FDA approved birch triterpenes based on evidence from a clinical trial (NCT03068780) of 223 participants with dystrophic and junctional epidermolysis bullosa. The efficacy and safety of birch triterpenes for the treatment of partial-thickness wounds associated with inherited epidermolysis bullosa was evaluated in a randomized, double-blind, placebo-controlled trial in participants aged six months of age and older with dystrophic epidermolysis bullosa and junctional epidermolysis bullosa. The primary endpoint was the proportion of subjects with first complete closure of the target wound by day 45 of the 90-day double-blind phase of the study, based on clinical assessment by the investigator. The trial was conducted at 49 sites in 26 countries including Argentina, Australia, Austria, Belgium, Brazil, Chile, Colombia, Croatia, the Czech Republic, Denmark, France, Germany, Greece, Hong Kong, Hungary, Ireland, Israel, Italy, Romania, Russia, Serbia, Singapore, Spain, Switzerland, the United Kingdom, and the United States. There were 14 participants enrolled in the United States and 209 participants were enrolled outside the United States.

== Society and culture ==
=== Legal status ===
In April 2022, the Committee for Medicinal Products for Human Use (CHMP) of the European Medicines Agency (EMA) adopted a positive opinion, recommending the granting of a marketing authorization for the medicinal product Filsuvez, intended for the treatment of epidermolysis bullosa. The applicant for this medicinal product is Amryt Pharmaceuticals DAC. Birch triterpenes was approved for medical use in the European Union in June 2022, and in the United States in December 2023.
