= CNTNAP4 =

Protein-coding gene in the species Homo sapiens

Available structures
PDB	Ortholog search: PDBe RCSB
PDB	List of PDB id codes 4NXQ

Identifiers
- Aliases: CNTNAP4, CASPR4, contactin associated protein like 4, contactin associated protein family member 4
- External IDs: OMIM: 610518; MGI: 2183572; HomoloGene: 24912; GeneCards: CNTNAP4; OMA:CNTNAP4 - orthologs

Gene location (Human)
Chr.	Chromosome 16 (human)
Band	16q23.1	Start	76,277,278 bp
Band	16q23.1	End	76,560,757 bp

Gene location (Mouse)
Chr.	Chromosome 8 (mouse)
Band	8|8 E1	Start	113,296,675 bp
Band	8|8 E1	End	113,609,349 bp
RNA expression pattern
Bgee	Human / Mouse (ortholog); Top expressed in: C1 segment; corpus callosum; endothelial cell; inferior ganglion of vagus nerve; pons; substantia nigra; subthalamic nucleus; medulla oblongata; hypothalamus; cerebellar hemisphere / Top expressed in: substantia nigra; ventral tegmental area; pontine nuclei; central gray substance of midbrain; dorsomedial hypothalamic nucleus; cerebellar cortex; habenula; trigeminal ganglion; retinal pigment epithelium; lobe of cerebellum; More reference expression data
BioGPS	n/a
Gene ontology
Molecular function	protein binding
Cellular component	integral component of membrane; cell junction; plasma membrane; dendrite; synapse; presynaptic membrane; membrane; GABA-ergic synapse; integral component of presynaptic membrane
Biological process	regulation of synaptic transmission, dopaminergic; regulation of grooming behavior; cell adhesion; regulation of synaptic transmission, GABAergic; regulation of synapse organization
Sources:Amigo / QuickGO
Orthologs
Species	Human	Mouse
Entrez	85445	170571
Ensembl	ENSG00000152910	ENSMUSG00000031772
UniProt	Q9C0A0	Q99P47
RefSeq (mRNA)	NM_033401; NM_138994; NM_001322178; NM_001322179; NM_001322180 NM_001322181; NM_001322187; NM_001322188; NM_001322189; NM_001322190; NM_001322191	NM_130457
RefSeq (protein)	NP_001309107; NP_001309108; NP_001309109; NP_001309110; NP_001309116 NP_001309117; NP_001309118; NP_001309119; NP_001309120; NP_207837; NP_620481	NP_569724
Location (UCSC)	Chr 16: 76.28 – 76.56 Mb	Chr 8: 113.3 – 113.61 Mb
PubMed search
- Wikidata
View/Edit Human	View/Edit Mouse

Contactin-associated protein-like 4 is a protein that in humans is encoded by the CNTNAP4 gene.

This gene product belongs to the neurexin family, members of which function in the vertebrate nervous system as cell adhesion molecules and receptors. This protein, like other neurexin proteins, contains epidermal growth factor repeats and laminin G domains. In addition, it includes an F5/8 type C domain, discoidin/neuropilin- and fibrinogen-like domains, and thrombospondin N-terminal-like domains. Alternative splicing results in two transcript variants encoding different isoforms.
