= Laminin, beta 4 =

Protein-coding gene in the species Homo sapiens

LAMB4

Identifiers
- Aliases: LAMB4, laminin subunit beta 4
- External IDs: OMIM: 616380; HomoloGene: 49135; GeneCards: LAMB4; OMA:LAMB4 - orthologs

Gene location (Human)
| Chr. | Chromosome 7 (human) |
| Band | 7q31.1 | Start | 108,023,548 bp |
| Band | 7q31.1 | End | 108,130,361 bp |
RNA expression pattern
| Bgee | Human / Mouse (ortholog); Top expressed in: skin of abdomen; skin of leg; skin of hip; skin of thigh; testicle; buccal mucosa cell; nipple; skin of arm; gonad; mucosa of esophagus / n/a; More reference expression data |
| BioGPS | n/a |
Gene ontology
| Molecular function | extracellular matrix structural constituent |
| Cellular component | basement membrane; extracellular region; laminin complex |
| Biological process | cell adhesion; animal organ morphogenesis; tissue development; cell migration; substrate adhesion-dependent cell spreading; basement membrane assembly |
Sources:Amigo / QuickGO
Orthologs
| Species | Human | Mouse |
| Entrez | 22798 | n/a |
| Ensembl | ENSG00000091128 | n/a |
| UniProt | A4D0S4 | n/a |
| RefSeq (mRNA) | NM_007356; NM_001318046; NM_001318047; NM_001318048 | n/a |
| RefSeq (protein) | NP_001304975; NP_001304976; NP_001304977; NP_031382 | n/a |
| Location (UCSC) | Chr 7: 108.02 – 108.13 Mb | n/a |
| PubMed search | | n/a |
- Wikidata
| View/Edit Human |

laminin, beta 4

Identifiers
- Symbol: LAMB4
- NCBI gene: 22798
- HGNC: 6491
- RefSeq: XM_209857

Other data
- Locus: Chr. 7 q31

Laminin subunit beta-4 is a laminin protein encoded by the LAMB4 gene.
