= Laminin, alpha 4 =

Protein-coding gene in the species Homo sapiens

LAMA4

Identifiers
- Aliases: LAMA4, CMD1JJ, LAMA3, LAMA4*-1, Laminin, alpha 4, laminin subunit alpha 4
- External IDs: OMIM: 600133; MGI: 109321; HomoloGene: 37604; GeneCards: LAMA4; OMA:LAMA4 - orthologs

Gene location (Human)
Chr.	Chromosome 6 (human)
Band	6q21	Start	112,107,931 bp
Band	6q21	End	112,254,939 bp

Gene location (Mouse)
Chr.	Chromosome 10 (mouse)
Band	10 B1|10 20.02 cM	Start	38,841,511 bp
Band	10 B1|10 20.02 cM	End	38,986,184 bp
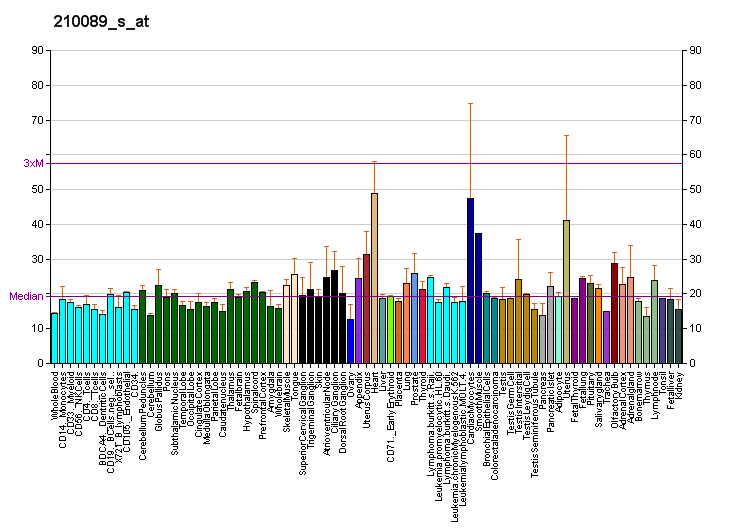

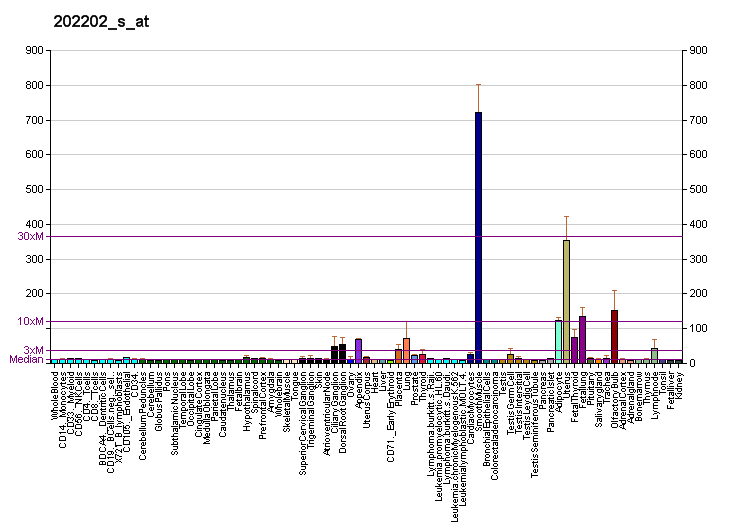

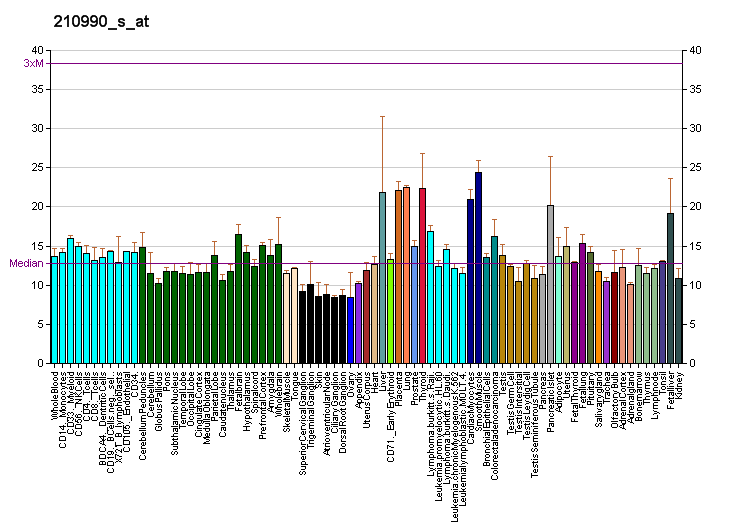
RNA expression pattern
Bgee	Human / Mouse (ortholog); Top expressed in: tibial nerve; left uterine tube; epithelium of colon; smooth muscle tissue; parietal pleura; body of uterus; sural nerve; muscle layer of sigmoid colon; germinal epithelium; saphenous vein / Top expressed in: external carotid artery; internal carotid artery; lumbar spinal ganglion; sciatic nerve; left lung lobe; dermis; tunica media of zone of aorta; white adipose tissue; atrium; calvaria; More reference expression data
BioGPS	More reference expression data
Gene ontology
Molecular function	signaling receptor binding; extracellular matrix structural constituent; protein binding
Cellular component	extracellular region; basement membrane; extracellular exosome; extracellular matrix; collagen-containing extracellular matrix
Biological process	regulation of cell adhesion; cell adhesion; extracellular matrix organization; regulation of cell migration; regulation of embryonic development; negative regulation of cold-induced thermogenesis
Sources:Amigo / QuickGO
Orthologs
Species	Human	Mouse
Entrez	3910	16775
Ensembl	ENSG00000112769	ENSMUSG00000019846
UniProt	Q16363	P97927
RefSeq (mRNA)	NM_001105206; NM_001105207; NM_001105208; NM_001105209; NM_002290	NM_010681
RefSeq (protein)	NP_001098676; NP_001098677; NP_001098678; NP_001098679; NP_002281	NP_034811
Location (UCSC)	Chr 6: 112.11 – 112.25 Mb	Chr 10: 38.84 – 38.99 Mb
PubMed search
- Wikidata
View/Edit Human	View/Edit Mouse

Laminin subunit alpha-4 is a protein that in humans is encoded by the LAMA4 gene.

== Function ==
Laminins, a family of extracellular matrix glycoproteins, are the major noncollagenous constituent of basement membranes. They have been implicated in a wide variety of biological processes including cell adhesion, differentiation, migration, signaling, neurite outgrowth and metastasis.

Laminins are composed of 3 non identical chains: laminin alpha, beta and gamma (formerly A, B1, and B2, respectively) and they form a cruciform structure consisting of 3 short arms, each formed by a different chain, and a long arm composed of all 3 chains. Each laminin chain is a multidomain protein encoded by a distinct gene. Several isoforms of each chain have been described. Different alpha, beta and gamma chain isomers combine to give rise to different heterotrimeric laminin isoforms which are designated by Arabic numerals in the order of their discovery, i.e. alpha1beta1gamma1 heterotrimer is laminin 1. The biological functions of the different chains and trimer molecules are largely unknown, but some of the chains have been shown to differ with respect to their tissue distribution, presumably reflecting diverse functions in vivo.

This gene encodes the alpha chain isoform laminin, alpha 4. The domain structure of alpha 4 is similar to that of alpha 3, both of which resemble truncated versions of alpha 1 and alpha 2, in that approximately 1,200 residues at the N-terminus (domains IV, V and VI) have been lost. Laminin, alpha 4 contains the C-terminal G domain which distinguishes all alpha chains from the beta and gamma chains. The RNA analysis from adult and fetal tissues revealed developmental regulation of expression, however, the exact function of laminin, alpha 4 is not known.

== Gene ==
Tissue-specific utilization of alternative polyA-signal has been described in literature. Also, alternative splicing involving the first intron in the 5' UTR, and laminin alpha 4 like isoforms have been noted, however, the full-length nature of these products is not known.
