= Laminin subunit gamma-3 =

Protein-coding gene in the species Homo sapiens

LAMC3

Identifiers
- Aliases: LAMC3, OCCM, laminin subunit gamma 3
- External IDs: OMIM: 604349; MGI: 1344394; HomoloGene: 21222; GeneCards: LAMC3; OMA:LAMC3 - orthologs

Gene location (Human)
Chr.	Chromosome 9 (human)
Band	9q34.12	Start	131,009,174 bp
Band	9q34.12	End	131,094,473 bp

Gene location (Mouse)
Chr.	Chromosome 2 (mouse)
Band	2|2 B	Start	31,777,303 bp
Band	2|2 B	End	31,836,551 bp
RNA expression pattern
Bgee	Human / Mouse (ortholog); Top expressed in: canal of the cervix; right lung; left testis; upper lobe of left lung; anterior pituitary; right adrenal cortex; ectocervix; right testis; left adrenal gland; left adrenal cortex / Top expressed in: ascending aorta; aortic valve; lip; lumbar subsegment of spinal cord; spermatid; right kidney; visual cortex; dentate gyrus of hippocampal formation granule cell; Gonadal ridge; superior frontal gyrus; More reference expression data
BioGPS	n/a
Gene ontology
Molecular function	structural molecule activity
Cellular component	extracellular region; basement membrane; membrane; extracellular matrix
Biological process	astrocyte development; cell morphogenesis involved in differentiation; cell adhesion; extracellular matrix organization; retina development in camera-type eye; visual perception; animal organ morphogenesis; tissue development; cell migration; substrate adhesion-dependent cell spreading
Sources:Amigo / QuickGO
Orthologs
Species	Human	Mouse
Entrez	10319	23928
Ensembl	ENSG00000050555	ENSMUSG00000026840
UniProt	Q9Y6N6	Q9R0B6
RefSeq (mRNA)	NM_006059	NM_011836
RefSeq (protein)	NP_006050	NP_035966
Location (UCSC)	Chr 9: 131.01 – 131.09 Mb	Chr 2: 31.78 – 31.84 Mb
PubMed search
- Wikidata
View/Edit Human	View/Edit Mouse

Laminin subunit gamma-3 also known as LAMC3 is a protein that in humans is encoded by the LAMC3 gene.

== Function ==
Laminins, a family of extracellular matrix glycoproteins, are the major noncollagenous constituent of basement membranes. They have been implicated in a wide variety of biological processes including cell adhesion, differentiation, migration, signaling, neurite outgrowth and metastasis. Laminins are composed of 3 non identical chains: laminin alpha, beta and gamma (formerly A, B1, and B2, respectively) and they form a cruciform structure consisting of 3 short arms, each formed by a different chain, and a long arm composed of all 3 chains. Each laminin chain is a multidomain protein encoded by a distinct gene. Several isoforms of each chain have been described. Different alpha, beta and gamma chain isomers combine to give rise to different heterotrimeric laminin isoforms which are designated by Arabic numerals in the order of their discovery, i.e. alpha1beta1gamma1 heterotrimer is laminin 1.

The biological functions of the different chains and trimer molecules are largely unknown, but some of the chains have been shown to differ with respect to their tissue distribution, presumably reflecting diverse functions in vivo. This gene encodes the gamma chain isoform laminin, gamma 3. The gamma 3 chain is most similar to the gamma 1 chain, and contains all the 6 domains expected of the gamma chain. It is a component of laminin 12. The gamma 3 chain is broadly expressed in skin, heart, lung, and the reproductive tracts. In skin, it is seen within the basement membrane of the dermoepidermal junction at points of nerve penetration. However, it was also found that the gamma 3 is a prominent element of the apical surface of ciliated epithelial cells of lung, oviduct, epididymis, ductus deferens, and seminiferous tubules. The distribution of gamma 3-containing laminins along ciliated epithelial surfaces suggests that the apical laminins are important in the morphogenesis and structural stability of the ciliated processes of these cells.

A recent study found that LAMC3 plays a critical role in forming the convolution of the cerebral cortex. Particularly LAMC3 is expressed during the embryonic period, which contributes the formation of dendrites.
