= Laryngo-onycho-cutaneous syndrome =

Laryngoonychocutaneous syndrome
- This condition is inherited in an autosomal recessive manner.
- Specialty: Dermatology

Laryngo-onycho-cutaneous syndrome (also known as Shabbir syndrome) is a rare epithelial disorder inherited in an autosomal recessive fashion. It is characterized by abnormalities in the larynx, nails ("onycho-"), and skin ("cutaneous"). The disorder is only found in Punjabi Muslims and only a few cases have been reported.

It was characterized by Pakistani dermatologist Syed Ghulam Shabbir (1923–2002) in 1986.

It may be associated with LAMA3.

== See also ==
- Watson syndrome
- List of cutaneous conditions
