= Laminin database =

Database of non-collagenous extracellular matrix proteins

Content
- Description: high-throughput and curated data on laminins.

Contact
- Research center: National Laboratory of Scientific Computation
- Laboratory: Bioinformatics Laboratory
- Authors: Daiane C F Golbert
- Primary citation: Golbert & al. (2011)
- Release date: 2010

Access
- Website: http://www.lm.lncc.br

The Laminin database is a database of non-collagenous extracellular matrix proteins.

== See also ==
- Laminin
