= Laminin, beta 1 =

Protein-coding gene in the species Homo sapiens

LAMB1
Available structures
PDB	Ortholog search: PDBe RCSB
PDB	List of PDB id codes 4AQS

Identifiers
- Aliases: LAMB1, CLM, LIS5, Laminin, beta 1, laminin subunit beta 1
- External IDs: OMIM: 150240; MGI: 96743; HomoloGene: 1722; GeneCards: LAMB1; OMA:LAMB1 - orthologs

Gene location (Human)
Chr.	Chromosome 7 (human)
Band	7q31.1	Start	107,923,799 bp
Band	7q31.1	End	108,003,213 bp

Gene location (Mouse)
Chr.	Chromosome 12 (mouse)
Band	12 A2|12 13.39 cM	Start	31,315,233 bp
Band	12 A2|12 13.39 cM	End	31,379,643 bp
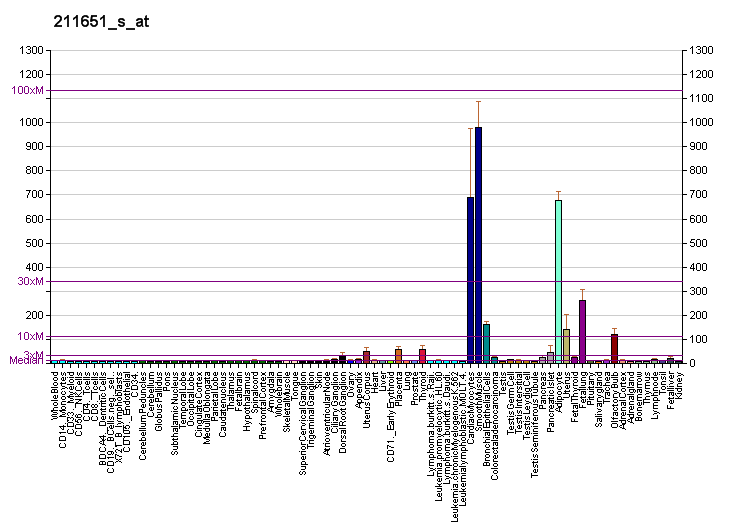

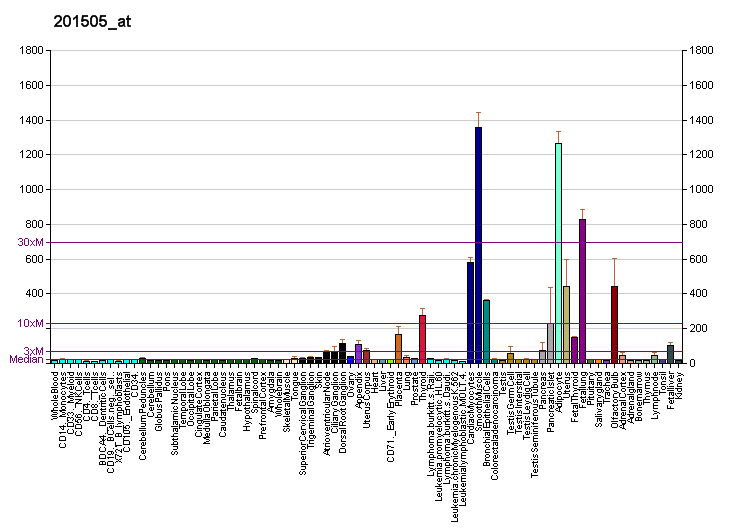
RNA expression pattern
Bgee	Human / Mouse (ortholog); Top expressed in: tibial nerve; right lung; epithelium of colon; muscle layer of sigmoid colon; stromal cell of endometrium; upper lobe of left lung; parietal pleura; sural nerve; left uterine tube; trigeminal ganglion / Top expressed in: external carotid artery; internal carotid artery; primary oocyte; tail of embryo; iris; secondary oocyte; left lung lobe; Gonadal ridge; medullary collecting duct; Epithelium of choroid plexus; More reference expression data
BioGPS	More reference expression data
Gene ontology
Molecular function	extracellular matrix structural constituent; structural molecule activity; protein binding; integrin binding
Cellular component	laminin-8 complex; extracellular matrix; laminin-2 complex; extracellular region; basement membrane; laminin-10 complex; perinuclear region of cytoplasm; laminin-1 complex; extracellular exosome; extracellular space; endoplasmic reticulum lumen; collagen-containing extracellular matrix; laminin complex
Biological process	endodermal cell differentiation; positive regulation of epithelial cell proliferation; positive regulation of cell migration; neuronal-glial interaction involved in cerebral cortex radial glia guided migration; extracellular matrix organization; odontogenesis; cell adhesion; substrate adhesion-dependent cell spreading; neuron projection development; post-translational protein modification; animal organ morphogenesis; tissue development; cell migration; basement membrane assembly
Sources:Amigo / QuickGO
Orthologs
Species	Human	Mouse
Entrez	3912	16777
Ensembl	ENSG00000091136	ENSMUSG00000002900
UniProt	P07942	P02469
RefSeq (mRNA)	NM_002291	NM_008482
RefSeq (protein)	NP_002282	NP_032508
Location (UCSC)	Chr 7: 107.92 – 108 Mb	Chr 12: 31.32 – 31.38 Mb
PubMed search
- Wikidata
View/Edit Human	View/Edit Mouse

Laminin subunit beta-1 is a protein that in humans is encoded by the LAMB1 gene.

Laminins, a family of extracellular matrix glycoproteins, are the major noncollagenous constituent of basement membranes. They have been implicated in a wide variety of biological processes including cell adhesion, differentiation, migration, signaling, neurite outgrowth and metastasis. Laminins are composed of 3 non identical chains: laminin alpha, beta and gamma (formerly A, B1, and B2, respectively) and they form a cruciform structure consisting of 3 short arms, each formed by a different chain, and a long arm composed of all 3 chains. Each laminin chain is a multidomain protein encoded by a distinct gene. Several isoforms of each chain have been described. Different alpha, beta and gamma chain isomers combine to give rise to different heterotrimeric laminin isoforms, which are designated by Arabic numerals in the order of their discovery, i.e. alpha1beta1gamma1 heterotrimer is laminin 1. The biological functions of the different chains and trimer molecules are largely unknown, but some of the chains have been shown to differ with respect to their tissue distribution, presumably reflecting diverse functions in vivo. This gene encodes the beta chain isoform laminin, beta 1. The beta 1 chain has 7 structurally distinct domains, which it shares with other beta chain isomers. The C-terminal helical region containing domains I and II are separated by domain alpha, domains III and V contain several EGF-like repeats, and domains IV and VI have a globular conformation. Laminin, beta 1 is expressed in most tissues that produce basement membranes, and is one of the 3 chains constituting laminin 1, the first laminin isolated from Engelbreth-Holm-Swarm (EHS) tumor. A sequence in the beta 1 chain that is involved in cell attachment, chemotaxis, and binding to the laminin receptor was identified and shown to have the capacity to inhibit metastasis.

5′-UTR of Laminin-B1 harbors IRES (internal ribosome entry site) between −293 and −1 upstream of the start codon. IRES are involved in cancer malignancy.
