= Junctional epidermolysis bullosa (medicine) =

Medical condition

- Specialty: Dermatology

Junctional epidermolysis bullosa is a skin condition characterized by blister formation within the lamina lucida of the basement membrane zone.

== Signs and symptoms ==
People with the condition experience very fragile skin, with blisters and skin erosion occurring in response to relatively benign trauma. Blisters may form all over the body, including the mucous membranes. Chronic scarring can lead to the formation of granulation tissue, which may bleed easily, predisposing to infection. Hands and fingers may be affected, as well as various joints.

== Pathophysiology ==
α6β4 integrin is a transmembrane protein found in hemidesmosomes. As a heterodimer molecule containing two polypeptide chains its extracellular domain enters the basal lamina and interacts with type IV collagen suprastructure containing laminins (laminin-5), entactin/nidogen or the perlecan on the extracellular surface of the hemidesmosome, laminin-5 molecules form threadlike anchoring filaments that extend from the integrin molecules to the structure of the basement membrane of epithelial adhesion. Mutation of the genes encoding laminin-5 chains results in junctional epidermolysis bullosa.

== Diagnosis ==
=== Classification ===
OMIM	Name	Locus	Gene
226730	Junctional epidermolysis bullosa with pyloric atresia	17q11-qter, 2q31.1	ITGB4, ITGA6
226700	Junctional epidermolysis bullosa, Herlitz type	18q11.2, 1q32, 1q25-q31	LAMA3, LAMB3, LAMC2
226650	epidermolysis bullosa, junctional, non-Herlitz types (Generalized atrophic benign epidermolysis bullosa, Mitis junctional epidermolysis bullosa)	18q11.2, 1q32, 17q11-qter, 1q25-q31, 10q24.3	LAMA3, LAMB3, LAMC2, COL17A1, ITGB4

==== Junctional epidermolysis bullosa with pyloric atresia ====
Junctional epidermolysis bullosa with pyloric atresia is a rare autosomal recessive form of junctional epidermolysis bullosa that presents at birth with severe mucocutaneous fragility and gastric outlet obstruction. It can be associated with ITGB4 or ITGA6. This condition is also known as Carmi syndrome.

This condition is rare with ~100 cases reported in the literature.

==== Herlitz type ====
Junctional epidermolysis bullosa gravis (also known as "Herlitz disease", "Herlitz syndrome", and "Lethal junctional epidermolysis bullosa") is the most lethal type of epidermolysis bullosa, a skin condition in which most patients do not survive infancy, characterized by blistering at birth with severe and clinically distinctive periorificial granulation tissue.

JEB-H is generally caused by mutations in one of the three laminin-332 coding genes: LAMA3 (18q11.2), LAMB3 (1q32) and LAMC2 (1q25-q31).

==== Non-Herlitz type ====
These include:

- Generalized atrophic benign epidermolysis bullosa is a skin condition that is characterized by onset at birth, generalized blisters and atrophy, mucosal involvement, and thickened, dystrophic, or absent nails.
- Mitis junctional epidermolysis bullosa (also known as "Nonlethal junctional epidermolysis bullosa") is a skin condition characterized by scalp and nail lesions, also associated with periorificial nonhealing erosions. Mitis junctional epidermolysis bullosa is most commonly seen in children between the ages of 4 and 10 years old.
- Cicatricial junctional epidermolysis bullosa is a skin condition characterized by blisters that heal with scarring. It was characterized in 1985.

== Treatment ==
In 2015, an Italian team of scientists, led by Michele De Luca at the University of Modena, successfully treated a seven-year-old Syrian boy who had lost 80% of his skin. The boy's family had fled Syria for Germany in 2013. Upon seeking treatment in Germany, he had lost the epidermis from almost his entire body, with only his head and a patch on his left leg remaining. The group of Italian scientists had previously pioneered a technique to regenerate healthy skin in the laboratory. They used this treatment on the boy by taking a sample from his remaining healthy skin and then genetically modifying the skin cells, using a virus to deliver a healthy version of the LAMB3 gene into the nuclei. The patient underwent two operations in autumn 2015, where the new epidermis was attached. The graft had integrated into the lower layers of skin within a month, and the modified epidermal stem cells sustained this transgenic epidermis, curing the boy. The introduction of genetic changes could increase the chances of skin cancer in other patients, but if the treatment is deemed safe in the long term, scientists believe the approach could be used to treat other skin disorders.

The use of gentamicin has been shown to provide some attenuation of this disease.

=== Birch triterpenes ===
Chemical structure of betulin, one of the primary constituents of birch triterpenes

Birch triterpenes, sold under the brand name Filsuvez, is an extract of birch bark used as a topical medication for the treatment of epidermolysis bullosa. The active ingredients are triterpenes extracted from the outer bark of silver birch (Betula pendula) and downy birch (Betula pubescens).

The most common side effects include wound complications such as skin reactions at the application site, infections, pruritus (itching), and hypersensitivity.

Birch triterpenes was approved for medical use in the European Union in June 2022, and in the United States in December 2023.

== See also ==
- Junctional epidermolysis bullosa (veterinary medicine)
- Skin lesion
