= Laminin, alpha 3 =

Protein-coding gene in the species Homo sapiens

LAMA3

Identifiers
- Aliases: LAMA3, BM600, E170, LAMNA, LOCS, lama3a, Laminin, alpha 3, laminin subunit alpha 3, JEB2B, JEB2A, JEB2C
- External IDs: OMIM: 600805; MGI: 99909; GeneCards: LAMA3

Gene location (Human)
Chr.	Chromosome 18 (human)
Band	18q11.2	Start	23,689,453 bp
Band	18q11.2	End	23,956,222 bp

Gene location (Mouse)
Chr.	Chromosome 18 (mouse)
Band	18 A1|18 6.2 cM	Start	12,466,876 bp
Band	18 A1|18 6.2 cM	End	12,716,070 bp
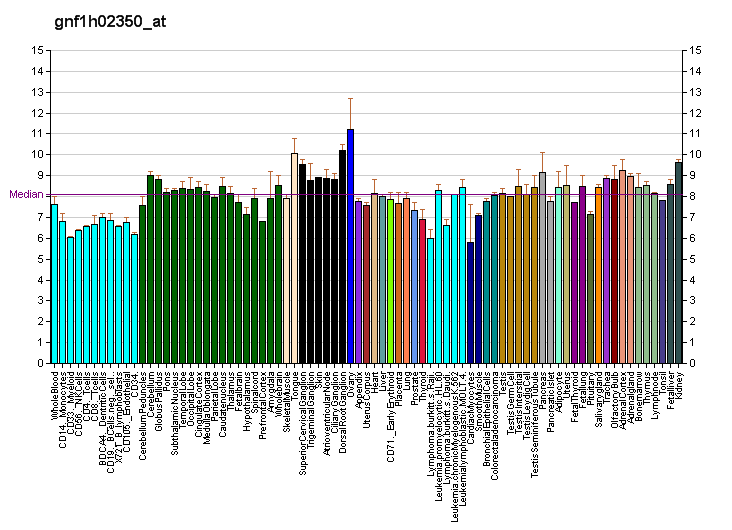

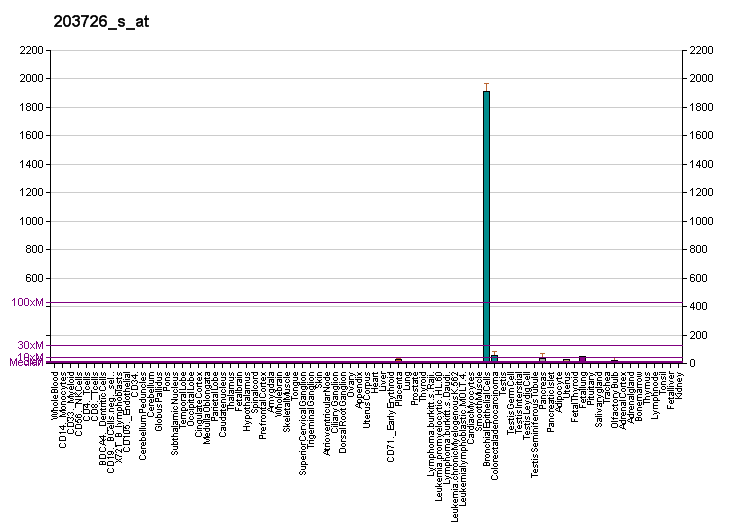

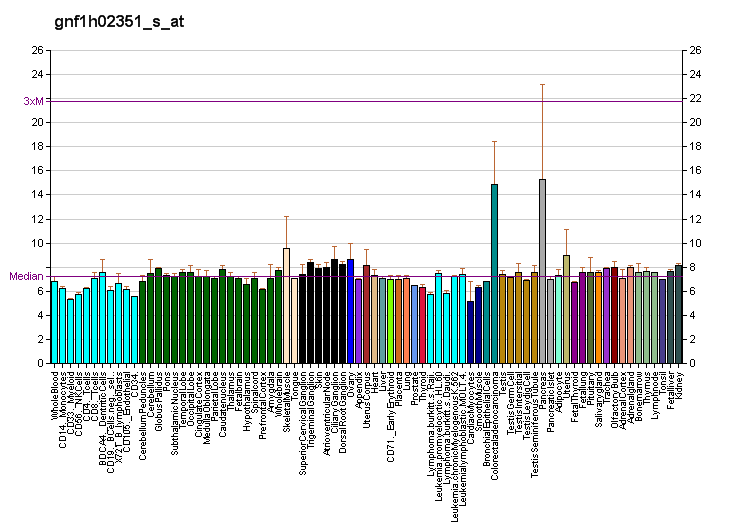
RNA expression pattern
Bgee	Human / Mouse (ortholog); Top expressed in: right lung; skin of leg; periodontal fiber; skin of abdomen; mucosa of sigmoid colon; jejunal mucosa; decidua; sural nerve; upper lobe of left lung; minor salivary glands / Top expressed in: molar; corneal stroma; left lung lobe; right lung lobe; transitional epithelium of urinary bladder; skin of external ear; conjunctival fornix; left colon; ileum; skin of back; More reference expression data
BioGPS	More reference expression data
Gene ontology
Molecular function	signaling receptor binding; structural molecule activity; extracellular matrix structural constituent; integrin binding
Cellular component	extracellular region; basement membrane; laminin-5 complex; extracellular exosome; extracellular matrix; endoplasmic reticulum; collagen-containing extracellular matrix
Biological process	hemidesmosome assembly; cell adhesion; extracellular matrix disassembly; regulation of cell adhesion; extracellular matrix organization; regulation of cell migration; endodermal cell differentiation; regulation of embryonic development; epidermis development; morphogenesis of a polarized epithelium; integrin-mediated signaling pathway; animal organ morphogenesis; tissue development; cell migration; cell-cell adhesion
Sources:Amigo / QuickGO
Orthologs
Databases	NCBI: entry; OMA: entry
Species	Human	Mouse
Entrez	3909	16774
Ensembl	ENSG00000053747	ENSMUSG00000024421
UniProt	Q16787	Q61789
RefSeq (mRNA)	NM_000227; NM_001127717; NM_001127718; NM_001302996; NM_198129	NM_010680; NM_001347461
RefSeq (protein)	NP_000218; NP_001121189; NP_001121190; NP_001289925; NP_937762	NP_001334390; NP_034810
Location (UCSC)	Chr 18: 23.69 – 23.96 Mb	Chr 18: 12.47 – 12.72 Mb
PubMed search
- Wikidata
View/Edit Human	View/Edit Mouse

Laminin subunit alpha-3 is a protein that in humans is encoded by the LAMA3 gene.

== Function ==
Laminins are basement membrane components thought to mediate the attachment, migration and organization of cells into tissues during embryonic development by interacting with other extracellular matrix components. The protein encoded by this gene is the alpha-3 chain of laminin 5, which is a complex glycoprotein composed of three subunits (alpha, beta, and gamma). Alternatively spliced transcript variants encoding different isoforms have been identified.

Laminin 5 is thought to be involved in cell adhesion, signal transduction and differentiation of keratinocytes.

== Clinical significance ==
Mutations in this gene have been identified as the cause of Herlitz type junctional epidermolysis bullosa.

It may be associated with Laryngoonychocutaneous syndrome.

== Interactions ==
Laminin, alpha 3 has been shown to interact with SDC2.
