= Laminin, alpha 5 =

Protein-coding gene in the species Homo sapiens

LAMA5

Identifiers
- Aliases: LAMA5, Laminin, alpha 5, laminin subunit alpha 5
- External IDs: OMIM: 601033; MGI: 105382; GeneCards: LAMA5
Available structures
PDB	Ortholog search: PDBe RCSB
PDB	List of PDB id codes 2Y38

Gene location (Human)
Chr.	Chromosome 20 (human)
Band	20q13.33	Start	62,307,955 bp
Band	20q13.33	End	62,367,312 bp

Gene location (Mouse)
Chr.	Chromosome 2 (mouse)
Band	2 H4|2 102.7 cM	Start	179,818,166 bp
Band	2 H4|2 102.7 cM	End	179,867,652 bp
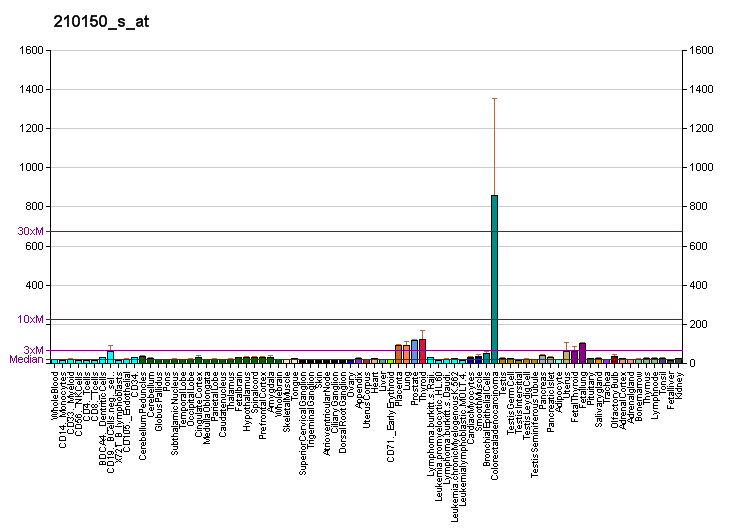
RNA expression pattern
Bgee	Human / Mouse (ortholog); Top expressed in: right uterine tube; right hemisphere of cerebellum; right lung; right coronary artery; popliteal artery; tibial arteries; muscle layer of sigmoid colon; gastric mucosa; upper lobe of left lung; skin of abdomen / Top expressed in: gastrula; decidua; ascending aorta; medullary collecting duct; left lung lobe; epiblast; blastocyst; molar; aortic valve; islet of Langerhans; More reference expression data
BioGPS	More reference expression data
Gene ontology
Molecular function	structural molecule activity; integrin binding; signaling receptor binding; extracellular matrix structural constituent
Cellular component	extracellular matrix; laminin-5 complex; extracellular region; basement membrane; laminin-10 complex; laminin-11 complex; extracellular exosome; nucleus; extracellular space; synaptic cleft; neuromuscular junction; collagen-containing extracellular matrix
Biological process	hair follicle development; cell differentiation; regulation of embryonic development; regulation of cell migration; cell recognition; embryo development; lung development; muscle organ development; extracellular matrix organization; morphogenesis of a polarized epithelium; odontogenesis of dentin-containing tooth; focal adhesion assembly; branching involved in ureteric bud morphogenesis; regulation of cell adhesion; cell adhesion; regulation of cell population proliferation; cytoskeleton organization; angiogenesis; neural crest cell migration; animal organ morphogenesis; integrin-mediated signaling pathway; endothelial cell differentiation; substrate adhesion-dependent cell spreading; morphogenesis of embryonic epithelium; cell population proliferation; cell migration; branching morphogenesis of an epithelial tube; branching involved in salivary gland morphogenesis; cilium assembly; protein localization to plasma membrane; cytokine-mediated signaling pathway; tissue development; cell-cell adhesion
Sources:Amigo / QuickGO
Orthologs
Databases	NCBI: entry; OMA: entry
Species	Human	Mouse
Entrez	3911	16776
Ensembl	ENSG00000130702	ENSMUSG00000015647
UniProt	O15230	Q61001
RefSeq (mRNA)	NM_005560	NM_001081171
RefSeq (protein)	NP_005551	NP_001074640
Location (UCSC)	Chr 20: 62.31 – 62.37 Mb	Chr 2: 179.82 – 179.87 Mb
PubMed search
- Wikidata
View/Edit Human	View/Edit Mouse

Laminin subunit alpha-5 is a protein that in humans is encoded by the LAMA5 gene.

== Function ==
Components of the extracellular matrix exert myriad effects on tissues throughout the body. In particular, the laminins, a family of heterotrimeric extracellular glycoproteins, affect tissue development and integrity in such diverse organs as the kidney, lung, skin, and nervous system. It is thought that laminins mediate the attachment, migration, and organization of cells into tissues during embryonic development by interacting with other extracellular matrix components. Laminins function as heterotrimeric complexes of alpha, beta, and gamma chains, with each chain type representing a different subfamily of proteins. The protein encoded by this gene belongs to the alpha subfamily of laminin chains and is a major component of basement membranes. Two transcript variants encoding different isoforms have been found for this gene, but the full-length nature of one of them has not been determined.

== Interactions ==
Laminin, alpha 5 has been shown to interact with BCAM.
