= LMNA-related congenital muscular dystrophy =

- Other names: Congenital muscular dystrophy due to LMNA mutation
- Specialty: Neurology

Lamin A/C congenital muscular dystrophy (CMD) (L-CMD, congenital muscular dystrophy associated to the LMNA gene or Emery-Dreifuss muscular dystrophy II) is a disease that it is included in laminopathies. Laminopathies are caused, among other mutations, to mutations in LMNA, a gene that synthesizes lamins A and C.

Currently there are approximately 200 cases worldwide.

This illness implies, like other muscular dystrophies, muscle weakness, motor difficulties and lack of control in the movement of the head, respiratory failure and cardiac abnormalities and symptoms are usually evident before the age of 2.

It can be an autosomal dominant inherited disease that affects both male and female but most known cases are de-novo mutations (spontaneous mutation) and are therefore not inherited. It is dominantly inherited because the abnormal gene would dominate beyond the normal one and it would transmit the disease. But it can also be recessive inheritance, which means that parents would carry the disease but it would not appear.Therefore, although parents have normal genes, children who are affected by mutations will have kids that would suffer the same disease as it is transmitted through heredity. This dystrophy was discovered thanks to geneticist, Gisèle Bonne, who identified the first mutation of the LMNA gene in 1999.

== Symptoms ==
In general, the symptoms are:

- Muscle weakness.
- Difficulty in motor acquisitions or absence of them.
- Poor control of the head and spinal rigidity in the cervical area.
- Respiratory difficulties and cardiac disorders such as arrhythmias and cardiac dilatation, which can both cause a sudden death.

== Genetics ==
Mutations on this gene are responsible for congenital muscular dystrophy (CMD), overlapping syndromes related to mutation have also been reported. It is located on the long arm of the chromosome 1 (1q21-q22) and encodes the proteins lamin A and lamin C. These are structural proteins of intermediate filaments that provide stability and strength to the cells. They play an important role in the organization of chromatin and nuclear membrane. A-type lamins promote genetic stability by maintaining levels of proteins that have key roles in non-homologous end joining and homologous recombination, processes that repair DNA double-strand breaks.

== Diagnosis ==
Unlike most muscular dystrophies, lamin A/C CMD does not present a breakdown of muscular fibres caused by muscle degeneration.

The only certain way to diagnose this disease is with molecular techniques like LMNA gene sequencing.

== Treatment ==
There is no cure for CMD. Symptoms are managed for each individual and may involve the coordination of several healthcare specialists.

== Prognosis ==
There is an open prognosis because this disease has an unknown evolution. The cure of the disease could be found through some advanced therapies such as CRISPR/Cas9.

== See also ==
- Muscular dystrophy
