= Netrin G2 =

Protein-coding gene in the species Homo sapiens

NTNG2

Identifiers
- Aliases: NTNG2, LHLL9381, Lmnt2, NTNG1, bA479K20.1, netrin G2, NEDBASH
- External IDs: MGI: 2159341; GeneCards: NTNG2
Available structures
PDB	Ortholog search: PDBe RCSB
PDB	List of PDB id codes 3TBD, 3ZYG, 3ZYI

Gene location (Human)
Chr.	Chromosome 9 (human)
Band	9q34.13	Start	132,162,058 bp
Band	9q34.13	End	132,244,526 bp

Gene location (Mouse)
Chr.	Chromosome 2 (mouse)
Band	2 B|2 19.57 cM	Start	29,084,553 bp
Band	2 B|2 19.57 cM	End	29,143,017 bp
RNA expression pattern
Bgee	Human / Mouse (ortholog); Top expressed in: pancreatic ductal cell; monocyte; blood; anterior cingulate cortex; C1 segment; right frontal lobe; amygdala; granulocyte; Brodmann area 9; prefrontal cortex / Top expressed in: granulocyte; neural layer of retina; dentate gyrus of hippocampal formation granule cell; primary visual cortex; superior frontal gyrus; lens; muscle of thigh; lip; esophagus; ventricular zone; More reference expression data
BioGPS	n/a
Gene ontology
Molecular function	protein binding; molecular function
Cellular component	anchored component of membrane; axon; anchored component of plasma membrane; membrane; extracellular region; cytosol; plasma membrane; intercellular bridge; Flemming body; Schaffer collateral - CA1 synapse; glutamatergic synapse; anchored component of presynaptic active zone membrane
Biological process	multicellular organism development; cell differentiation; axonogenesis; nervous system development; modulation of chemical synaptic transmission; postsynaptic specialization assembly; synaptic membrane adhesion; regulation of presynapse assembly; motor neuron axon guidance; animal organ morphogenesis; tissue development
Sources:Amigo / QuickGO
Orthologs
Databases	NCBI: entry; OMA: entry
Species	Human	Mouse
Entrez	84628	171171
Ensembl	ENSG00000196358	ENSMUSG00000035513
UniProt	Q96CW9	Q8R4F1
RefSeq (mRNA)	NM_032536	NM_133500; NM_133501; NM_001305805
RefSeq (protein)	NP_115925	NP_001292734; NP_598007; NP_598008
Location (UCSC)	Chr 9: 132.16 – 132.24 Mb	Chr 2: 29.08 – 29.14 Mb
PubMed search
- Wikidata
View/Edit Human	View/Edit Mouse

Netrin-G2 is a protein that in humans is encoded by the NTNG2 gene.
