= Mucin 3A =

Protein-coding gene in the species Homo sapiens

MUC3A

Identifiers
- Aliases: MUC3A, MUC-3A, MUC3, mucin 3A, cell surface associated
- External IDs: OMIM: 158371; MGI: 3588263; GeneCards: MUC3A

Gene location (Human)
Chr.	Chromosome 7 (human)
Band	7q22.1	Start	100,949,534 bp
Band	7q22.1	End	100,968,347 bp

Gene location (Mouse)
Chr.	Chromosome 5 (mouse)
Band	5|5	Start	137,208,813 bp
Band	5|5	End	137,212,389 bp
RNA expression pattern
Bgee	Human / Mouse (ortholog); Top expressed in: mucosa of transverse colon; rectum; mucosa of ileum; jejunal mucosa; duodenum; gallbladder; mucosa of sigmoid colon; epithelium of colon; right lobe of liver; prostate / Top expressed in: ileum; duodenum; jejunum; colon; striatum of neuraxis; superior frontal gyrus; olfactory bulb; primary visual cortex; granulocyte; cerebellum; More reference expression data
BioGPS	n/a
Gene ontology
Molecular function	extracellular matrix constituent, lubricant activity; extracellular matrix structural constituent
Cellular component	Golgi lumen; integral component of membrane; extracellular region; membrane; plasma membrane
Biological process	O-glycan processing; stimulatory C-type lectin receptor signaling pathway
Sources:Amigo / QuickGO
Orthologs
Databases	NCBI: entry; OMA: entry
Species	Human	Mouse
Entrez	4584	619309
Ensembl	ENSG00000169894	ENSMUSG00000094840
UniProt	Q02505	n/a
RefSeq (mRNA)	NM_005960	XM_030254983
RefSeq (protein)	NP_005951	n/a
Location (UCSC)	Chr 7: 100.95 – 100.97 Mb	Chr 5: 137.21 – 137.21 Mb
PubMed search
- Wikidata
View/Edit Human	View/Edit Mouse

Mucin 3A is a protein that in humans is encoded by the MUC3A gene.
