= Laminin, beta 3 =

Protein found in humans

LAMB3

Identifiers
- Aliases: LAMB3, BM600-125KDA, LAM5, LAMNB1, AI1A, Laminin, beta 3, laminin subunit beta 3, JEB1B, JEB1A
- External IDs: OMIM: 150310; MGI: 99915; GeneCards: LAMB3

Gene location (Human)
Chr.	Chromosome 1 (human)
Band	1q32.2	Start	209,614,870 bp
Band	1q32.2	End	209,652,425 bp

Gene location (Mouse)
Chr.	Chromosome 1 (mouse)
Band	1 H6|1 97.71 cM	Start	192,890,007 bp
Band	1 H6|1 97.71 cM	End	193,026,186 bp
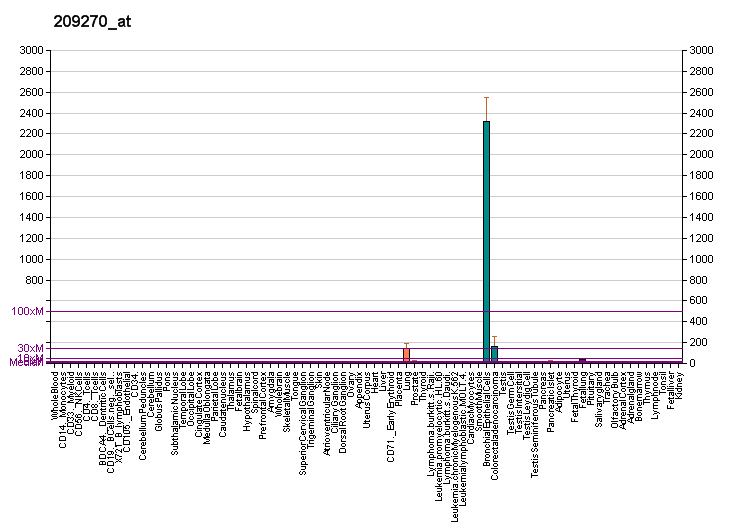
RNA expression pattern
Bgee	Human / Mouse (ortholog); Top expressed in: cartilage tissue; periodontal fiber; gingival epithelium; olfactory zone of nasal mucosa; jejunal mucosa; mucosa of transverse colon; skin of leg; mucosa of ileum; skin of abdomen; mucosa of esophagus / Top expressed in: molar; epithelium of stomach; left colon; granulocyte; corneal stroma; transitional epithelium of urinary bladder; lip; left lung; mucous cell of stomach; lactiferous gland; More reference expression data
BioGPS	More reference expression data
Gene ontology
Molecular function	protein binding; structural molecule activity; protein-containing complex binding; extracellular matrix structural constituent
Cellular component	extracellular region; basement membrane; laminin-5 complex; collagen-containing extracellular matrix; laminin complex
Biological process	hemidesmosome assembly; cell adhesion; extracellular matrix organization; endodermal cell differentiation; brown fat cell differentiation; epidermis development; animal organ morphogenesis; tissue development; cell migration; substrate adhesion-dependent cell spreading; basement membrane assembly
Sources:Amigo / QuickGO
Orthologs
Databases	NCBI: entry; OMA: entry
Species	Human	Mouse
Entrez	3914	16780
Ensembl	ENSG00000196878	ENSMUSG00000026639
UniProt	Q13751	Q61087
RefSeq (mRNA)	NM_000228; NM_001017402; NM_001127641	NM_001277928; NM_008484
RefSeq (protein)	NP_000219; NP_001017402; NP_001121113	NP_001264857; NP_032510
Location (UCSC)	Chr 1: 209.61 – 209.65 Mb	Chr 1: 192.89 – 193.03 Mb
PubMed search
- Wikidata
View/Edit Human	View/Edit Mouse

Laminin subunit beta-3 is a protein that in humans is encoded by the LAMB3 gene.

LAMB3 encodes the beta 3 subunit of laminin. Laminin is composed of three subunits (alpha, beta, and gamma), and refers to a family of basement membrane proteins. For example, LAMB3 serves as the beta chain in laminin-5. Mutations in LAMB3 have been identified as the cause of various types of epidermolysis bullosa. Two alternatively spliced transcript variants encoding the same protein have been found for this gene.
