= Laminin subunit gamma-1 =

Protein found in humans

LAMC1
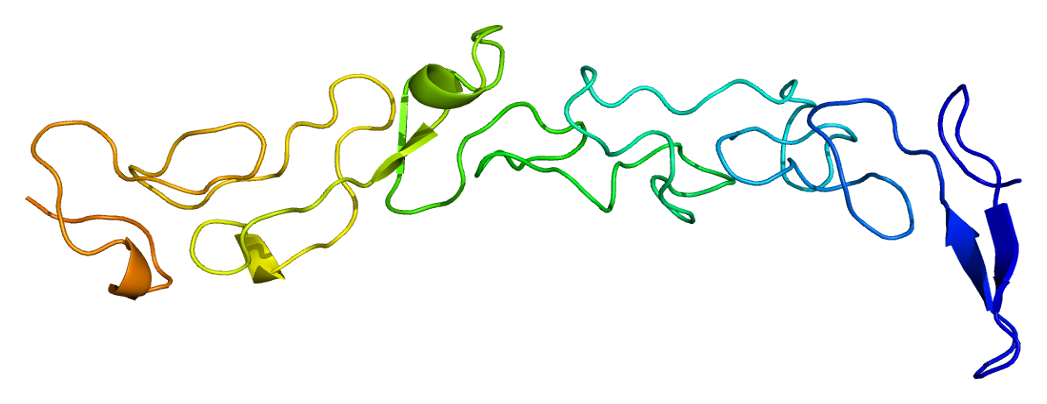

Identifiers
- Aliases: LAMC1, LAMB2, Laminin, gamma 1, laminin subunit gamma 1
- External IDs: OMIM: 150290; MGI: 99914; GeneCards: LAMC1
Available structures
PDB	Ortholog search: PDBe RCSB
PDB	List of PDB id codes 1KLO, 1NPE, 1TLE, 4AQT

Gene location (Human)
Chr.	Chromosome 1 (human)
Band	1q25.3	Start	183,023,420 bp
Band	1q25.3	End	183,145,592 bp

Gene location (Mouse)
Chr.	Chromosome 1 (mouse)
Band	1 G3|1 65.3 cM	Start	153,094,668 bp
Band	1 G3|1 65.3 cM	End	153,208,532 bp
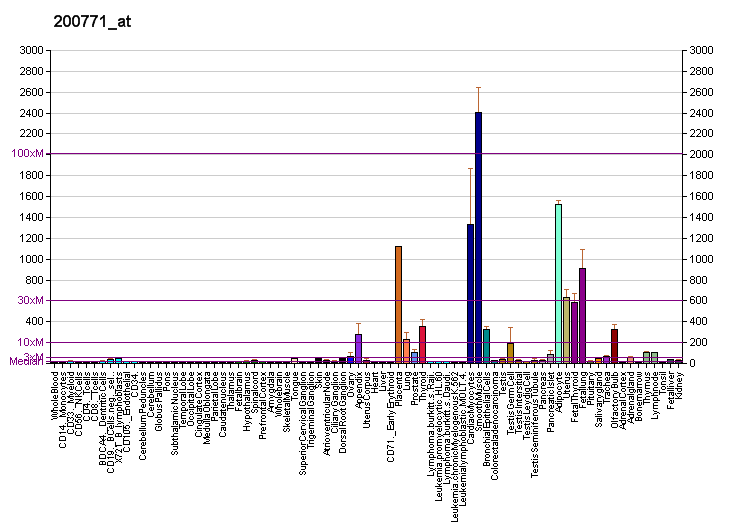

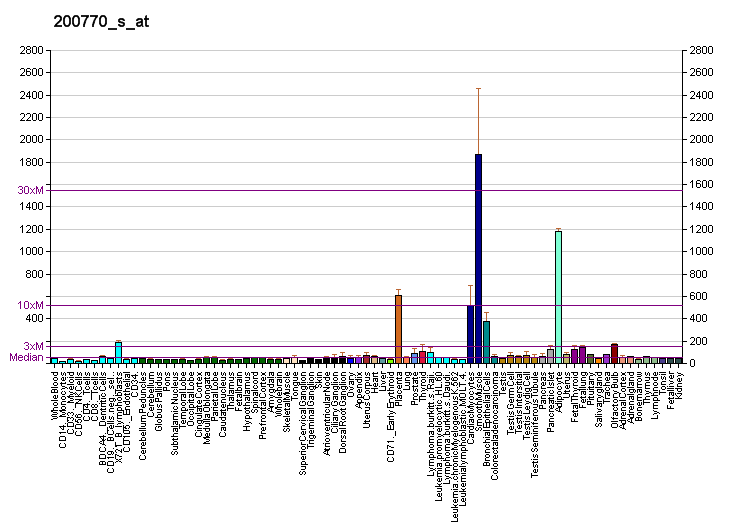
RNA expression pattern
Bgee	Human / Mouse (ortholog); Top expressed in: stromal cell of endometrium; visceral pleura; parietal pleura; Achilles tendon; sural nerve; saphenous vein; placenta; gastric mucosa; skin of hip; urethra / Top expressed in: gastrula; ascending aorta; decidua; aortic valve; tail of embryo; molar; left lung lobe; atrium; yolk sac; genital tubercle; More reference expression data
BioGPS	More reference expression data
Gene ontology
Molecular function	extracellular matrix structural constituent; extracellular matrix constituent conferring elasticity
Cellular component	extracellular matrix; extracellular region; basement membrane; laminin-1 complex; extracellular exosome; laminin-10 complex; laminin-11 complex; extracellular space; endoplasmic reticulum lumen; collagen-containing extracellular matrix
Biological process	hemidesmosome assembly; substrate adhesion-dependent cell spreading; endoderm development; cell adhesion; extracellular matrix organization; cell migration; positive regulation of epithelial cell proliferation; extracellular matrix disassembly; post-translational protein modification; protein-containing complex assembly; animal organ morphogenesis; tissue development; organism system development; basement membrane assembly
Sources:Amigo / QuickGO
Orthologs
Databases	NCBI: entry; OMA: entry
Species	Human	Mouse
Entrez	3915	226519
Ensembl	ENSG00000135862	ENSMUSG00000026478
UniProt	P11047	P02468
RefSeq (mRNA)	NM_002293	NM_010683
RefSeq (protein)	NP_002284	n/a
Location (UCSC)	Chr 1: 183.02 – 183.15 Mb	Chr 1: 153.09 – 153.21 Mb
PubMed search
- Wikidata
View/Edit Human	View/Edit Mouse

Laminin subunit gamma-1 is a protein that in humans is encoded by the LAMC1 gene.

Laminins, a family of extracellular matrix glycoproteins, are the major noncollagenous constituent of basement membranes. They have been implicated in a wide variety of biological processes including cell adhesion, differentiation, migration, signaling, neurite outgrowth and metastasis. Laminins are composed of 3 non identical chains: laminin alpha, beta and gamma (formerly A, B1, and B2, respectively) and they form a cruciform structure consisting of 3 short arms, each formed by a different chain, and a long arm composed of all 3 chains. Each laminin chain is a multidomain protein encoded by a distinct gene. Several isoforms of each chain have been described. Different alpha, beta and gamma chain isomers combine to give rise to different heterotrimeric laminin isoforms which are designated by Arabic numerals in the order of their discovery, i.e. alpha1beta1gamma1 heterotrimer is laminin 1. The biological functions of the different chains and trimer molecules are largely unknown, but some of the chains have been shown to differ with respect to their tissue distribution, presumably reflecting diverse functions in vivo. This gene encodes the gamma chain isoform laminin, gamma 1. The gamma 1 chain, formerly thought to be a beta chain, contains structural domains similar to beta chains, however, lacks the short alpha region separating domains I and II. The structural organization of this gene also suggested that it had diverged considerably from the beta chain genes. Embryos of transgenic mice in which both alleles of the gamma 1 chain gene were inactivated by homologous recombination, lacked basement membranes, indicating that laminin, gamma 1 chain is necessary for laminin heterotrimer assembly. It has been inferred by analogy with the strikingly similar 3' UTR sequence in mouse laminin gamma 1 cDNA, that multiple polyadenylation sites are utilized in human to generate the 2 different sized mRNAs (5.5 and 7.5 kb) seen on Northern analysis.
