= Laminin, beta 2 =

Protein-coding gene in the species Homo sapiens

LAMB2

Identifiers
- Aliases: LAMB2, LAMS, NPHS5, Laminin, beta 2, laminin subunit beta 2, PIERS
- External IDs: OMIM: 150325; MGI: 99916; HomoloGene: 1723; GeneCards: LAMB2; OMA:LAMB2 - orthologs

Gene location (Human)
Chr.	Chromosome 3 (human)
Band	3p21.31	Start	49,121,114 bp
Band	3p21.31	End	49,133,118 bp

Gene location (Mouse)
Chr.	Chromosome 9 (mouse)
Band	9 F2|9 59.4 cM	Start	108,356,935 bp
Band	9 F2|9 59.4 cM	End	108,367,729 bp
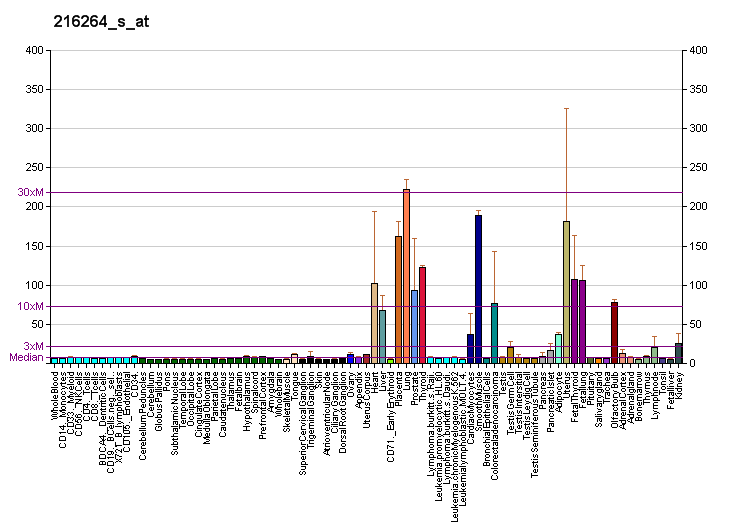
RNA expression pattern
Bgee	Human / Mouse (ortholog); Top expressed in: apex of heart; right lobe of thyroid gland; stromal cell of endometrium; right ovary; left ovary; right adrenal cortex; left lobe of thyroid gland; ascending aorta; Descending thoracic aorta; canal of the cervix / Top expressed in: gastrula; decidua; external carotid artery; muscle of thigh; tunica media of zone of aorta; internal carotid artery; ascending aorta; ankle joint; myocardium of ventricle; lip; More reference expression data
BioGPS	More reference expression data
Gene ontology
Molecular function	structural molecule activity; integrin binding; extracellular matrix structural constituent
Cellular component	extracellular matrix; synapse; extracellular region; basement membrane; laminin-3 complex; laminin-11 complex; extracellular exosome; laminin complex; extracellular space; synaptic cleft; endoplasmic reticulum lumen; neuromuscular junction; collagen-containing extracellular matrix
Biological process	metanephric glomerular visceral epithelial cell development; astrocyte development; Schwann cell development; synapse organization; axon extension involved in regeneration; extracellular matrix organization; axon guidance; cell adhesion; neuromuscular junction development; retina development in camera-type eye; metanephric glomerular basement membrane development; cell morphogenesis involved in differentiation; neuron projection development; visual perception; post-translational protein modification; animal organ morphogenesis; tissue development; cell migration; substrate adhesion-dependent cell spreading; basement membrane assembly
Sources:Amigo / QuickGO
Orthologs
Species	Human	Mouse
Entrez	3913	16779
Ensembl	ENSG00000172037	ENSMUSG00000052911
UniProt	P55268	Q61292
RefSeq (mRNA)	NM_002292	NM_008483
RefSeq (protein)	NP_002283	NP_032509
Location (UCSC)	Chr 3: 49.12 – 49.13 Mb	Chr 9: 108.36 – 108.37 Mb
PubMed search
- Wikidata
View/Edit Human	View/Edit Mouse

Laminin subunit beta-2 is a protein that in humans is encoded by the LAMB2 gene.

== Function ==
Laminins, a family of extracellular matrix glycoproteins, are the major noncollagenous constituent of basement membranes. They have been implicated in a wide variety of biological processes including cell adhesion, differentiation, migration, signaling, neurite outgrowth and metastasis. Laminins are composed of 3 non identical chains: laminin alpha, beta and gamma (formerly A, B1, and B2, respectively) and they form a cruciform structure consisting of 3 short arms, each formed by a different chain, and a long arm composed of all 3 chains. Each laminin chain is a multidomain protein encoded by a distinct gene. Several isoforms of each chain have been described. Different alpha, beta and gamma chain isomers combine to give rise to different heterotrimeric laminin isoforms, which were formerly designated by Arabic numerals in the order of their discovery, e.g. alpha1beta1gamma1 heterotrimer was known as laminin 1, but the nomenclature now calls for using the numbers of each individual laminin subunit isoform, e.g. what was formerly Laminin 1 is now Laminin 111, and what was formerly Laminin 5 is now Laminin 332. The biological functions of the different chains and trimer molecules are largely unknown, but some of the chains have been shown to differ with respect to their tissue distribution, presumably reflecting diverse functions in vivo. This gene encodes the beta chain isoform laminin, beta 2. The beta 2 chain contains the 7 structural domains typical of beta chains of laminin, including the short alpha region. However, unlike beta 1 chain, beta 2 has a more restricted tissue distribution. It is enriched in the basement membrane of muscles at the neuromuscular junctions, kidney glomerulus and vascular smooth muscle. Transgenic mice in which the beta 2 chain gene was inactivated by homologous recombination, showed defects in the maturation of neuromuscular junctions and impairment of glomerular filtration. Alternative splicing involving a non consensus 5' splice site (gc) in the 5' UTR of this gene has been reported. It was suggested that inefficient splicing of this first intron, which does not change the protein sequence, results in a greater abundance of the un
