= Netrin G1 =

Protein found in humans

NTNG1

Identifiers
- Aliases: NTNG1, Lmnt1, netrin G1
- External IDs: OMIM: 608818; MGI: 1934028; GeneCards: NTNG1
Available structures
PDB	Ortholog search: PDBe RCSB
PDB	List of PDB id codes 3ZYJ

Gene location (Human)
Chr.	Chromosome 1 (human)
Band	1p13.3	Start	107,140,007 bp
Band	1p13.3	End	107,484,923 bp

Gene location (Mouse)
Chr.	Chromosome 3 (mouse)
Band	3|3 F3	Start	109,687,356 bp
Band	3|3 F3	End	110,051,327 bp
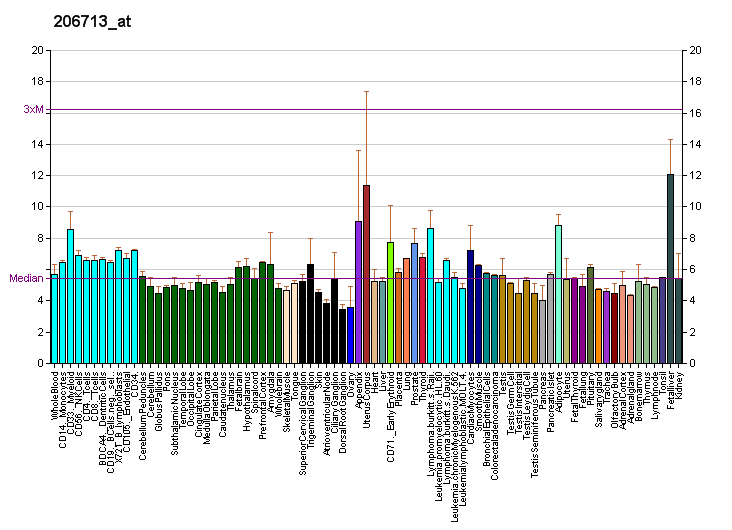
RNA expression pattern
Bgee	Human / Mouse (ortholog); Top expressed in: lateral nuclear group of thalamus; buccal mucosa cell; Brodmann area 23; middle temporal gyrus; primary visual cortex; gonad; testicle; germinal epithelium; entorhinal cortex; superior frontal gyrus / Top expressed in: medial dorsal nucleus; medial geniculate nucleus; lateral geniculate nucleus; sciatic nerve; nucleus of stria terminalis; subiculum; piriform cortex; ventral tegmental area; habenula; inferior colliculi; More reference expression data
BioGPS	More reference expression data
Gene ontology
Molecular function	protein binding; cell adhesion molecule binding; cell-cell adhesion mediator activity
Cellular component	anchored component of membrane; anchored component of plasma membrane; membrane; extracellular region; plasma membrane; Schaffer collateral - CA1 synapse; glutamatergic synapse; anchored component of presynaptic active zone membrane
Biological process	multicellular organism development; cell differentiation; axonogenesis; nervous system development; C-terminal protein lipidation; modulation of chemical synaptic transmission; synaptic membrane adhesion; motor neuron axon guidance; animal organ morphogenesis; tissue development
Sources:Amigo / QuickGO
Orthologs
Databases	NCBI: entry; OMA: entry
Species	Human	Mouse
Entrez	22854	80883
Ensembl	ENSG00000162631	ENSMUSG00000059857
UniProt	Q9Y2I2	Q8R4G0
RefSeq (mRNA)	NM_001113226; NM_001113228; NM_001312688; NM_014917; NM_001330665 NM_001372166; NM_001372167; NM_001372168; NM_001372169; NM_001372170; NM_001372171	NM_001163348; NM_001163349; NM_001163350; NM_001163351; NM_030699 NM_133488
RefSeq (protein)	NP_001106697; NP_001106699; NP_001299617; NP_001317594; NP_055732 NP_001359095; NP_001359096; NP_001359097; NP_001359098; NP_001359099; NP_001359100	NP_001156820; NP_001156821; NP_001156822; NP_109624; NP_597995
Location (UCSC)	Chr 1: 107.14 – 107.48 Mb	Chr 3: 109.69 – 110.05 Mb
PubMed search
- Wikidata
View/Edit Human	View/Edit Mouse

Netrin-G1 is a protein that in humans is encoded by the NTNG1 gene.

Netrin G1 (NTNG1) belongs to a conserved family of proteins that act as axon guidance cues during vertebrate nervous system development (Nakashiba et al., 2000).[supplied by OMIM]
