= NELL2 =

Protein-coding gene in the species Homo sapiens

Identifiers
- Aliases: NELL2, NRP2, neural EGFL like 2
- External IDs: OMIM: 602320; MGI: 1858510; GeneCards: NELL2

Gene location (Human)
Chr.	Chromosome 12 (human)
Band	12q12	Start	44,508,275 bp
Band	12q12	End	44,921,848 bp

Gene location (Mouse)
Chr.	Chromosome 15 (mouse)
Band	15|15 E3	Start	94,973,111 bp
Band	15|15 E3	End	95,426,440 bp
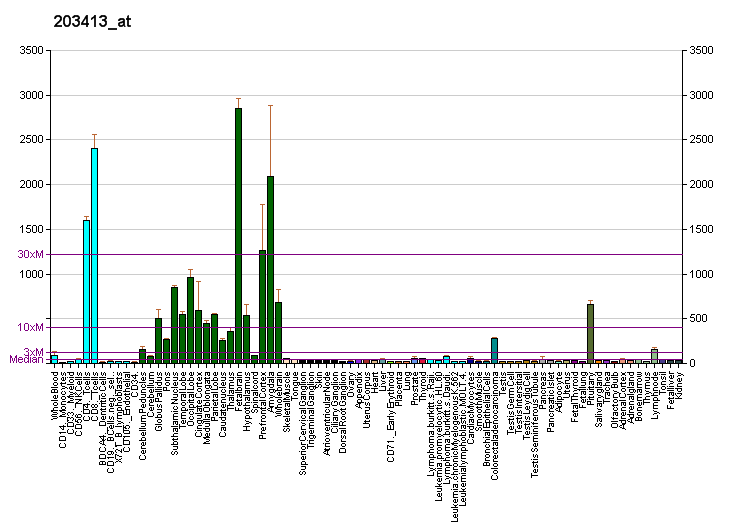

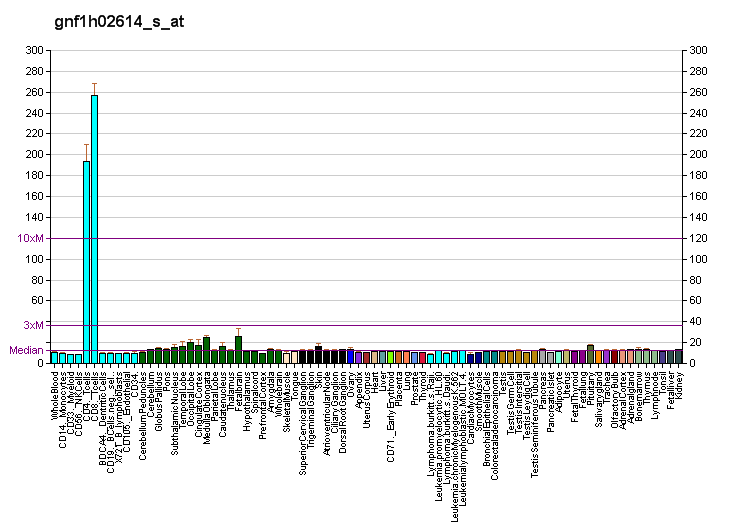
RNA expression pattern
Bgee	Human / Mouse (ortholog); Top expressed in: middle temporal gyrus; Brodmann area 23; retinal pigment epithelium; orbitofrontal cortex; frontal pole; superior frontal gyrus; endothelial cell; Brodmann area 10; germinal epithelium; postcentral gyrus / Top expressed in: dentate gyrus of hippocampal formation granule cell; primary visual cortex; superior frontal gyrus; medial dorsal nucleus; CA3 field; perirhinal cortex; piriform cortex; entorhinal cortex; Region I of hippocampus proper; medial geniculate nucleus; More reference expression data
BioGPS	More reference expression data
Gene ontology
Molecular function	calcium ion binding; protein binding; protein kinase C binding; heparin binding
Cellular component	extracellular region; cytoplasm
Biological process	neuron cellular homeostasis
Sources:Amigo / QuickGO
Orthologs
Databases	NCBI: entry; OMA: entry
Species	Human	Mouse
Entrez	4753	54003
Ensembl	ENSG00000184613	ENSMUSG00000022454
UniProt	Q99435	Q61220
RefSeq (mRNA)	NM_001145107; NM_001145108; NM_001145109; NM_001145110; NM_006159	NM_001289653; NM_016743; NM_001356950; NM_001356951
RefSeq (protein)	NP_001138579; NP_001138580; NP_001138581; NP_001138582; NP_006150	NP_001276582; NP_001343879; NP_001343880
Location (UCSC)	Chr 12: 44.51 – 44.92 Mb	Chr 15: 94.97 – 95.43 Mb
PubMed search
- Wikidata
View/Edit Human	View/Edit Mouse

Protein kinase C-binding protein NELL2 is a secreted glycoprotein that in humans is encoded by the NELL2 gene. It is a homolog of Nel, which is a gene present in the neural tissues of chickens.

This gene encodes a cytoplasmic protein that contains six epidermal growth factor (EGF) -like repeats. The encoded heterotrimeric protein may be involved in cell growth regulation and differentiation. A similar protein in rodents is involved in craniosynostosis. An alternative splice variant has been described but its full length sequence has not been determined.

== Function ==
NELL2 has been implicated to be involved in a variety of different functions including neuronal development, sperm maturation, cancer progression and bone development.

NELL2 has been shown to have roles in neuronal polarization and axon growth. NELL2 is a negative regulator of axon guidance in the SLIT-ROBO signalling pathway where it binds with the ROBO3/Rig-1 receptor. It can also bind with ROBO2 under acidic conditions, where ROBO2 undergoes proteolytic cleavage.

NELL2 expression has been linked to higher survival rates for female lung adenocarcinoma patients.
