= Laminin subunit alpha-1 =

Protein-coding gene in the species Homo sapiens

LAMA1

Identifiers
- Aliases: LAMA1, LAMA, S-LAM-alpha, PTBHS, Laminin, alpha 1, laminin subunit alpha 1
- External IDs: OMIM: 150320; MGI: 99892; GeneCards: LAMA1
Available structures
PDB	Ortholog search: PDBe RCSB
PDB	List of PDB id codes 2JD4

Gene location (Human)
Chr.	Chromosome 18 (human)
Band	18p11.31	Start	6,941,742 bp
Band	18p11.31	End	7,117,797 bp

Gene location (Mouse)
Chr.	Chromosome 17 (mouse)
Band	17 E1.1|17 38.8 cM	Start	68,004,254 bp
Band	17 E1.1|17 38.8 cM	End	68,129,642 bp
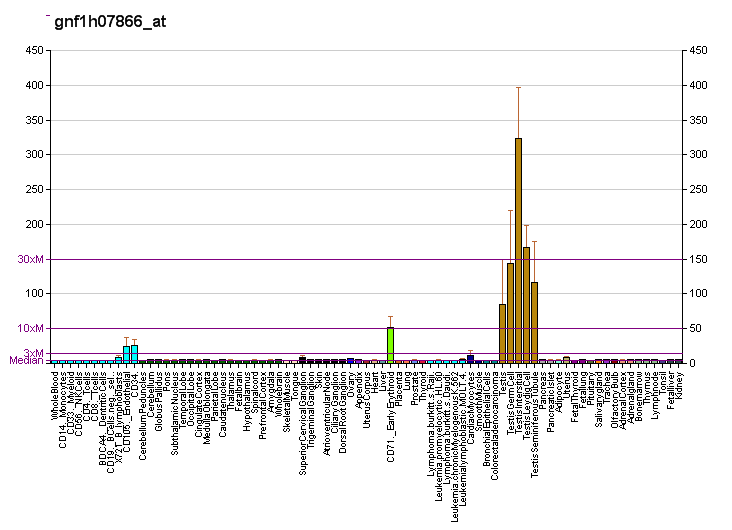

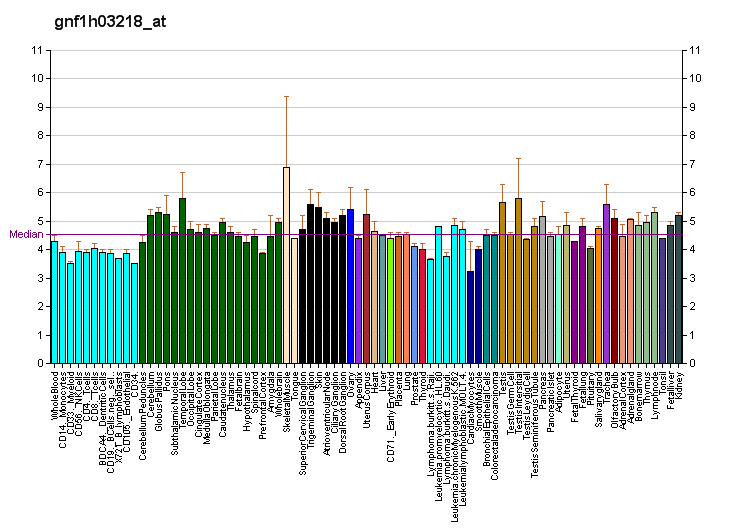
RNA expression pattern
Bgee	Human / Mouse (ortholog); Top expressed in: ventricular zone; right testis; left testis; mucosa of ileum; gonad; stromal cell of endometrium; testicle; ganglionic eminence; mucosa of colon; mucosa of sigmoid colon / Top expressed in: Bowman's capsule; tail of embryo; ovary; epithelium of lens; cumulus cell; inner renal medulla; Gonadal ridge; efferent ductule; yolk sac; cortical collecting duct; More reference expression data
BioGPS	More reference expression data
Gene ontology
Molecular function	signaling receptor binding; extracellular matrix structural constituent; protein binding; protein C-terminus binding; glycosphingolipid binding
Cellular component	extracellular matrix; extracellular region; basement membrane; laminin-1 complex; laminin-3 complex; extracellular space; membrane; cell-cell junction; laminin complex; collagen-containing extracellular matrix
Biological process	cell surface receptor signaling pathway; regulation of cell adhesion; cell adhesion; extracellular matrix organization; regulation of cell migration; regulation of embryonic development; morphogenesis of an epithelial sheet; protein phosphorylation; tissue development; neuron projection development; establishment of epithelial cell apical/basal polarity; retina development in camera-type eye; epithelial tube branching involved in lung morphogenesis; branching involved in salivary gland morphogenesis; retinal blood vessel morphogenesis; axon guidance; animal organ morphogenesis; camera-type eye development; blood vessel morphogenesis
Sources:Amigo / QuickGO
Orthologs
Databases	NCBI: entry; OMA: entry
Species	Human	Mouse
Entrez	284217	16772
Ensembl	ENSG00000101680	ENSMUSG00000032796
UniProt	P25391	P19137
RefSeq (mRNA)	NM_005559	NM_008480
RefSeq (protein)	NP_005550	NP_032506
Location (UCSC)	Chr 18: 6.94 – 7.12 Mb	Chr 17: 68 – 68.13 Mb
PubMed search
- Wikidata
View/Edit Human	View/Edit Mouse

Laminin subunit alpha-1 is a protein that in humans is encoded by the LAMA1 gene.

== Interactions ==
Laminin, alpha 1 has been shown to interact with FBLN2.

== Role in pathology ==
Mutations of the LAMA1 gene cause the Poretti–Boltshauser syndrome.
