= Laminin subunit gamma-2 =

Protein found in humans

LAMC2

Identifiers
- Aliases: LAMC2, B2T, BM600, CSF, EBR2, EBR2A, LAMB2T, LAMNB2, Laminin, gamma 2, laminin subunit gamma 2, JEB3A, JEB3B
- External IDs: OMIM: 150292; MGI: 99913; GeneCards: LAMC2

Gene location (Human)
Chr.	Chromosome 1 (human)
Band	1q25.3	Start	183,186,238 bp
Band	1q25.3	End	183,245,127 bp

Gene location (Mouse)
Chr.	Chromosome 1 (mouse)
Band	1 G3|1 65.26 cM	Start	152,998,502 bp
Band	1 G3|1 65.26 cM	End	153,062,193 bp
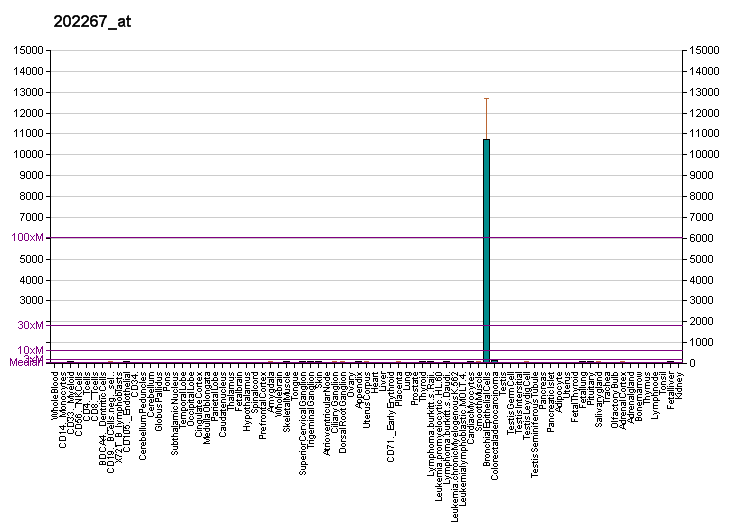
RNA expression pattern
Bgee	Human / Mouse (ortholog); Top expressed in: islet of Langerhans; hair follicle; periodontal fiber; right uterine tube; lactiferous duct; cartilage tissue; epithelium of bronchus; pancreatic ductal cell; olfactory zone of nasal mucosa; bronchial epithelial cell / Top expressed in: molar; lactiferous gland; genital tubercle; corneal stroma; tail of embryo; lung; lip; urinary bladder; Ileal epithelium; stomach; More reference expression data
BioGPS	More reference expression data
Gene ontology
Molecular function	heparin binding; extracellular matrix structural constituent
Cellular component	laminin-2 complex; perinuclear region of cytoplasm; basement membrane; cell cortex; membrane; extracellular region; extracellular space; extracellular matrix; collagen-containing extracellular matrix
Biological process	hemidesmosome assembly; cell adhesion; extracellular matrix organization; epidermis development; positive regulation of cell migration; positive regulation of cell population proliferation; organism system development; basement membrane assembly; animal organ morphogenesis; tissue development; cell migration; substrate adhesion-dependent cell spreading
Sources:Amigo / QuickGO
Orthologs
Databases	NCBI: entry; OMA: entry
Species	Human	Mouse
Entrez	3918	16782
Ensembl	ENSG00000058085	ENSMUSG00000026479
UniProt	Q13753	Q61092
RefSeq (mRNA)	NM_018891; NM_005562	NM_008485
RefSeq (protein)	NP_005553; NP_061486	n/a
Location (UCSC)	Chr 1: 183.19 – 183.25 Mb	Chr 1: 153 – 153.06 Mb
PubMed search
- Wikidata
View/Edit Human	View/Edit Mouse

Laminin subunit gamma-2 is a protein that in humans is encoded by the LAMC2 gene.

Laminins, a family of extracellular matrix glycoproteins, are the major noncollagenous constituent of basement membranes. They have been implicated in a wide variety of biological processes including cell adhesion, differentiation, migration, signaling, neurite outgrowth and metastasis. Laminins are composed of 3 non identical chains: laminin alpha, beta and gamma (formerly A, B1, and B2, respectively) and they form a cruciform structure consisting of 3 short arms, each formed by a different chain, and a long arm composed of all 3 chains. Each laminin chain is a multidomain protein encoded by a distinct gene.

Several isoforms of each chain have been described. Different alpha, beta and gamma chain isomers combine to give rise to different heterotrimeric laminin isoforms which are designated by Arabic numerals in the order of their discovery, i.e. alpha1beta1gamma1 heterotrimer is laminin 1. The biological functions of the different chains and trimer molecules are largely unknown, but some of the chains have been shown to differ with respect to their tissue distribution, presumably reflecting diverse functions in vivo. This gene encodes the gamma chain isoform laminin, gamma 2. The gamma 2 chain, formerly thought to be a truncated version of beta chain (B2t), is highly homologous to the gamma 1 chain; however, it lacks domain VI, and domains V, IV and III are shorter. It is expressed in several fetal tissues but differently from gamma 1, and is specifically localized to epithelial cells in skin, lung and kidney. The gamma 2 chain together with alpha 3 and beta 3 chains constitute laminin 5 (earlier known as kalinin), which is an integral part of the anchoring filaments that connect epithelial cells to the underlying basement membrane. The epithelium-specific expression of the gamma 2 chain implied its role as an epithelium attachment molecule, and mutations in this gene have been associated with junctional epidermolysis bullosa, a skin disease.
