= Link domain =

Protein domain

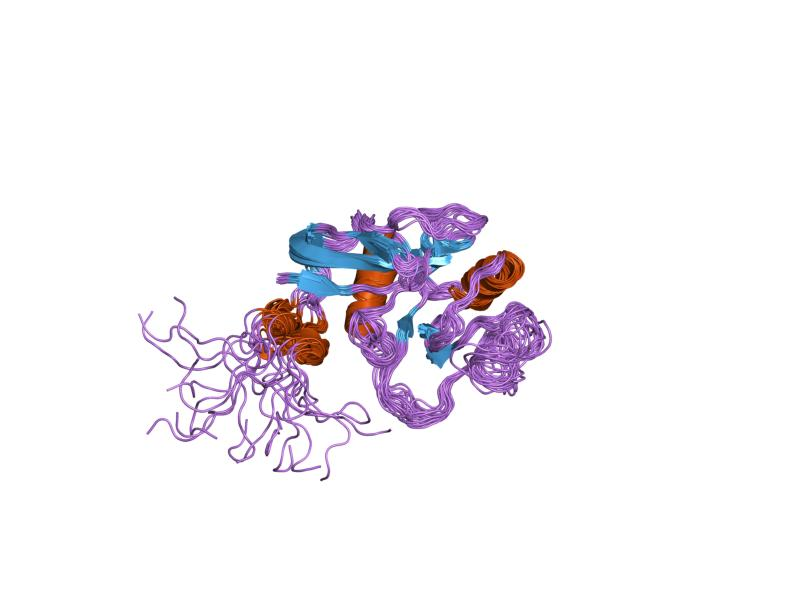
- Structure of the hyaluronan-binding domain of human CD44

Identifiers
- Symbol: LINK
- Pfam: PF00193
- Pfam clan: CL0056
- InterPro: IPR000538
- SMART: SM00445
- PROSITE: PDOC00955
- SCOP2: 1o7b / SCOPe / SUPFAM
- CDD: cd01102
Available protein structures:
- PDB: IPR000538 PF00193 (ECOD; PDBsum)
- AlphaFold: IPR000538; PF00193

A Link domain or Link module, also known as Xlink domain (X for extracellular), is a protein domain that binds to hyaluronic acid. It is important in blood cell migration and apoptosis. The link domain is found in some extracellular proteins in vertebrates such as the hyalectans. It appears to be involved in extracellular matrix assembly and stability, cell adhesion, and migration.

== Structure ==
The structure has been shown to consist of two alpha helices and two antiparallel beta sheets arranged around a large hydrophobic core similar to that of C-type lectin. This domain contains four conserved cysteines involved in two disulphide bonds. The link domain has also been termed HABM (hyaluronic acid binding module) and PTR (proteoglycan tandem repeat).

== Link domain proteins ==
Proteins which contain the link domain include:

- the hyalectans (a family of proteoglycans): aggrecan, brevican, neurocan and versican, which are expressed in the CNS;
- the cartilage link protein (LP), a proteoglycan that together with HA and aggrecan forms multimolecular aggregates;
- Tumour necrosis factor-inducible protein 6 (TSG-6), which may be involved in cell-cell and cell-matrix interactions during inflammation and tumourigenesis;
- CD44 antigen, the main cell surface receptor for HA.

== See also ==
- Hyaladherin
