= ADAMTS4 =

Protein-coding gene in humans

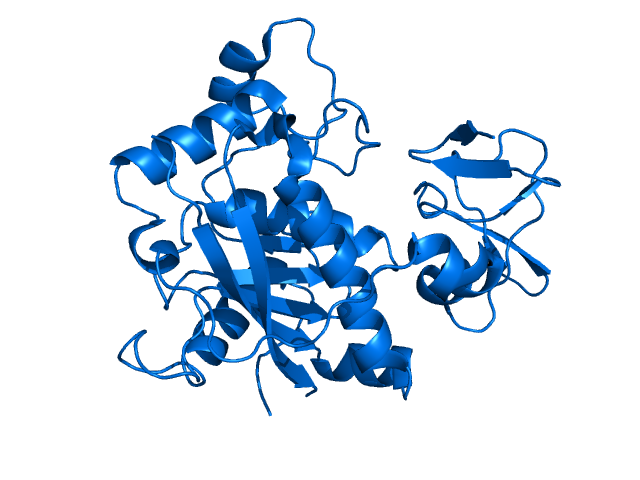

Identifiers
- Aliases: ADAMTS4, ADAMTS-2, ADAMTS-4, ADMP-1, ADAM metallopeptidase with thrombospondin type 1 motif 4
- External IDs: OMIM: 603876; MGI: 1339949; GeneCards: ADAMTS4
Available structures
PDB	Ortholog search: PDBe RCSB
PDB	List of PDB id codes 2RJP, 3B2Z, 4WK7, 4WKE, 4WKI
Enzyme activity
EC #	BRENDA	ExPASy	KEGG	MetaCyc
3.4.24.82	↗	↗	↗	↗

Gene location (Human)
Chr.	Chromosome 1 (human)
Band	1q23.3	Start	161,184,302 bp
Band	1q23.3	End	161,199,054 bp

Gene location (Mouse)
Chr.	Chromosome 1 (mouse)
Band	1 H3|1 79.28 cM	Start	171,077,990 bp
Band	1 H3|1 79.28 cM	End	171,088,206 bp
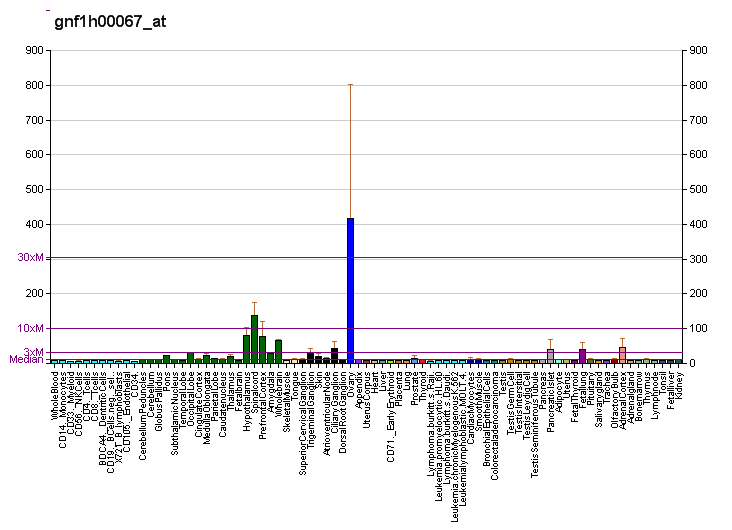
RNA expression pattern
Bgee	Human / Mouse (ortholog); Top expressed in: left uterine tube; gallbladder; gastric mucosa; left ovary; stromal cell of endometrium; right ovary; C1 segment; right auricle of heart; smooth muscle tissue; tibial nerve / Top expressed in: lumbar subsegment of spinal cord; deep cerebellar nuclei; epithelium of lens; calvaria; secondary oocyte; lateral geniculate nucleus; Region I of hippocampus proper; pontine nuclei; globus pallidus; decidua; More reference expression data
BioGPS	More reference expression data
Gene ontology
Molecular function	protease binding; peptidase activity; zinc ion binding; protein binding; hydrolase activity; metallopeptidase activity; metal ion binding; metalloendopeptidase activity
Cellular component	extracellular region; extracellular space; nuclear speck; extracellular matrix; collagen-containing extracellular matrix
Biological process	skeletal system development; extracellular matrix disassembly; proteolysis
Sources:Amigo / QuickGO
Orthologs
Databases	NCBI: entry; OMA: entry
Species	Human	Mouse
Entrez	9507	240913
Ensembl	ENSG00000158859	ENSMUSG00000006403
UniProt	O75173	Q8BNJ2
RefSeq (mRNA)	NM_005099; NM_001320336	NM_172845
RefSeq (protein)	NP_001307265; NP_005090	NP_766433
Location (UCSC)	Chr 1: 161.18 – 161.2 Mb	Chr 1: 171.08 – 171.09 Mb
PubMed search
- Wikidata
View/Edit Human	View/Edit Mouse

A disintegrin and metalloproteinase with thrombospondin motifs 4 is an enzyme that in humans is encoded by the ADAMTS4 gene.

This gene encodes a member of the ADAMTS (a disintegrin and metalloproteinase with thrombospondin motifs) protein family. Members of the family share several distinct protein modules, including a propeptide region, a metalloproteinase domain, a disintegrin-like domain, and a thrombospondin type 1 (TS) motif. Individual members of this family differ in the number of C-terminal TS motifs, and some have unique C-terminal domains. The enzyme encoded by this gene lacks a C-terminal TS motif. It can degrade aggrecan, a major proteoglycan of cartilage, brevican, a brain-specific extracellular matrix protein, neurocan and versican. The cleavage of aggrecan and brevican suggests key roles of this enzyme in arthritic disease and in the central nervous system, potentially, in the progression of glioma.

== Structure ==
ADAMTS4 is the shortest known ADAMTS, lacking the C-terminal domain and is the only non-glycosylated ADAMTS. It also only has one thrombospondin type 1 motif (TSR), whereas all the other ADAMTS have two or more TSRs. The TSR is important for binding of the enzyme to the extracellular matrix and hence its substrate specificity. Adjacent to the C-terminal TSR is a disintegrin-like domain, a cysteine-rich region that stacks against the active-site of the enzyme when in its final folded tertiary structure.

== Function ==
ADAMTS4 is capable of cleaving all the large chondroitin sulfate hyaluronan-binding proteoglycans (CSPGs), including aggrecan, brevican, neurocan and versican. Like ADAMTS5, it can be effectively inhibited by tissue inhibitor of metalloproteinase-3 (TIMP3) and this inhibition can be enhanced in the presence of aggrecan. In addition to TIMP3, it can also be inhibited by calcium pentosan polysulfate.

ADAMTS4 is expressed in ovary, spinal cord, adrenal cortex, ciliary ganglion, trigeminal ganglion, brain, retina, pancreas (islets), fetal lung, breast myoepithelial cells, tendon and cartilage.

== Clinical significance ==
ADAMTS4 (and ADAMTS5) are the major proteinases responsible for the degradation of proteoglycans in articular cartilage in osteoarthritis. Which of these aggrecanases is more important in cartilage degradation appears to be species-specific, with ADAMTS4 more important in human disease (but ADAMTS5 more important in mouse models of osteoarthritis).

== Alternative names ==
- Aggrecanase-1 (initial name reflecting its ability to cleave aggrecan)
