= Chondroitin sulfate ABC lyase =

Chondroitin sulfate ABC lyase may refer to:

- Chondroitin ABC lyase, an enzyme
- Chondroitin-sulfate-ABC exolyase, an enzyme
- Chondroitin-sulfate-ABC endolyase, an enzyme
