= Schlemm's canal =

Lymphatic-like vessel in the eye

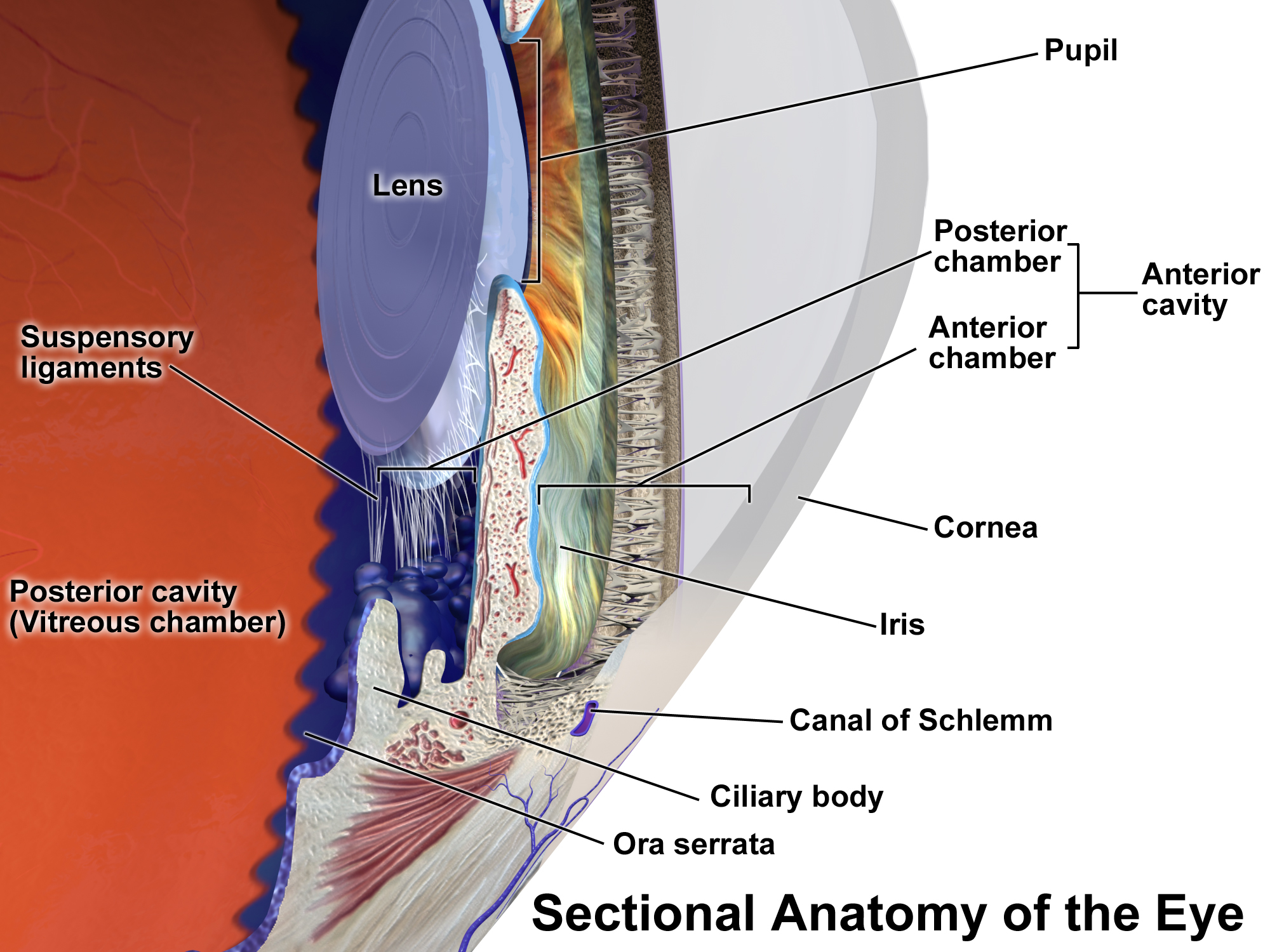
- Anterior part of the human eye, with Canal of Schlemm at lower right.

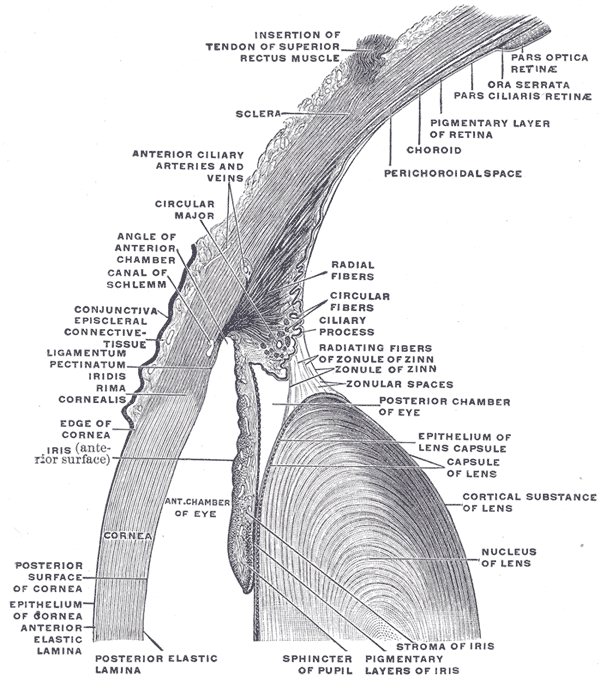
- The upper half of a sagittal section through the front of the eyeball. (Canal of Schlemm labeled at center left.)

Details
- System: Eye

Identifiers
- Latin: sinus venosus sclerae
- MeSH: D000092662
- TA98: A12.3.06.109
- FMA: 51873

Schlemm's canal, also known as the canal of Schlemm, and as the scleral venous sinus, is a circular lymphatic-like vessel in the eye. It collects aqueous humor from the anterior chamber and delivers it into the episcleral blood vessels. Canaloplasty may be used to widen it.

== Structure ==
Schlemm's canal is an endothelium-lined tube, resembling that of a lymphatic vessel. On the inside of the canal, nearest to the aqueous humor, it is covered and held open by the trabecular meshwork. This creates outflow resistance against the aqueous humor.

=== Development ===
While Schlemm's canal has generally been considered as a vein or a scleral venous sinus, the canal is similar to the lymphatic vasculature. It is never filled with blood in physiological settings as it does not receive arterial blood circulation. Schlemm's canal displays several features of lymphatic endothelium, including the expression of PROX1, VEGFR3, CCL21, FOXC2, but lacked the expression of LYVE1 and PDPN. It develops via a unique mechanism involving the transdifferentiation of venous endothelial cells in the eye into lymphatic-like endothelial cells.

This developmental morphogenesis of the canal is sensitive to the inhibition of lymphangiogenic growth factors. In adults, the administration of the lymphangiogenic growth factor VEGFC enlarged the Schlemm's canal, which was associated with a reduction in intraocular pressure.

In the combined absence of angiopoietin 1 and angiopoietin 2, Schlemm's canal and episcleral lymphatic vasculature completely failed to develop.

== Function ==
Schlemm's canal collects aqueous humor from the anterior chamber. It delivers it into the episcleral blood vessels via aqueous veins.

== Clinical significance ==
=== Canaloplasty ===
Canaloplasty is a procedure to restore the eye's natural drainage system to provide sustained reduction of intraocular pressure. Microcatheters are used in a simple and minimally invasive procedure. A surgeon creates a tiny incision to gain access to Schlemm's canal. A microcatheter circumnavigates Schlemm's canal around the iris, enlarging the main drainage channel and its smaller collector channels through the injection of a sterile, viscoelastic material. The catheter is then removed and a suture is placed within the canal and tightened. By opening Schlemm's canal, the pressure inside the eye is relieved.

=== Laser trabeculoplasty ===
A trabeculoplasty is a modification of the trabecular meshwork. Laser trabeculoplasty (LTP) is the application of a laser beam to burn areas of the trabecular meshwork, located near the base of the iris, to increase fluid outflow. LTP is used in the treatment of various open-angle glaucomas.

The two types of laser trabeculoplasty are Argon Laser Trabeculoplasty (ALT) and Selective Laser Trabeculoplasty (SLT).

As its name suggests, Argon laser trabeculoplasty uses an Argon laser to create tiny burns on the trabecular meshwork.

Selective laser trabeculoplasty is newer technology that uses a laser to target specific cells within the trabecular meshwork and create less thermal damage than ALT. SLT shows promise as a long-term treatment.

In SLT, a laser is used to selectively target the melanocytes in the trabecular meshwork. Though the mechanism by which SLT functions is not well understood, it has been shown in trials to be as effective as the older Argon Laser Trabeculoplasty. However, because SLT is performed using a much lower power laser, it does not appear to affect the structure of the trabecular meshwork (based on electron microscopy) to the same extent, so retreatment may be possible if the effects from the original treatment should begin wear off, although this has not been proven in clinical studies. ALT is repeatable to some extent with measurable results possible.

If SLT is successful, it will stimulate metabolic change in pigmented cells in the trabecular meshwork. This causes an immune response which, in turn, clears the meshwork channel/drain of cellular build up. This allows more aqueous humour to flow into Schlemm's canal from the anterior cavity, reducing the intraocular pressure and therefore lowering the risk of glaucoma, or further damage to the optic nerve, due to overpressure in the eye.

=== Angiopoietin deficiency ===
Schlemm's canal and episcleral lymphatic vasculature completely failed to develop in the combined absence of angiopoietin 1 and angiopoietin 2. This causes buphthalmos and glaucoma.

=== Glaucoma ===
Glaucoma may be related to drainage of aqueous humor from the eye. This is mostly related to resistance on the internal surface of Schlemm's canal.

== History ==
Schlemm's canal is named after Friedrich Schlemm (1795–1858), a German anatomist.

== Additional images ==
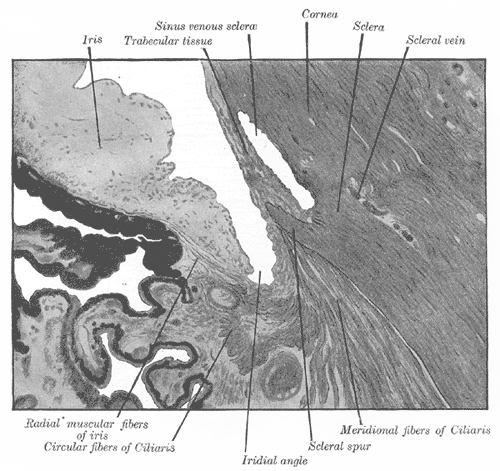
Enlarged general view of the iridial angle. (Labeled with older label of 'sinus venosus scleræ' at center top.)

== See also ==
- Intraocular pressure
- Ocular hypertension
