= HAPLN2 =

Protein found in humans

Identifiers
- Aliases: HAPLN2, BRAL1, hyaluronan and proteoglycan link protein 2
- External IDs: MGI: 2137300; GeneCards: HAPLN2

Gene location (Human)
| Chr. | Chromosome 1 (human) |
| Band | 1q23.1 | Start | 156,619,331 bp |
| Band | 1q23.1 | End | 156,625,725 bp |

Gene location (Mouse)
| Chr. | Chromosome 3 (mouse) |
| Band | 3 F1|3 38.78 cM | Start | 87,929,057 bp |
| Band | 3 F1|3 38.78 cM | End | 87,934,890 bp |
RNA expression pattern
| Bgee | Human / Mouse (ortholog); Top expressed in: C1 segment; putamen; right hemisphere of cerebellum; amygdala; right frontal lobe; inferior ganglion of vagus nerve; caudate nucleus; substantia nigra; nucleus accumbens; inferior olivary nucleus / Top expressed in: lumbar subsegment of spinal cord; primary visual cortex; motor neuron; superior frontal gyrus; anterior horn of spinal cord; cerebellar cortex; substantia nigra; deep cerebellar nuclei; brain stem; embryo; More reference expression data |
| BioGPS | n/a |
Gene ontology
| Molecular function | hyaluronic acid binding; extracellular matrix structural constituent |
| Cellular component | extracellular region; extracellular matrix |
| Biological process | establishment of blood-nerve barrier; central nervous system development; extracellular matrix assembly; skeletal system development; cell adhesion |
Sources:Amigo / QuickGO
Orthologs
| Databases | NCBI: entry; OMA: entry |
| Species | Human | Mouse |
| Entrez | 60484 | 73940 |
| Ensembl | ENSG00000132702 | ENSMUSG00000004894 |
| UniProt | Q9GZV7 | Q9ESM3 |
| RefSeq (mRNA) | NM_021817 | NM_022031 |
| RefSeq (protein) | NP_068589 | NP_071314 |
| Location (UCSC) | Chr 1: 156.62 – 156.63 Mb | Chr 3: 87.93 – 87.93 Mb |
| PubMed search |
- Wikidata
| View/Edit Human | View/Edit Mouse |

Hyaluronan and proteoglycan link protein 2 (HAPLN2) also known as brain link protein 1 (BRAL1) is a protein that in humans is encoded by the HAPLN2 gene. HAPLN1 codes for a related link protein that is expressed in cartilage while Bral1 is expressed in brain.

== Function ==
Bral1 interacts with versican and brevican in nodes of Ranvier. In mice with reduced Bralp1 expression the extracellular matrix at nodes of Ranvier is disrupted and action potential conduction is abnormal.
