= Lectican =

Lecticans, also known as hyalectans, are a family of large chondroitin sulfate proteoglycans found in the extracellular matrix. There are four members of the lectican family: aggrecan, brevican, neurocan, and versican. Lecticans interact with hyaluronic acid and tenascin-R to form a ternary complex.

== Tissue distribution ==
Aggrecan and versican are widely distributed throughout all tissues. Where aggrecan is a major extracellular matrix constituent in cartilage, versican is widely expressed in a number of connective tissues, including those in vascular smooth muscle, skin, and the cells of central and peripheral nervous systems. Brevican and neurocan are primarily restricted to the central nervous system (CNS) and are particularly abundant in perineuronal nets.

== Structure ==
All four lecticans contain an N-terminal globular domain (G1 domain) that in turn contains an immunoglobulin V-set domain and a Link domain that binds hyaluronic acid; a long extended central domain (CS) that is modified with covalently attached sulfated glycosaminoglycan chains, and a C-terminal globular domain (G3 domain) containing one or more EGF repeats, a C-type lectin domain and a CRP-like domain. Aggrecan has in addition a globular domain (G2 domain) that is situated between the G1 and CS domains.

== See also ==
- Hyaladherin
