= Nadine Gogolla =

German neuroscientist

- Education: B.S. Marburg University, Germany, M.S. Inserm U546 Paris, France, PhD Friedrich Miescher Institute of Biomedical Research and University of Basel, Postdoctoral work at Harvard University
- Known for: Facial expression reflect emotional states in mice
- Awards: Charles A. King Trust - Post-doctoral Research Fellowship Award, Human Frontiers Science Program (HFSP) Long-Term Fellowship, Jane Coffin Childs Memorial Fund for Medical Research, Ed Fisher Prize, Best Ph.D. Thesis Award, German National Academic Merit Foundation
- Scientific career
- Fields: Neuroscience
- Workplaces: Max Planck Institute of Psychiatry

Nadine Gogolla is Director at the Max Planck Institute of Psychiatry in Munich, Germany, leading the Department of Emotion Research. Previously (2014-2021) she has been Group Leader at the Max Planck Institute of Neurobiology, now Max Planck Institute for Biological Intelligence. She is also an Associate Faculty of the Graduate School for Systemic Neuroscience. Gogolla investigates the neural circuits underlying emotion to understand how the brain integrates external cues, feeling states, and emotions to make calculated behavioral decisions. Gogolla is known for her discovery using machine learning and two-photon microscopy to classify mouse facial expressions into emotion-like categories and correlate these facial expressions with neural activity in the insular cortex.

== Early life and education ==
Gogolla conducted her undergraduate studies in human biology at Marburg University in Germany. Right after finishing her undergraduate degree in 2002, Gogolla completed her M.S. at Inserm U546 in Paris, France under the mentorship of Roland Liblau studying neuroimmune interactions in disease models. Later in 2002, Gogolla began her graduate studies in neurobiology at Friedrich Miescher Institute of Biomedical Research affiliated with the University of Basel in Basel, Switzerland. Under the mentorship of Pico Caroni, Gogolla explored the regulatory mechanisms governing structural plasticity in the brain.

During her PhD, Gogolla published several first author papers in the journal Nature Protocols. In early 2006, Gogolla published her first paper in Nature Protocols outlining an innovative method to prepare organotypic hippocampal slice cultures for long-term live imaging up to 6 months in vitro. Shortly after, Gogolla published another Nature Protocols paper outlining a novel method for long-term imaging of neural circuits in organotypic hippocampal slice cultures. Gogolla's third first author Nature Protocols paper was published in 2006 as well outlining a staining protocol for organotypic hippocampal slice cultures. Using these methods, Gogolla was able to graduate summa cum laude the following year in 2007. Gogolla's dissertation was titled "Experience-dependent structural rearrangements of synaptic connectivity in the adult central nervous system". Her dissertation work highlighted the molecular mechanisms underlying experience dependent plasticity in the mossy fiber pathway of the hippocampus and she explored how age and lifestyle effect these mechanisms in vitro. Before finishing her PhD, Gogolla co-first authored a paper in Neuron describing axonal plasticity mechanisms and the role of axonal plasticity in persistently modifying local circuit structure throughout the lifespan.

After completing her PhD in 2007, Gogolla began her postdoctoral training at Harvard University under the mentorship of Takao Hensch. While at Harvard, Gogolla explored the neurobiological mechanisms underlying critical periods of brain development. During this time, Gogolla published two papers that she had been working on during graduate school. The first paper, published in Neuron in 2009, showed that the effects of environmental enrichment on synapse number and hippocampal network structure are mediated by wnt signalling in the CA3 region of the hippocampus. The then published a first author paper in Science, along with her graduate team from Friedrich Miescher Institute, showing that a part of the extracellular matrix, a biological material known as chondroitin sulfate proteglycans, builds up in the amygdala forming perineuronal nets which protect fear memories from erasure. Intriguingly, degrading these perineuronal nets in adulthood using an enzyme that degrades chondroitin sulfate proteoglycans, rendered fear memories susceptible to extinction again. This finding could inspire translational research towards treatments for disorders such as post-traumatic stress disorder, characterized by an inability to eliminate fear-inducing memories leading to behavioral disruptions. In 2009, Gogolla published a first author paper in the Journal of Neurodevelopmental Disorders. Her study explored the idea that the complexity of Autism Spectrum Disorders (ASD) is a result of aberrant excitatory/inhibitory neural circuit regulation during critical periods in development. Gogolla narrowed in on Parvalbumin (PV) positive inhibitory interneurons since they mediate experience-dependent neural circuit refinement in development, and she explored the expression of these neurons across multiple ASD mouse models. Gogolla strikingly found a PV positive neuron deficit in the neocortex across multiple ASD mouse models highlighting a critical role for these neurons in normal development and the potential of this circuit defect as a target for ASD prevention. Gogolla then began to explore the insular cortex (IC), a brain region that is a part of the cerebral cortex, that seems to play a role in many complex brain processes including multisensory integration, representation of emotions, motor control, and complex social processes such as empathy. Integration of sensory, emotional, and cognitive information allows for these diverse functions of the IC, so Gogolla sought to understand how this integration occurs and how it is aberrantly functioning in ASD models, both idiopathic and monogenic. Through in vivo fluorescence imaging techniques, Gogolla was able to record from the IC and observe multisensory integration emerging in the IC throughout early development, but this process did not occur in ASD models. She further found that expression of inhibitory neuron markers was decreased compared to controls in the IC of ASD mouse models suggesting that inhibitory/excitatory circuit balance is disrupted. Following this result, they pharmacologically enhanced inhibitory signalling in juvenile mice via systemic injections of diazepam for two weeks and found that it rescued integration deficits in ASD models. Intriguingly, enhancing inhibitory transmission pharmacologically in adult mice had no effect on neural circuit balance nor multisensory integration. Their finding suggests that enhancing inhibitory transmission during a critical developmental period can restore inhibitory/excitatory balance and restore normal multisensory integration functions of the IC. Gogolla's research, published in Neuron in 2014, received a large amount of attention due to the new insights in provided in how ASD might manifest in the human brain and lead to ASD type behaviors.

== Career and Research ==
After finishing her postdoctoral work at Harvard, Gogolla moved back to Germany in 2014 where she started a faculty position at the Max Planck Institute of Neurobiology in Martinsried, Germany. Gogolla is also an Associate Faculty in the Graduate School of Systemic Neurosciences at the Munich Center for Neurosciences at LMU Munich. Gogolla currently leads a group of scientists at MPI where her research program focuses on exploring the neural circuits of the insular cortex as well as their connections to the prefrontal cortex and other limbic structures as a means to understand how it plays a part in so many diverse brain processes. A better understanding of the neural circuit mechanisms mediating diverse functions of the insular cortex, such as emotional regulation, empathy, and social behavior, will give insight into how processes are altered in disease states such as schizophrenia, ASD, addiction, and mood disorders. To probe insular neural circuits, Gogolla and her lab use in vivo two-photon calcium imaging to record neural activity while mice are processing emotionally relevant stimuli, and they further use innovative behavioral assays, optogenetic techniques, and machine learning algorithms to link neural activity to behavior, manipulate neural circuits, and decode the activity of behaviorally and emotionally relevant IC neural ensembles.

In 2017, Gogolla wrote a review on the IC describing its anatomical location and connectivity, its role as an integration hub, its role in sensory processing, homeostatic regulation, emotional regulation, and valence processing as well as its role in driving behavior. Gogolla also explored the human IC and how it is affected in different neurological and psychiatric disorders to emphasize the importance of gaining a better understanding of this region, an integral goal of her research program.

In 2019, Gogolla described role of the posterior insular cortex (pIC) to central amygdala projection in the mediating anxiety-related behaviors as well as the posterior insular cortex to nucleus accumbens projection in the inhibition of feeding behaviors. Using optogenetics, they found that stimulating the pIC caused aversive behaviors as well as increased autonomic responses. Then, using in vivo two-photon calcium imaging, Gogolla and her team were able to record calcium transients in neurons in the pIC as an indicator of neural activity to establish a causal relationship between pIC activity and the convergence and integration of acute sensory stimuli as well as sustained affective and homeostatic states.

In 2020, Gogolla and her team published a groundbreaking paper using innovative machine learning and two-photon technologies to show that mouse facial expressions correlate with internal emotional states and that neural activity in the IC is closely correlated with specific facial expressions in mice. Gogolla was inspired by a 2014 Cell paper stating that emotions represent brain states and should last for a discrete amount of time after the stimulus that evoked them and, importantly, they should scale to the strength of the stimulus that evoked them. As such, Gogolla presented salient stimuli to headfixed mice, such as sweet and bitter tastes or slightly painful shocks, meant to trigger specific emotional responses. While they presented these stimuli, they recorded the faces of the mice and then broke down the video recordings into facial-muscle movements that they then used to train a machine learning algorithm to detect distinct facial-muscle movements that correlate with emotions. For example, they found that when a mouse experiences pain, its nose dropped and its ears tilted downward. Not only was the algorithm able to detect distinct facial expressions that correlated to the distinct emotion-evoking stimuli, but the facial expressions were also graded based on the intensity of the stimulus presented. This unbiased and quantitative approach to recognizing facial expressions, and thus emotional state readouts, will finally allow neuroscientists to ask and answer questions about how the brain processes emotion and drives motivated behaviors. The second part of the study focused on the neural basis of these facial expressions, or emotional states. Gogolla's team recorded neurons in the IC using two-photon imaging such that they could observe neurons with single-cell resolution to observe neurons that only fire when particular facial expressions are performed. Further, they used optogenetics to drive specific neural circuits known to be involved in specific emotional states and trigger the corresponding facial expressions in mice. This study emphasizes the power of applying machine learning techniques to neuroscience questions since the faces of animals may have appeared to be emotionless to human observers but machine learning algorithms were able to detect the subtle changes that indicate distinct emotional states. These findings have dramatically improved our ability to dissect how and where emotions arise in the brain, now that we can detect and quantify them in animal models, which opens up the potential to translate these findings to the human brain to understand brain disorders characterized by aberrations in emotional processing and emotional regulation such as mood disorders.

== Awards and honors ==
- 2017: ERC Starting Grant "Insular Anxiety"
- 2011 – 2013: Charles A. King Trust, Post-doctoral Research Fellowship Award
- 2008 – 2011: Human Frontiers Science Program (HFSP) Long-Term Fellowship
- 2008 – 2011: Jane Coffin Childs Memorial Fund for Medical Research – Long-Term Fellowship (declined in favor of HFSP Award)
- 2008: Ed Fisher Prize, Best Ph.D. Thesis Award, Friedrich Miescher Institute, Basel
- 1997 - 2002: German National Academic Merit Foundation (Studienstiftung des Deutschen Volkes), full scholarship

== Selected publications ==
- Dolensek, Nejc; Gehrlach, Daniel A.; Klein, Alexandra S.; Gogolla, Nadine (2020). "Facial expressions of emotion states and their neuronal correlates in mice". Science. 368 (6486): 89–94. Bibcode:2020Sci...368...89D. doi:10.1126/science.aaz9468. hdl:21.11116/0000-0006-430F-F. PMID 32241948. S2CID 214763289.
- Gehrlach, D.A.; Dolensek, N.; Klein, A.S.; Roy Chowdhury, R.; Matthys, A.; Junghänel, M.; Gaitanos, T.N.; Podgornik, A.; Black, T.D.; Reddy Vaka, N.; Conzelmann, K.-K.; Gogolla, N. (2019-08-27). "Aversive state processing in the posterior insular cortex". Nature Neuroscience. 22 (9): 1424–1437. doi:10.1038/s41593-019-0469-1. PMID 31455886. S2CID 201652422.
- Gogolla, Nadine (2017-06-19). "The insular cortex". Current Biology. 27 (12): R580–R586. doi:10.1016/j.cub.2017.05.010. ISSN 0960-9822. PMID 28633023.
- Gogolla, N.; Takesian, A.E.; Feng, G.; Fagiolini, M.; Hensch, T.K. (2014-08-20). "Sensory Integration in Mouse Insular Cortex Reflects GABA Circuit Maturation". Neuron. 83 (4): 894–905. doi:10.1016/j.neuron.2014.06.033. PMC 4177076. PMID 25088363.
- Gogolla, N.; Caroni, P.; Luthi, A.; Herry, C. (2009-09-04). "Perineuronal nets protect fear memories from erasure". Science. 325 (5945): 1258–1261. Bibcode:2009Sci...325.1258G. doi:10.1126/science.1174146. PMID 19729657. S2CID 206520056.
- Gogolla, N.; LeBlanc, J.J.; Quast, K.B.; Südhof, T.C.; Fagiolini, M.; Hensch, T.K. (2009-06-04). "Perineuronal nets protect fear memories from erasure". Journal of Neurodevelopmental Disorders. 1 (2): 172–181. Bibcode:2009Sci...325.1258G. doi:10.1007/s11689-009-9023-x. PMC 2906812. PMID 20664807.
- Gogolla, N.; Galimberti, I.; Deguchi, Y.; Caroni, P. (2009). "WNT signaling mediates experience-related regulation of synapse numbers and mossy fiber connectivities in the adult hippocampus". Neuron. 62 (4): 510–525. doi:10.1016/j.neuron.2009.04.022. PMID 19477153. S2CID 17085834.
- Galimberti, Ivan; Gogolla, Nadine; Alberi, Stefano; Santos, Alexandre Ferrao; Muller, Dominique; Caroni, Pico (2006). "Long-Term Rearrangements of Hippocampal Mossy Fiber Terminal Connectivity in the Adult Regulated by Experience". Neuron. 50 (5): 749–763. doi:10.1016/j.neuron.2006.04.026. PMID 16731513. S2CID 17286013.
- Gogolla, Nadine; Galimberti, Ivan; Depaola, Vincenzo; Caroni, Pico (2006). "Preparation of organotypic hippocampal slice cultures for long-term live imaging". Nature Protocols. 1 (3): 1165–1171. doi:10.1038/nprot.2006.168. PMID 17406399. S2CID 12105896.
- Gogolla, Nadine; Galimberti, Ivan; Depaola, Vincenzo; Caroni, Pico (2006). "Long-term live imaging of neuronal circuits in organotypic hippocampal slice cultures". Nature Protocols. 1 (3): 1223–1226. doi:10.1038/nprot.2006.169. PMID 17406405. S2CID 2081598.
- Gogolla, Nadine; Galimberti, Ivan; Depaola, Vincenzo; Caroni, Pico (2006). "Staining protocol for organotypic hippocampal slice cultures". Nature Protocols. 1 (5): 2452–2456. doi:10.1038/nprot.2006.180. PMID 17406491. S2CID 22384802.
