= Aggrecanase =

Group of enzymes

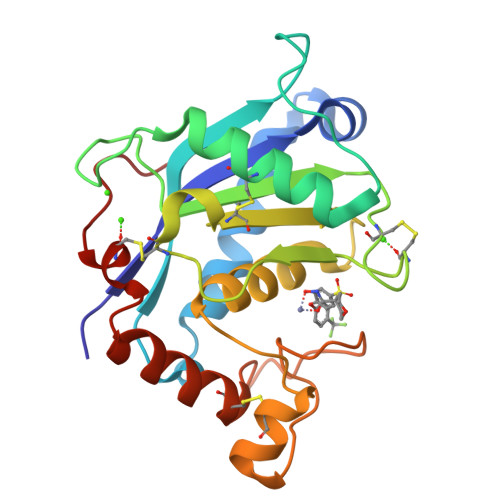
Crystal Structure of the Catalytic Domain of ADAMTS-5 (Aggrecanase-2)

Aggrecanases are extracellular proteolytic enzymes that are members of the ADAMTS (A Disintegrin And Metalloprotease with Thrombospondin Motifs) family. Aggrecanases act on large proteoglycans known as aggrecans, which are components of connective tissues such as cartilage. The inappropriate activity of aggrecanase is a mechanism by which cartilage degradation occurs in diseases such as arthritis. At least two forms of aggrecanase exist in humans: ADAMTS4 or aggrecanase-1 and ADAMTS5 or aggrecanase-2. Both proteins contain thrombospondin (TS) motifs required for proper recognition of substrates. Although both proteins can cleave the substrate aggrecan at the same position, they differ in kinetics and in secondary cleavage sites.

== Structure ==
Aggrecanase is a very large molecule. Its size is estimated to be around 2.5 million Daltons. The molecule is built from a core protein that weighs about 250 kilodaltons. The molecule is made of multiple subunits, each with a specific function. It has a signal sequence of about 170 amino acids in length. The purpose of this sequence is to direct the protein to the correct location of the cell. Another subunit is the pre domain, the metalloproteinase domain, which is around 230 amino acids in length. Its purpose is to keep the enzyme inactive until necessary. Another way the enzyme will remain inactive is in the absence of its catalytic region, which is dependent on zinc ion. Its purpose is to help bind the molecule and stabilize interactions.

Attached to the core protein are glycosaminoglycans, a long chain of negatively charged polysaccharides. These glycosaminoglycans consist of chondroitin sulfate and keratan sulfate.

The glycosaminoglycans being negatively charged, allow the aggrecan to hold large amounts of water. This is beneficial to the molecule because aggrecanase is a part of connective tissue, cartilage. The water allows the cartilage to better resist pressure when the joints it protects are compressed. This is because the water does not allow it to collapse, but instead spring back and maintain its structure.

== History and discovery ==
The discovery for aggrecanases initially came from the study of cartilage and the way it degraded depending on it conditions. Scientists were attempting to find the difference in cartilage from its normal state to its diseased state. The initial analysis determined the matrix metalloproteinases could cleave the cartilage at a specific site. The site as within the interlobular domain it was in between the G1 and G2 regions. Upon further experimentation in 1991, the cartilage was treated with interleukin-1, an inflammatory mediator. This went against the initial findings because the split happened in a new location. This new discovery allowed scientist to understand there was another enzyme that was responsible, aggrecanase. Through further experimentation aggrecanse was continually detected particularly in relation to inflammatory arthritis and osteoarthritis. The first successfully identified enzyme was ADAMTS4, an aggrecanase. As time went on the enzyme was determined to be a part of a zinc dependent family, the ADAMTS family. More enzymes were discovered, ADAMTS5 and ADAMRS1. All of the enzymes in the ADAMTS family were exhibiting similar activity. They were all functioning within the cartilage as mediators.

== Activation ==
Aggrecan degrading enzymes such as ADAMTS4 and ADAMTS5 are initially produced in an inactive state to avoid unwanted cartilage breakdown. This is the bodys way of protecting itself from over degradation as cartilage does provide use to cushion the joints. In order to activate the enzymes, separate enzymes called proprotein converses or serine proteinases will remove a small blocking segment from the aggrecanase protein called aggrecanase propeptides. The proprotein convertases will break the peptide bond at the amino acid pattern R/K–Xn–R/K–Y. Where the R/K are indicating either arginine or lysine, X is indicating any amino acid could be present, and n is indicating the varying amount of amino acids that are possible for the in between :zero, two, four, or six. The activation can occur at different locations based on where the enzymes are in and around the cell. These enzymes can be found inside the cell, on the cell surface, and outside the cell in the surrounding tissue. This allows enzymes such as furin to activate aggrecans in locations such as the trans Golgi network or the extracellular matrix.

== Inhibition ==
Although cartilage breakdown is important for the metabolic process and removing dead cells, unregulated degradation can cause illness. The regulatory mechanisms in place are inhibitory proteins known as tissue inhibitors of metalloproteinases. A large contributor to the inhibition is TIMP3 halting enzymes ADAMTS4 and ADAMTS5. In order for TIMP3 to conduct its functions it binds to negatively charged components of the extracellular matrix allowing it to remain localized where aggrecan degradation occurs. The inhibition has been shown to be more of a reactionary response instead of a precautionary action. It increases its expression when conditions such as osteoarthritis is present.

Along with the natural inhibition of TIMP3 scientist are conducting research to create synthetic inhibitors. This is a work in progress as the main issue is the inhibitors are not specific enough and are blocking other enzymes.
