= TSG-6 =

Protein-coding gene in the species Homo sapiens

TNFAIP6
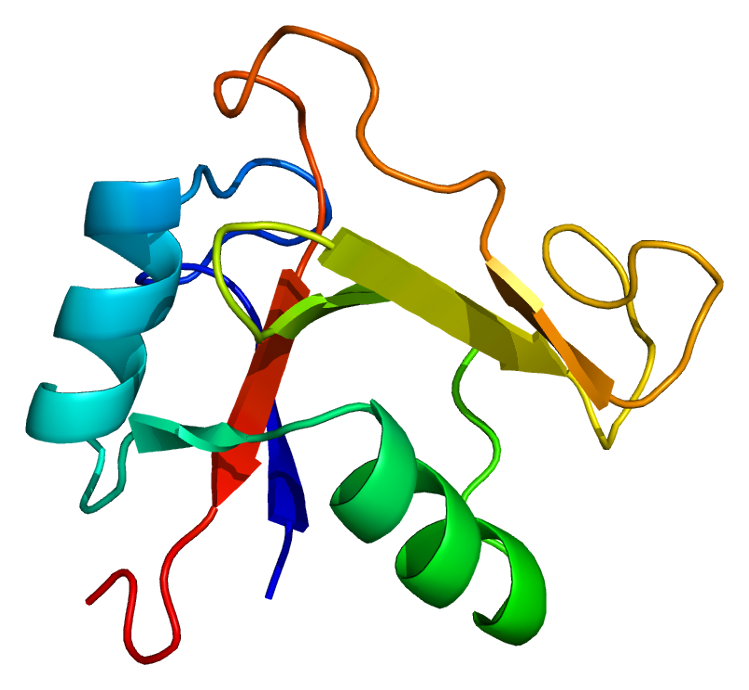

Identifiers
- Aliases: TNFAIP6, TSG-6, TSG6, TNF alpha induced protein 6
- External IDs: OMIM: 600410; MGI: 1195266; GeneCards: TNFAIP6
Available structures
PDB	Ortholog search: PDBe RCSB
PDB	List of PDB id codes 1O7B, 1O7C, 2PF5, 2WNO, 2N40

Gene location (Human)
Chr.	Chromosome 2 (human)
Band	2q23.3	Start	151,357,592 bp
Band	2q23.3	End	151,380,046 bp

Gene location (Mouse)
Chr.	Chromosome 2 (mouse)
Band	2|2 C1.1	Start	51,928,021 bp
Band	2|2 C1.1	End	51,946,698 bp
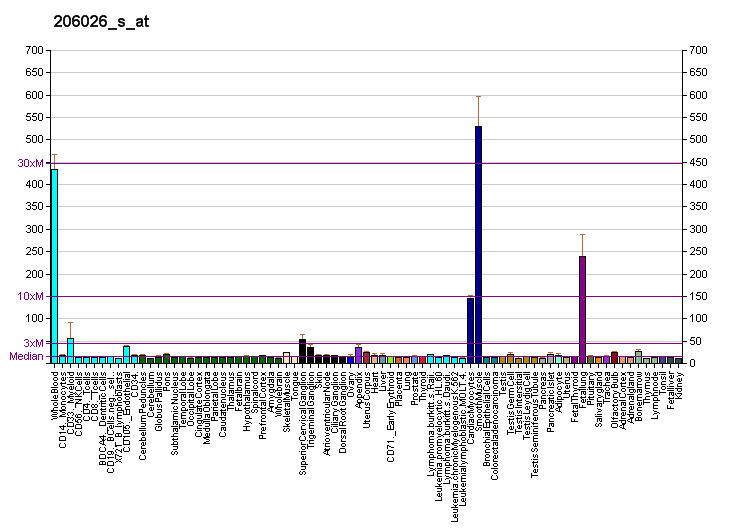

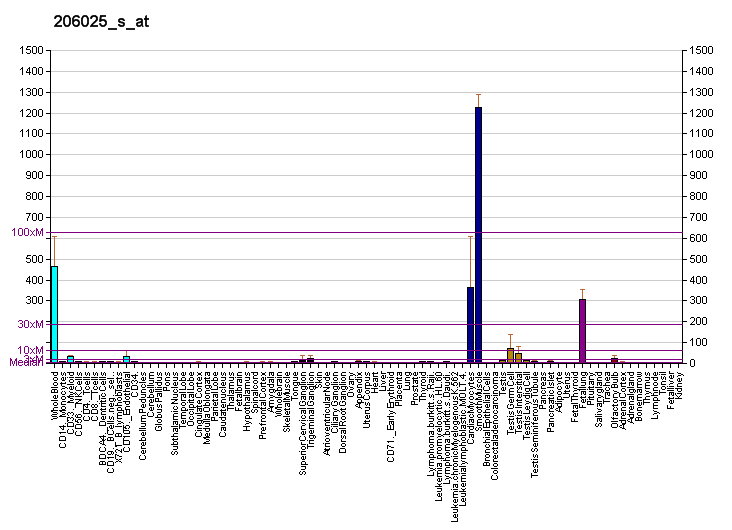
RNA expression pattern
Bgee	Human / Mouse (ortholog); Top expressed in: cartilage tissue; testicle; vena cava; buccal mucosa cell; sperm; periodontal fiber; synovial membrane; synovial joint; Achilles tendon; blood / Top expressed in: dermis; lumbar subsegment of spinal cord; medial ganglionic eminence; deep cerebellar nuclei; intercostal muscle; granulocyte; skin of abdomen; cumulus cell; pineal gland; skin of external ear; More reference expression data
BioGPS	More reference expression data
Gene ontology
Molecular function	hyaluronic acid binding; protein binding
Cellular component	extracellular region; extracellular space; tertiary granule lumen; ficolin-1-rich granule lumen
Biological process	cell-cell signaling; cell adhesion; inflammatory response; negative regulation of inflammatory response; signal transduction; positive regulation of cell migration; ovulation; neutrophil degranulation
Sources:Amigo / QuickGO
Orthologs
Databases	NCBI: entry; OMA: entry
Species	Human	Mouse
Entrez	7130	21930
Ensembl	ENSG00000123610	ENSMUSG00000053475
UniProt	P98066	O08859
RefSeq (mRNA)	NM_007115	NM_009398
RefSeq (protein)	NP_009046	NP_033424
Location (UCSC)	Chr 2: 151.36 – 151.38 Mb	Chr 2: 51.93 – 51.95 Mb
PubMed search
- Wikidata
View/Edit Human	View/Edit Mouse

Tumor necrosis factor-inducible gene 6 protein also known as TNF-stimulated gene 6 protein or TSG-6 is a protein that in humans is encoded by the TNFAIP6 (tumor necrosis factor, alpha-induced protein 6) gene.

== Structure and function ==
TSG-6 is a 30 kDa secreted protein that contains a hyaluronan-binding LINK domain a and thus is a member of the hyaluronan-binding protein family, also called hyaladherins. The hyaluronan-binding domain is known to be involved in extracellular matrix stability and cell migration. This protein has been shown to form a stable, covalent complex with inter-alpha-inhibitor (IαI), and thus enhance the serine protease inhibitory activity of IαI, which is important in the protease network associated with inflammation. The expression of this gene can be induced by a number of signalling molecules, principally tumor necrosis factor α (TNF-α) and interleukin-1 (IL-1). The expression can also be induced by mechanical stimuli in vascular smooth muscle cells, and is found to be correlated with proteoglycan synthesis and aggregation. TSG-6 has been shown to modulate macrophage plasticity and signal the transition of LPS-treated macrophages from pro- to anti-inflammatory phenotype.

TSG-6 also interacts with a number of matrix associated molecules such as aggrecan, versican, thrombospondin (1&2), pentraxin-3 and fibronectin.
