= Acquired progressive lymphangioma =

- Other names: Benign lymphangioendothelioma
- Specialty: Oncology

Acquired progressive lymphangioma, also known as benign lymphangioendothelioma, is a group of lymphangiomas that occur anywhere in young individuals, grow slowly, and present as bruise-like lesions or erythematous macules. Acquired progressive lymphangioma may develop following radiation therapy, surgery, trauma, inflammation, and tick bites. The treatment of choice is complete surgical excision.

== Signs and symptoms ==
Acquired progressive lymphangioma appears as a slowly growing erythaematous to brownish, bruise-like, macule, plaque, or nodule typically located on the legs, head or neck. The lesions are usually asymptomatic.

== Causes ==
Acquired progressive lymphangioma has been known to develop after radiation therapy, surgery, trauma, femoral arteriography, inflammation, and tick bites.

== Mechanism ==
Because acquired progressive lymphangioma has been described following various traumas, it is thought to be a response to various inflammatory stimuli rather than a real neoplasm.

Another possible pathogenic explanation is hormonal stimulation, as quickly growing lesions have been observed in numerous pubescent and prepubescent individuals.

Finally, another idea proposed is that acquired progressive lymphangioma represents a complicated vascular hamartoma with three components: lymphatic vessels, blood vessels, and smooth muscle.

== Diagnosis ==
Acquired progressive lymphangioma has thin-walled endothelial-lined gaps interspersed between collagen strands. Endothelial cells show positive staining for lymphatic markers as podoplanin (D2-40), LYVE-1, and PROX-1. Additionally, the cells have variable levels of factor VIII, Ulex europaeus agglutinin I, CD31, and CD34.

== Treatment ==
Acquired progressive lymphangioma is treated by complete surgical excision.

== See also ==
- List of cutaneous conditions
