= Chondroitinase treatment =

- Specialty: Neurology

Chondroitinase treatment is a treatment of proteoglycans, a protein in the fluid among cells where they affect neural communication, plasticity, and other things. Chondroitinase treatment has been shown to allow adults' vision to be restored as far as ocular dominance is concerned. Moreover, there is some evidence that chondroitinase could treat spinal injuries.

The enzyme chondroitinase ABC is used in this treatment and derives from the bacterium Proteus vulgaris. In 2018, pre-clinical research involving the chondroitinase ABC enzyme has been mainly directed towards treating spinal cord injuries in test animals using viral vectors. In general, chondroitinase ABC works in vivo by cleaving off the side chains of chondroitin sulfate proteoglycans (CSPGs), which are over-produced by glial cells in the central nervous system when a spinal injury occurs. Chondroitin sulfate proteoglycans bonded to their side chains called chondroitin sulfate glycosaminoglycans prevent neuroregeneration in the central nervous system by forming glial scar tissue, which inhibits both neuroplasticity and repair of damaged axons. However, when the side chains of the chondroitin sulfate proteoglycans are cleaved by chondroitinase ABC, this promotes the damaged region of the CNS to recover from the spinal cord injury.

A 2020 study proposed that chondroitinase treatment promotes plasticity by activating tropomyosin receptor kinase B—receptor for brain-derived neurotrophic factor and a major plasticity orchestrator in the brain. Cleavage of CSPGs by chondroitinase ABC leads to inactivation of PTPRS, the membrane receptor for CSPGs and a phosphatase that inactivates TRKB under normal physiological conditions, which subsequently promotes TRKB phosphorylation and activation of neuroplasticity.

== See also ==
- Interstitial fluid
- Chondroitin sulfate
