= Multifocal lymphangioendotheliomatosis =

- Other names: Congenital cutaneovisceral angiomatosis with thrombocytopenia, multifocal lymphangioendotheliomatosis with thrombocytopenia
- Specialty: Dermatology

Multifocal lymphangioendotheliomatosis, also known as congenital cutaneovisceral angiomatosis with thrombocytopenia and multifocal lymphangioendotheliomatosis with thrombocytopenia (MLT), is a skin condition that presents at birth with hundreds of red-brown plaques as large as several centimeters.

== Signs and symptoms ==
This disease presents as diffuse reddish-brown, congenital cutaneous papules and plaques. Important additional findings include vascular lesions in the GI tract and possibly other organ systems. Severe gastrointestinal bleeding resulting from these lesions is likely and requires repeated blood transfusions. Serious cases of associated thrombocytopenia are frequently caused by localized intralesional platelet consumption.

Patients with multifocal lymphangioendotheliomatosis typically have GI and cutaneous involvement, although there have also been reports of cases with no GI involvement as well as mild or delayed cutaneous involvement. Furthermore, reports of instances with normal platelet counts have been made.

== Diagnosis ==
Given the phenotypic variability, there are no established diagnostic criteria. Instead, the diagnosis is made based on clinical evidence and supporting histopathology that demonstrates the presence of positive lymphatic markers, such as podoplanin (D2-40) or lymphatic vessel endothelial hyaluronan receptor 1 (LYVE-1), as well as negative glucose transporter 1 (GLUT-1).

== Treatment ==
For multifocal lymphangioendotheliomatosis, there is no accepted course of care. Most cases of anemia and severe thrombocytopenia require numerous transfusions. In terms of medical therapy, corticosteroids, thalidomide, vincristine, propranolol, octreotide, aminocaproic acid, bevacizumab, and/or sirolimus are available.

== See also ==
- Skin lesion
- List of cutaneous conditions
