= CSPG5 =

Protein-coding gene in humans

Identifiers
- Aliases: CSPG5, NGC, chondroitin sulfate proteoglycan 5
- External IDs: OMIM: 606775; MGI: 1352747; GeneCards: CSPG5

Gene location (Human)
Chr.	Chromosome 3 (human)
Band	3p21.31	Start	47,562,238 bp
Band	3p21.31	End	47,580,792 bp

Gene location (Mouse)
Chr.	Chromosome 9 (mouse)
Band	9|9 F2	Start	110,072,851 bp
Band	9|9 F2	End	110,091,644 bp
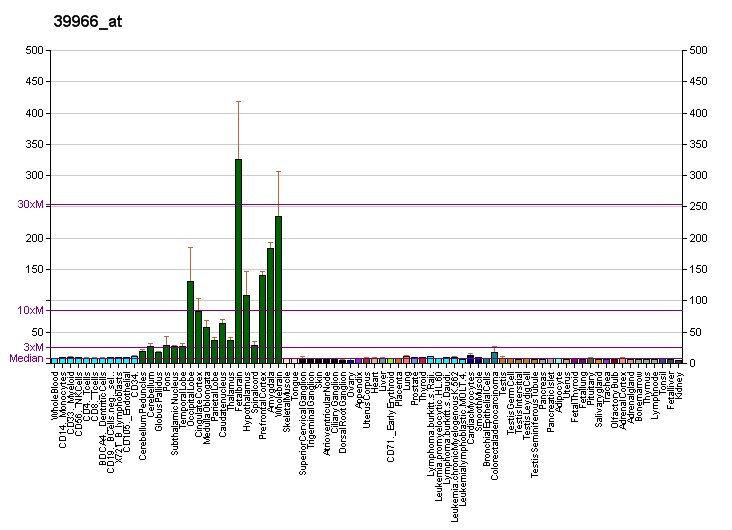

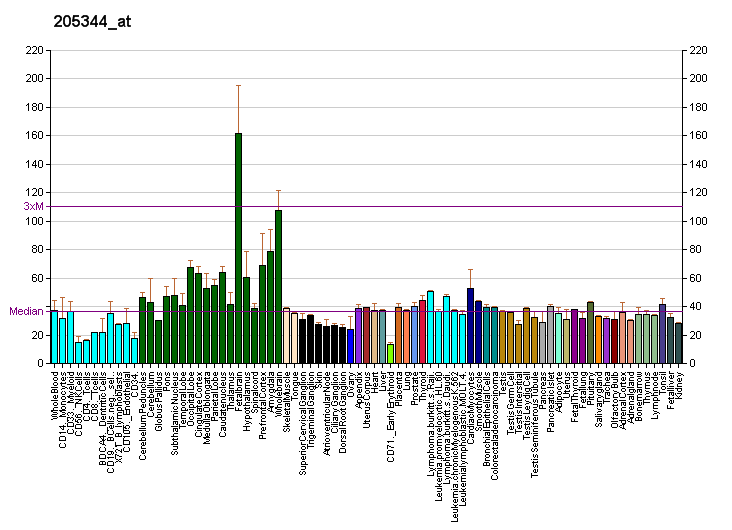
RNA expression pattern
Bgee	Human / Mouse (ortholog); Top expressed in: endothelial cell; retinal pigment epithelium; frontal pole; Brodmann area 23; Epithelium of choroid plexus; Brodmann area 10; Region I of hippocampus proper; orbitofrontal cortex; entorhinal cortex; Brodmann area 46 / Top expressed in: visual cortex; primary visual cortex; dentate gyrus of hippocampal formation granule cell; superior frontal gyrus; cingulate gyrus; prefrontal cortex; nucleus of stria terminalis; primary motor cortex; anterior amygdaloid area; piriform cortex; More reference expression data
BioGPS	More reference expression data
Gene ontology
Molecular function	protein binding; growth factor activity
Cellular component	integral component of membrane; Golgi apparatus; endoplasmic reticulum membrane; membrane; Golgi membrane; plasma membrane; integral component of plasma membrane; extracellular region; cell surface; lysosomal lumen; endoplasmic reticulum; Golgi lumen; Golgi-associated vesicle membrane; glutamatergic synapse; GABA-ergic synapse; integral component of postsynaptic membrane
Biological process	cell differentiation; chondroitin sulfate biosynthetic process; modulation of chemical synaptic transmission; intracellular transport; nervous system development; multicellular organism development; chondroitin sulfate catabolic process; regulation of growth; dermatan sulfate biosynthetic process; regulation of signaling receptor activity; trans-synaptic signaling, modulating synaptic transmission; regulation of synaptic vesicle exocytosis; cytoskeleton organization; glial cell projection elongation; positive regulation of substrate adhesion-dependent cell spreading; signal transduction
Sources:Amigo / QuickGO
Orthologs
Databases	NCBI: entry; OMA: entry
Species	Human	Mouse
Entrez	10675	29873
Ensembl	ENSG00000114646	ENSMUSG00000032482
UniProt	O95196	Q71M36
RefSeq (mRNA)	NM_006574; NM_001206942; NM_001206943; NM_001206944; NM_001206945	NM_001166273; NM_013884
RefSeq (protein)	NP_001193871; NP_001193872; NP_001193873; NP_001193874; NP_006565	NP_001159745; NP_038912
Location (UCSC)	Chr 3: 47.56 – 47.58 Mb	Chr 9: 110.07 – 110.09 Mb
PubMed search
- Wikidata
View/Edit Human	View/Edit Mouse

Chondroitin sulfate proteoglycan 5 is a protein that in humans is encoded by the CSPG5 gene.

== Interactions ==
CSPG5 has been shown to interact with GOPC.
