= GOPC =

Protein-coding gene in humans

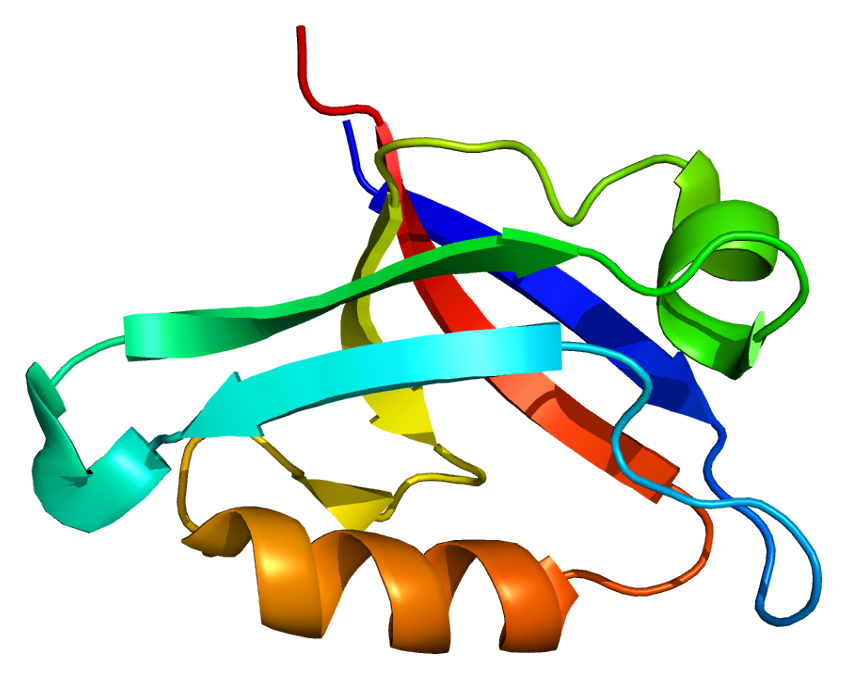

Identifiers
- Aliases: GOPC, CAL, FIG, GOPC1, PIST, dJ94G16.2, golgi-associated PDZ and coiled-coil motif containing, golgi associated PDZ and coiled-coil motif containing
- External IDs: OMIM: 606845; MGI: 2149946; GeneCards: GOPC
Available structures
PDB	Ortholog search: PDBe RCSB
PDB	List of PDB id codes 2DC2, 2LOB, 4E34, 4E35, 4JOE, 4JOF, 4JOG, 4JOH, 4JOJ, 4JOK, 4JOP, 4JOR, 4K6Y, 4K72, 4K75, 4K76, 4K78, 4NMO, 4NMP, 4NMQ, 4NMR, 4NMS, 4NMT, 4NMV, 4Q6H, 4Q6S

Gene location (Human)
Chr.	Chromosome 6 (human)
Band	6q22.1	Start	117,560,269 bp
Band	6q22.1	End	117,602,542 bp

Gene location (Mouse)
Chr.	Chromosome 10 (mouse)
Band	10|10 B3	Start	52,211,946 bp
Band	10|10 B3	End	52,258,220 bp
RNA expression pattern
Bgee	Human / Mouse (ortholog); Top expressed in: tibia; pancreatic epithelial cell; parietal pleura; visceral pleura; secondary oocyte; germinal epithelium; middle temporal gyrus; skin of arm; tendon of biceps brachii; Achilles tendon / Top expressed in: trigeminal ganglion; medullary collecting duct; dorsomedial hypothalamic nucleus; piriform cortex; lumbar spinal ganglion; dentate gyrus of hippocampal formation granule cell; ascending aorta; epithelium of lens; right kidney; atrioventricular valve; More reference expression data
BioGPS	n/a
Gene ontology
Molecular function	transmembrane transporter binding; protein binding; frizzled binding; protein C-terminus binding; GTPase regulator activity; protein homodimerization activity
Cellular component	lysosomal membrane; Golgi-associated vesicle membrane; trans-Golgi network transport vesicle; synapse; cell projection; cell junction; Golgi membrane; postsynaptic density; postsynaptic membrane; dendrite; membrane; Golgi apparatus; cytoplasm; plasma membrane; protein-containing complex
Biological process	endoplasmic reticulum to Golgi vesicle-mediated transport; protein homooligomerization; apical protein localization; protein transport; Golgi to plasma membrane transport; negative regulation of anion channel activity; cytoplasmic sequestering of CFTR protein; negative regulation of protein localization to cell surface; spermatid nucleus differentiation; regulation of catalytic activity
Sources:Amigo / QuickGO
Orthologs
Databases	NCBI: entry; OMA: entry
Species	Human	Mouse
Entrez	57120	94221
Ensembl	ENSG00000047932	ENSMUSG00000019861
UniProt	Q9HD26	Q8BH60
RefSeq (mRNA)	NM_020399; NM_001017408	NM_001199272; NM_053187
RefSeq (protein)	NP_001017408; NP_065132	NP_001186201; NP_444417
Location (UCSC)	Chr 6: 117.56 – 117.6 Mb	Chr 10: 52.21 – 52.26 Mb
PubMed search
- Wikidata
View/Edit Human	View/Edit Mouse

Golgi-associated PDZ and coiled-coil motif-containing protein is a protein that in humans is encoded by the GOPC gene.

PIST is a PDZ domain-containing Golgi protein. PDZ domains contain approximately 90 amino acids and bind the extreme C terminus of proteins in a sequence-specific manner.[supplied by OMIM]

== Interactions ==
GOPC has been shown to interact with GRID2, BECN1, RHOQ, ACCN3, Cystic fibrosis transmembrane conductance regulator and CSPG5.
