= ADAMTS5 =

Protein-coding gene in humans

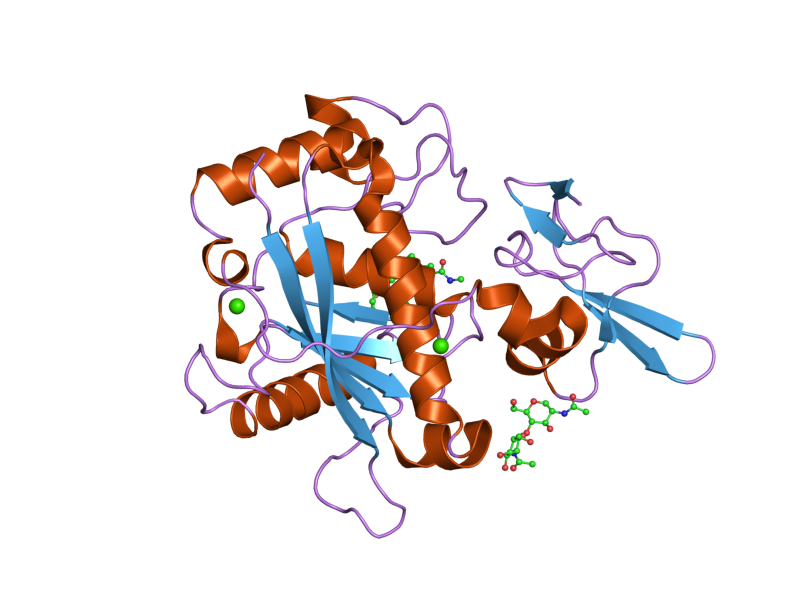

Identifiers
- Aliases: ADAMTS5, ADAM-TS 11, ADAM-TS 5, ADAM-TS5, ADAMTS-11, ADAMTS-5, ADAMTS11, ADMP-2, ADAM metallopeptidase with thrombospondin type 1 motif 5
- External IDs: OMIM: 605007; MGI: 1346321; GeneCards: ADAMTS5
Available structures
PDB	Ortholog search: PDBe RCSB
PDB	List of PDB id codes 2RJQ, 3B8Z, 3HY7, 3HY9, 3HYG, 3LJT

Gene location (Human)
Chr.	Chromosome 21 (human)
Band	21q21.3	Start	26,917,922 bp
Band	21q21.3	End	26,967,088 bp

Gene location (Mouse)
Chr.	Chromosome 16 (mouse)
Band	16 C3.3|16 48.34 cM	Start	85,653,061 bp
Band	16 C3.3|16 48.34 cM	End	85,698,716 bp
RNA expression pattern
Bgee	Human / Mouse (ortholog); Top expressed in: lactiferous duct; synovial joint; stromal cell of endometrium; skin of hip; decidua; synovial membrane; Epithelium of choroid plexus; endothelial cell; buccal mucosa cell; gastric mucosa / Top expressed in: decidua; gastrula; stroma of bone marrow; white adipose tissue; aortic valve; ascending aorta; sciatic nerve; iris; efferent ductule; trigeminal ganglion; More reference expression data
BioGPS	n/a
Gene ontology
Molecular function	heparin binding; zinc ion binding; extracellular matrix binding; metal ion binding; integrin binding; peptidase activity; protein binding; hydrolase activity; metallopeptidase activity; metalloendopeptidase activity
Cellular component	endoplasmic reticulum lumen; extracellular region; extracellular space; extracellular matrix; collagen-containing extracellular matrix
Biological process	extracellular matrix disassembly; proteolysis; defense response to bacterium; tooth eruption; negative regulation of cold-induced thermogenesis
Sources:Amigo / QuickGO
Orthologs
Databases	NCBI: entry; OMA: entry
Species	Human	Mouse
Entrez	11096	23794
Ensembl	ENSG00000154736	ENSMUSG00000022894
UniProt	Q9UNA0	Q9R001
RefSeq (mRNA)	NM_007038	NM_011782
RefSeq (protein)	NP_008969	NP_035912
Location (UCSC)	Chr 21: 26.92 – 26.97 Mb	Chr 16: 85.65 – 85.7 Mb
PubMed search
- Wikidata
View/Edit Human	View/Edit Mouse

A disintegrin and metalloproteinase with thrombospondin motifs 5 also known as ADAMTS5 is an enzyme that in humans is encoded by the ADAMTS5 gene.

== Function ==
ADAMTS5 is a member of the ADAMTS (a disintegrin and metalloproteinase with thrombospondin motifs) protein family. Members of the family share several distinct protein modules, including a propeptide region, a metalloproteinase domain, a disintegrin-like domain, and a thrombospondin type 1 (TS) motif. Individual members of this family differ in the number of C-terminal TS motifs, and some have unique C-terminal domains. The enzyme encoded by this gene contains two C-terminal TS motifs and functions as aggrecanase to cleave aggrecan, a major proteoglycan of cartilage. ADAMTS5 may also have a role in the pathogenesis of human osteoarthritis.

== Animal studies ==
Genetically modified mice in which the catalytic domain of ADAMTS5 was deleted are resistant to cartilage destruction in an experimental model of osteoarthritis. ADAMTS5 is the major aggrecanase in mouse cartilage in a mouse model of inflammatory arthritis.
