= HAPLN1 =

Protein-coding gene in the species Homo sapiens

Identifiers
- Aliases: HAPLN1, CRTL1, CRT1, hyaluronan and proteoglycan link protein 1
- External IDs: OMIM: 115435; MGI: 1337006; GeneCards: HAPLN1

Gene location (Human)
Chr.	Chromosome 5 (human)
Band	5q14.3	Start	83,637,805 bp
Band	5q14.3	End	83,720,855 bp

Gene location (Mouse)
Chr.	Chromosome 13 (mouse)
Band	13 C3|13 45.5 cM	Start	89,687,915 bp
Band	13 C3|13 45.5 cM	End	89,759,771 bp
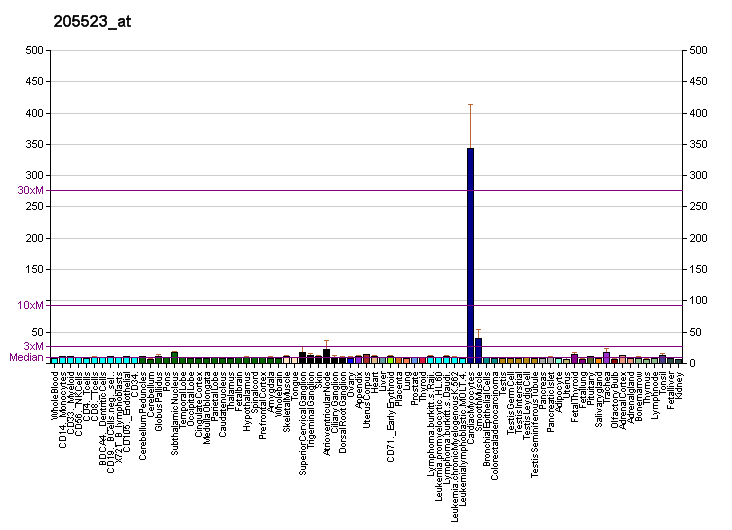

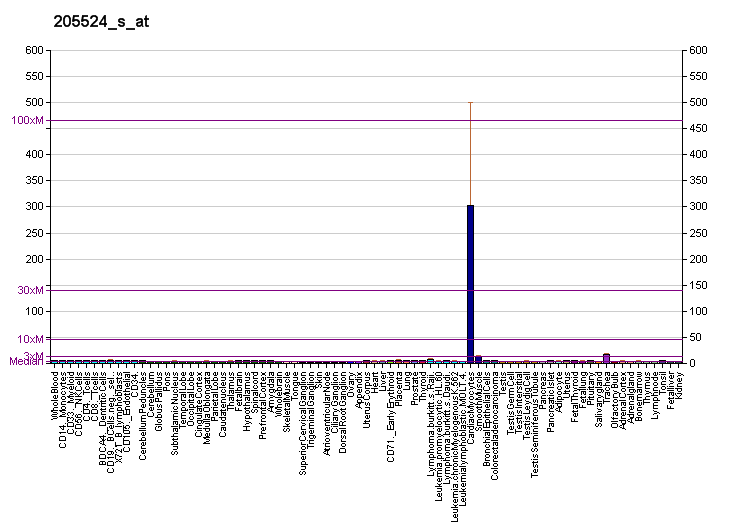
RNA expression pattern
Bgee	Human / Mouse (ortholog); Top expressed in: tibia; cartilage tissue; placenta; testicle; endothelial cell; epithelium of colon; gonad; buccal mucosa cell; mucosa of sigmoid colon; jejunal mucosa / Top expressed in: fossa; condyle; intercostal muscle; human fetus; tail of embryo; abdominal wall; endocardial cushion; genital tubercle; otic placode; semi-lunar valve; More reference expression data
BioGPS	More reference expression data
Gene ontology
Molecular function	extracellular matrix structural constituent; hyaluronic acid binding; extracellular matrix structural constituent conferring compression resistance
Cellular component	extracellular matrix; extracellular region; synapse; collagen-containing extracellular matrix
Biological process	skeletal system development; extracellular matrix organization; central nervous system development; cell adhesion
Sources:Amigo / QuickGO
Orthologs
Databases	NCBI: entry; OMA: entry
Species	Human	Mouse
Entrez	1404	12950
Ensembl	ENSG00000145681	ENSMUSG00000021613
UniProt	P10915	Q9QUP5
RefSeq (mRNA)	NM_001884	NM_013500
RefSeq (protein)	NP_001875	NP_038528
Location (UCSC)	Chr 5: 83.64 – 83.72 Mb	Chr 13: 89.69 – 89.76 Mb
PubMed search
- Wikidata
View/Edit Human	View/Edit Mouse

Hyaluronan and proteoglycan link protein 1 is a protein that in humans is encoded by the HAPLN1 gene.

== Interactions ==
HAPLN1 has been shown to interact with Versican.
