= Chondroitin-sulfate-ABC endolyase =

Enzyme

Identifiers
- EC no.: 4.2.2.20

Databases
- IntEnz: IntEnz view
- BRENDA: BRENDA entry
- ExPASy: NiceZyme view
- KEGG: KEGG entry
- MetaCyc: metabolic pathway
- PRIAM: profile
- PDB structures: RCSB PDB PDBe PDBsum
Search
- PMC: articles
- PubMed: articles
- NCBI: proteins

The enzyme chondroitin-sulfate-ABC endolyase (EC 4.2.2.20) catalyzes the following process:

Endolytic cleavage of (1→4)-β-galactosaminic bonds between N-acetylgalactosamine and either D-glucuronic acid or L-iduronic acid to produce a mixture of Δ^{4}-unsaturated oligosaccharides of different sizes that are ultimately degraded to Δ^{4}-unsaturated tetra- and disaccharides

This enzyme belongs to the family of lyases, specifically those carbon-oxygen lyases acting on polysaccharides. The systematic name of this enzyme class is chondroitin-sulfate-ABC endolyase. Other names in common use include chondroitinase (ambiguous), chondroitin ABC eliminase (ambiguous), chondroitinase ABC (ambiguous), chondroitin ABC lyase (ambiguous), chondroitin sulfate ABC lyase (ambiguous), ChS ABC lyase (ambiguous), chondroitin sulfate ABC endoeliminase, chondroitin sulfate ABC endolyase, and ChS ABC lyase I.
