= Hyaladherin =

Hyaladherins, also known as hyaluronan-binding proteins, are proteins capable of binding to hyaluronic acid. Most hyaladherins belong to the Link module superfamily, including its main receptor CD44, hyalectans and TSG-6. In addition there is a diverse group of hyaladherins lacking a Link module; these include the receptor RHAMM, C1QBP (HABP1) and HABP2. The primary roles of hyaladherins are cell adhesion, structural support of the extracellular matrix (ECM) and cell signalling.

Due to the role of aberrant hyaluronic acid synthesis and degradation in various cancers, hyaladherins, as well as hyaluronic acid, are considered a promising target for cancer therapy.

== See also ==
- Hyaluronan synthase
- Hyaluronidase
