= Lymphatic endothelium =

The lymphatic endothelium refers to a specialized subset of endothelial cells located in the sinus systems of draining lymph nodes. Specifically, these endothelial cells line the branched sinus systems formed by afferent lymphatic vessels, forming a single-cell layer which functions in a variety of critical physiological processes. These lymphatic endothelial cells contribute directly to immune function and response modulation, provide transport selectivity, and demonstrate orchestration of bidirectional signaling cascades. Additionally, lymphatic endothelial cells may be implicated in downstream immune cell development as well as lymphatic organogenesis. (Jalkanen, S., Salmi, M. 2020) Until recently, lymphatic endothelial cells have not been characterized to their optimal potential. This system is very important in the function of continuous removal of interstitial fluid and proteins, while also having a significant function of entry for leukocytes and tumor cells. This leads to further research that is being developed on the relationship between lymphatic endothelium and metastasis of tumor cells (Pepper, M. S., & Skobe, M. 27 October 2003). The lymphatic capillaries are described to be blind ended vessels (closed on one end), and they are made up of a single non-fenestrated layer of endothelial cells; The lymph capillaries function to aid in the uptake of fluids, macromolecules, and cells. Although they are generally similar to blood capillaries, the lymph capillaries have distinct structural differences. Lymph capillaries consist of a more wide and irregular lumen, and the endothelium in lymph capillaries is much thinner as well (S. Pepper, Skobe 2003). Their origin has been speculated to vary based on them being dependent on specific tissue environments, and powered by organ-specific signals.(L. Gutierrez-Miranda, K. Yaniv, 2020). A lymph capillary endothelial cell is distinct from other endothelial cells in that collagen fibers are directly attached to its plasma membrane.

Although lymphatics were first described by Hippocrates in 400 BC and rediscovered as "milky veins in the gut of a well fed dog" in the 17th century by Gasparo Aselli, they were ignored for centuries until in 1937 Howard Florey showed that lymphatics enlarge in inflammation. At this stage vascular and lymphatic endothelia were seen to be morphologically distinct and lymphatic vessels considered less important. Later it was discovered that VEGF-R3 and VEGF-C/VEGF-D were the key growth factors controlling lymphatic endothelial proliferation. Markers of lymphatic endolthelium were not discovered until relatively recently. These being LYVE-1 (Jackson et al., 1999) and podoplanin (Kerjaschki, 1999).

== See also ==
- Lymphatic system
- Immune system
