= Trabeculoplasty =

Laser treatment for open angle glaucoma or ocular hypertension

- Specialty: Ophthalmology

Trabeculoplasty is a laser treatment for glaucoma. It is done on an argon laser equipped slit lamp, using a Goldmann gonioscope lens mirror. Specifically, an argon laser is used to improve drainage through the eye's trabecular meshwork, from which the aqueous humour drains. This helps reduce intraocular pressure caused by open-angle glaucoma.

== Research ==
The LiGHT trial compared the effectiveness of eye drops and selective laser trabeculoplasty for open angle glaucoma. Both contributed to a similar quality of life but most people undergoing laser treatment were able to stop using eye drops. Laser trabeculoplasty was also shown to be more cost-effective.

== See also ==
- Eye surgery
- Laser surgery
- Trabeculectomy
