= LYVE1 =

Region of a specific protein

Identifiers
- Aliases: LYVE1, CRSBP-1, HAR, LYVE-1, XLKD1, lymphatic vessel endothelial hyaluronan receptor 1
- External IDs: OMIM: 605702; MGI: 2136348; HomoloGene: 4868; GeneCards: LYVE1; OMA:LYVE1 - orthologs

Gene location (Human)
Chr.	Chromosome 11 (human)
Band	11p15.4	Start	10,556,966 bp
Band	11p15.4	End	10,611,689 bp

Gene location (Mouse)
Chr.	Chromosome 7 (mouse)
Band	7|7 E3	Start	110,449,814 bp
Band	7|7 E3	End	110,462,446 bp
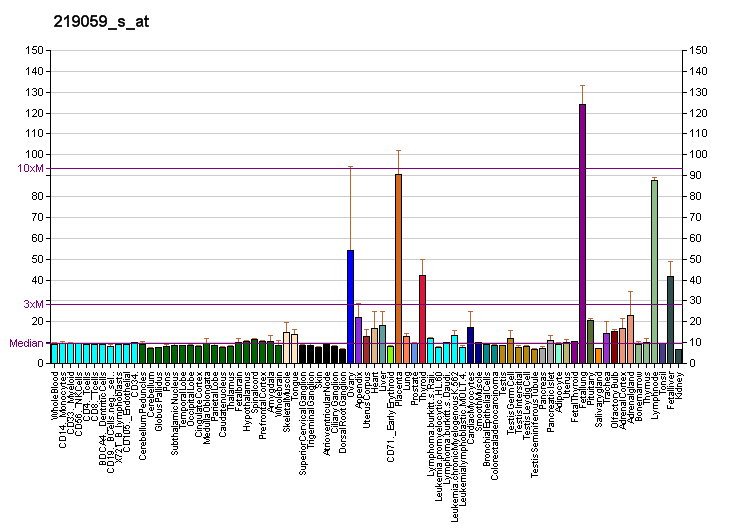

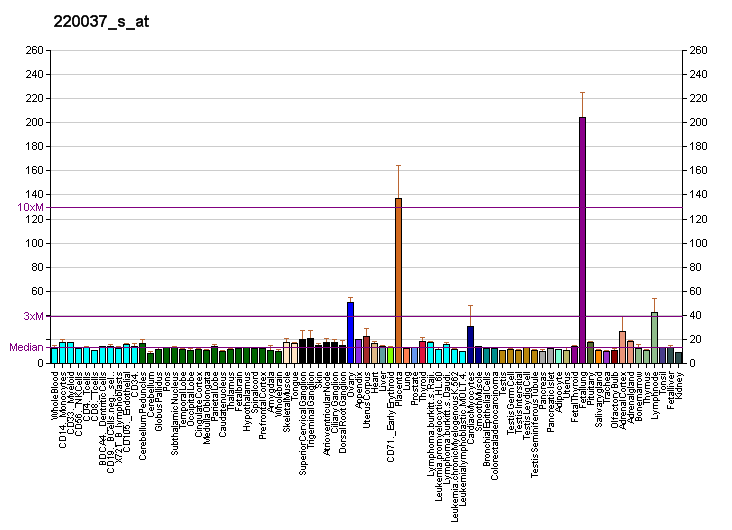
RNA expression pattern
Bgee	Human / Mouse (ortholog); Top expressed in: pericardium; synovial joint; right adrenal cortex; spleen; left adrenal gland; left adrenal cortex; thoracic diaphragm; Achilles tendon; gastric mucosa; left uterine tube / Top expressed in: endothelial cell of lymphatic vessel; mesenteric lymph nodes; right lung lobe; left lung lobe; dermis; ankle; lumbar spinal ganglion; atrioventricular valve; yolk sac; intercostal muscle; More reference expression data
BioGPS	More reference expression data
Gene ontology
Molecular function	protein binding; hyaluronic acid binding; transmembrane signaling receptor activity; signaling receptor activity
Cellular component	integral component of membrane; membrane; plasma membrane; integral component of plasma membrane; extracellular exosome; cell periphery
Biological process	hyaluronan catabolic process; anatomical structure morphogenesis; cell adhesion; response to wounding; glycosaminoglycan catabolic process; cell-matrix adhesion; signal transduction; transport
Sources:Amigo / QuickGO
Orthologs
Species	Human	Mouse
Entrez	10894	114332
Ensembl	ENSG00000133800	ENSMUSG00000030787
UniProt	Q9Y5Y7	Q8BHC0
RefSeq (mRNA)	NM_006691	NM_053247
RefSeq (protein)	NP_006682	NP_444477
Location (UCSC)	Chr 11: 10.56 – 10.61 Mb	Chr 7: 110.45 – 110.46 Mb
PubMed search
- Wikidata
View/Edit Human	View/Edit Mouse

Lymphatic vessel endothelial hyaluronan receptor 1 (LYVE1), also known as extracellular link domain containing 1 (XLKD1) is a Link domain-containing hyaladherin, a protein capable of binding to hyaluronic acid (HA), homologous to CD44, the main HA receptor. In humans it is encoded by the LYVE1 gene.

LYVE1 is a type I integral membrane glycoprotein. It acts as a receptor and binds to both soluble and immobilized hyaluronan. This protein may function in lymphatic hyaluronan transport and have a role in tumor metastasis. LYVE-1 is a cell surface receptor on lymphatic endothelial cells that can be used as a lymphatic endothelial cell marker, allowing for the isolation of these cells for experimental purposes. The physiological role for this receptor is still the subject of debate, but evolutionary conservation suggests an important role.

Expression of LYVE1 not restricted to lymph vessels but is also observed in normal liver blood sinusoids, and embryonic blood vessels.

LYVE1 expression is also observed in subset of macrophages. LYVE1 positive macrophages in the meninges of rats are both lymphatic, as well as, alymphatic. In brain dura, the LYVE1+ macrophages were predominantly pleomorphic in morphology, while the cells in the spinal cord were pleomorphic in the cervical dura, while in the thoracal dura the cells were mainly round in morphology. The cells in brain dura were associated with collagen network in meninges, and some nonlymphatic LYVE1+ macrophages contained intracellular collagen. The exact function of these cells is yet unknown.
