= Chondroitin-sulfate-ABC exolyase =

Enzyme

Identifiers
- EC no.: 4.2.2.21

Databases
- IntEnz: IntEnz view
- BRENDA: BRENDA entry
- ExPASy: NiceZyme view
- KEGG: KEGG entry
- MetaCyc: metabolic pathway
- PRIAM: profile
- PDB structures: RCSB PDB PDBe PDBsum
Search
- PMC: articles
- PubMed: articles
- NCBI: proteins

The enzyme chondroitin-sulfate-ABC exolyase (EC 4.2.2.21) catalyzes the following process:

Exolytic removal of Δ^{4}-unsaturated disaccharide residues from the non-reducing ends of both polymeric chondroitin/dermatan sulfates and their oligosaccharide fragments.

This enzyme belongs to the family of lyases, specifically those carbon-oxygen lyases acting on polysaccharides. The systematic name of this enzyme class is chondroitin-sulfate-ABC exolyase. Other names in common use include chondroitinase (ambiguous), chondroitin ABC eliminase (ambiguous), chondroitinase ABC (ambiguous), chondroitin ABC lyase (ambiguous), chondroitin sulfate ABC lyase (ambiguous), ChS ABC lyase (ambiguous), chondroitin sulfate ABC exoeliminase, chondroitin sulfate ABC exolyase, and ChS ABC lyase II.
