= Chondroitin ABC lyase =

Enzyme

chondroitin-sulfate-ABC endolyase

Identifiers
- EC no.: 4.2.2.20
- CAS no.: 9024-13-9

Databases
- IntEnz: IntEnz view
- BRENDA: BRENDA entry
- ExPASy: NiceZyme view
- KEGG: KEGG entry
- MetaCyc: metabolic pathway
- PRIAM: profile
- PDB structures: RCSB PDB PDBe PDBsum
Search
- PMC: articles
- PubMed: articles
- NCBI: proteins

chondroitin-sulfate-ABC exolyase

Identifiers
- EC no.: 4.2.2.21
- CAS no.: 9024-13-9

Databases
- IntEnz: IntEnz view
- BRENDA: BRENDA entry
- ExPASy: NiceZyme view
- KEGG: KEGG entry
- MetaCyc: metabolic pathway
- PRIAM: profile
- PDB structures: RCSB PDB PDBe PDBsum
Search
- PMC: articles
- PubMed: articles
- NCBI: proteins

Chondroitin ABC lyase (EC 4.2.2.20 EC 4.2.2.21, chondroitinase, chondroitin ABC eliminase, chondroitinase ABC) is an enzyme with systematic name chondroitin ABC lyase. This enzyme catalyses the following chemical reaction

Eliminative degradation of polysaccharides containing 1,4-beta-D-hexosaminyl and 1,3-beta-D-glucuronosyl or 1,3-alpha-L-iduronosyl linkages to disaccharides containing 4-deoxy-beta-D-gluc-4-enuronosyl groups

This enzyme acts on chondroitin 4-sulfate, chondroitin 6-sulfate and dermatan sulfate.

== Uses ==
Following a spinal cord injury, this enzyme can be used to erode scar tissue that can interfere with regeneration.
