= Versican =

Protein-coding gene in the species Homo sapiens

VCAN

Identifiers
- Aliases: VCAN, CSPG2, ERVR, GHAP, PG-M, WGN, WGN1, versican
- External IDs: OMIM: 118661; MGI: 102889; GeneCards: VCAN

Gene location (Human)
Chr.	Chromosome 5 (human)
Band	5q14.2-q14.3	Start	83,471,618 bp
Band	5q14.2-q14.3	End	83,582,303 bp

Gene location (Mouse)
Chr.	Chromosome 13 (mouse)
Band	13 C3|13 45.5 cM	Start	89,803,431 bp
Band	13 C3|13 45.5 cM	End	89,890,628 bp
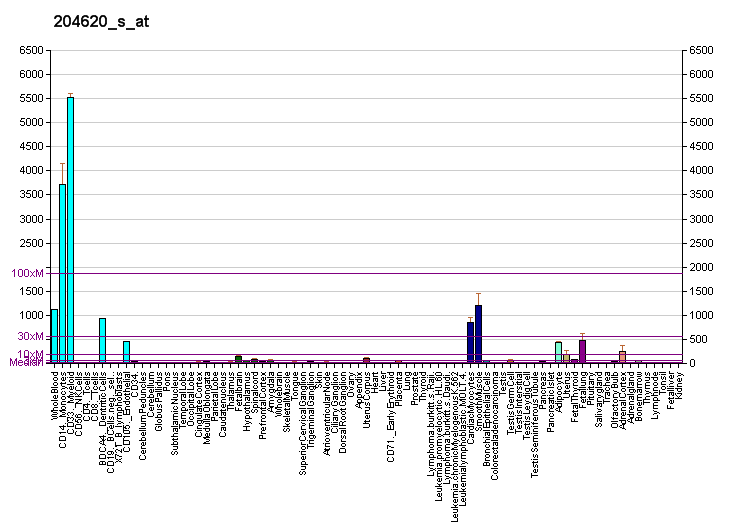

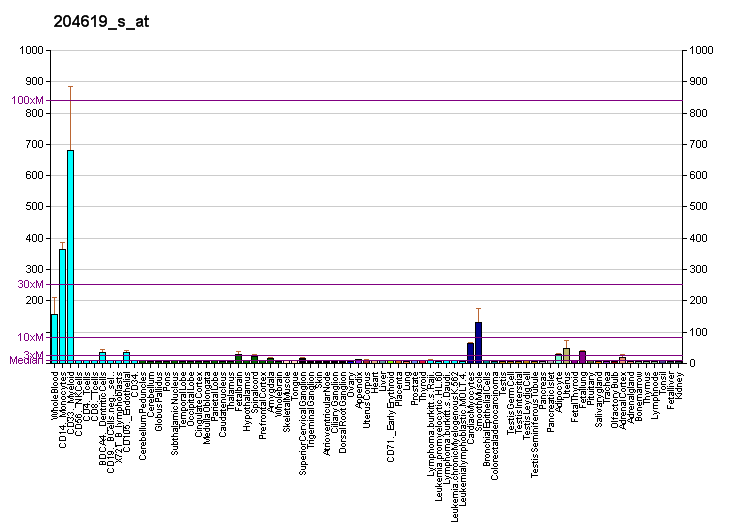

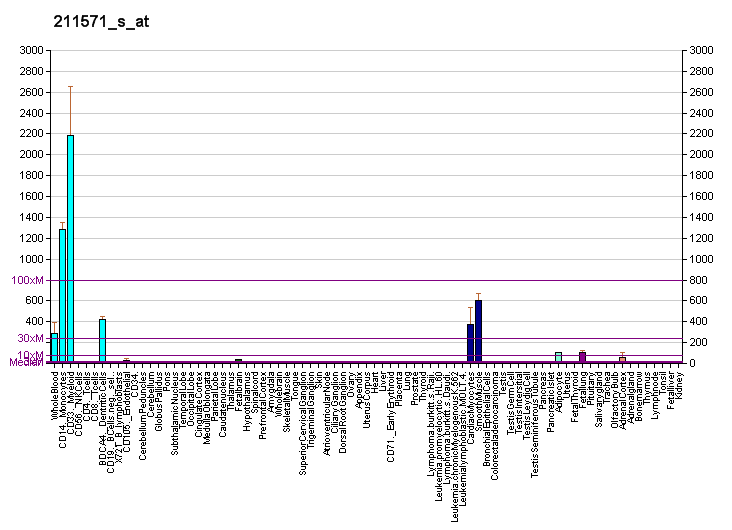
RNA expression pattern
Bgee	Human / Mouse (ortholog); Top expressed in: monocyte; pericardium; right coronary artery; ventricular zone; synovial joint; tendon of biceps brachii; saphenous vein; Descending thoracic aorta; trabecular bone; ascending aorta / Top expressed in: genital tubercle; vas deferens; tail of embryo; cumulus cell; semi-lunar valve; efferent ductule; maxillary prominence; hand; dermis; molar; More reference expression data
BioGPS	More reference expression data
Gene ontology
Molecular function	calcium ion binding; glycosaminoglycan binding; protein binding; carbohydrate binding; extracellular matrix structural constituent; hyaluronic acid binding; extracellular matrix structural constituent conferring compression resistance
Cellular component	membrane; extracellular matrix; lysosomal lumen; Golgi lumen; extracellular space; endoplasmic reticulum lumen; extracellular region; collagen-containing extracellular matrix; intracellular membrane-bounded organelle
Biological process	glycosaminoglycan metabolic process; skeletal system development; cell recognition; chondroitin sulfate biosynthetic process; extracellular matrix organization; multicellular organism development; central nervous system development; cell adhesion; osteoblast differentiation; chondroitin sulfate catabolic process; dermatan sulfate biosynthetic process; glial cell migration; post-translational protein modification
Sources:Amigo / QuickGO
Orthologs
Databases	NCBI: entry; OMA: entry
Species	Human	Mouse
Entrez	1462	13003
Ensembl	ENSG00000038427	ENSMUSG00000021614
UniProt	P13611; Q86W61	Q62059
RefSeq (mRNA)	NM_004385; NM_001126336; NM_001164097; NM_001164098	NM_001081249; NM_001134474; NM_001134475; NM_019389; NM_172955
RefSeq (protein)	NP_001119808; NP_001157569; NP_001157570; NP_004376; NP_001119808.1	n/a
Location (UCSC)	Chr 5: 83.47 – 83.58 Mb	Chr 13: 89.8 – 89.89 Mb
PubMed search
- Wikidata
View/Edit Human	View/Edit Mouse

Versican is a large extracellular matrix proteoglycan that is present in a variety of human tissues. It is encoded by the VCAN gene.

Versican is a large chondroitin sulfate proteoglycan with an apparent molecular mass of more than 1000kDa. In 1989, Zimmermann and Ruoslahti cloned and sequenced the core protein of fibroblast chondroitin sulfate proteoglycan. They designated it versican in recognition of its versatile modular structure.

Versican belongs to the lectican protein family, with aggrecan (abundant in cartilage), brevican and neurocan (nervous system proteoglycans) as other members. Versican is also known as chondroitin sulfate proteoglycan core protein 2 or chondroitin sulfate proteoglycan 2 (CSPG2), and PG-M.

== Structure ==
These proteoglycans share a homologous globular N-terminal, C-terminal, and glycosaminoglycan (GAG) binding regions.

The N-terminal (G1) globular domain consists of Ig-like loop and two link modules, and has Hyaluronan (HA) binding properties.

Versican occurs in 5 isoforms : V0, V1, V2, V3, V4. The central domain of versican V0 contains both the GAG-α and GAG-β domains. V1 isoforms has the GAG-β domain, V2 has the GAG-α domain, V3 is void of any GAG attachment domains and V4 has a portion of the GAG-β domain. The GAGs, being composed of repeating disaccharide units, contribute to the negative charge and many other properties of proteoglycans.

The C-terminal (G3) globular domain consists of one or two Epidermal growth factor (EGF) repeats, a C-type lectin domain and complement regulatory protein (CRP)-like domain. The C-terminal domain binds a variety of ligands in ECM which contribute significantly to the functions of lecticans.

== Function ==
The role of versican in cell adhesion, migration, and proliferation has been extensively studied. Versican is often considered an anti-adhesion molecule. Considering the large size (>1000 kDa) and hydration capability of versican, it is possible that the interaction of integrins (large family of cell adhesion molecules) with their cell surface receptors is sterically hindered.

Expression of versican is observed in various adult tissues such as blood vessels, skin, and developing heart. Smooth muscle cells of blood vessels, epithelial cells of skin, and the cells of central and peripheral nervous system are a few examples of cell types that express versican physiologically. Versican is involved in development, guiding embryonic cell migration important in the formation of the heart and outlining the path for neural crest cell migration.

=== N-terminus ===
The N-terminal of versican has an important role in maintaining the integrity of the ECM by interacting with hyaluronan. Its interactions with link protein has also been studied.

=== Glycosaminoglycan binding region ===
The central domain of Versican is decorated with glycosaminoglycans. The structural and functional diversity of Versican is increased by variations in GAG sulfation patterns and the type of GAG chains bound to the core protein. There is a single versican gene, however alternative splicing of its mRNA produces 4 distinct versican isoforms that differ in their potential number of GAG chains. All isoforms have homologous N-terminal (HA binding) and C-terminal (lectin-like) domains. The central domain of versican V0 contains both the GAG-α and GAG-β domains. V1 isoforms has the GAG-β domain, V2 has the GAG-α domain, and V3 is void of any GAG attachment domains, and only consists of the N-terminal and C-terminal globular domains. It is known that the isoforms are differentially expressed in different tissue types. The biological significance of alternative splicing is yet to be determined.

Because of their negatively charged sulfates or carboxyl groups, chondroitin sulfate chains are attracted to various positively charged molecules such as certain growth factors, cytokines, and chemokines. This interaction in the extracellular matrix or on the cell surface is important in the formation of immobilized gradients of these factors, their protection from proteolytic cleavage, and their presentation to specific cell-surface receptors. The binding of versican with leukocyte adhesion molecules L-selectin, P-selectin, and CD44 is also mediated by the interaction of CS chains of versican with the carbohydrate-binding domain of these molecules. Both CD44 and L-selectin have been implicated in leukocyte trafficking. The ability of versican to bind a large panel of chemokines and the biological consequences of such binding has also been examined. Versican can bind specific chemokines through its CS chains and this interaction down-regulates the chemokines function. Recently, in light of results that V1 and V2 isoforms of versican have opposite effects on cell proliferation, glycosaminoglycan domain GAG-β has been implicated in versican-enhanced cell proliferation and versican-induced reduction of cell apoptosis.

=== C-terminus ===
The C-terminal of Versican interacts with a variety of molecules in the matrix. One important family of ligands is the tenascin family. For example, The C-lectin domain of versican interacts with tenascin R through its fibronectin type III (FnIII) repeat 3-5 domain in a calcium dependent manner, in vivo. Different tenascin domains interact with a wide range of cellular receptors, including integrins, cell adhesion molecules and members of the syndecan and glypican proteoglycan families. Versican’s C-terminal domain interacts with fibulin-2, a protein whose expression is associated with that of versican in the developing heart. The EGF domain of the C-terminal of versican also binds the EGF-receptor molecule in vivo.

== Clinical significance ==
Versican is a key factor in inflammation through interactions with adhesion molecules on the surfaces of inflammatory leukocytes and interactions with chemokines that are involved in recruiting inflammatory cells.

In the adult central nervous system, versican is found in perineuronal nets, where it may stabilize synaptic connections. Versican can also inhibit nervous system regeneration and axonal growth following an injury to the central nervous system.

=== Cancer and metastasis ===
Increased versican expression is often observed in tumor growth in tissues such as breast, brain, ovary, gastrointestinal tract, prostate, and melanoma, sarcoma, and peritoneal mesothelioma. A fifth isoform of versican, V4, that is similar to V1 but with a shortened beta-GAG region, is present and upregulated in human breast cancer.

Versican is required for Lewis lung carcinoma in mice to metastasize to lung, liver and adrenal glands, acting via TLR2 to activate myeloid cells and produce TNF-alpha.

=== Lung disorders ===
Versican is increased in the changing tissue extracellular matrix in inflammatory lung disorders such as chronic obstructive pulmonary disease (COPD), asthma and bronchiolitis obliterans syndrome (BOS). Cells (myofibroblasts, macrophages and other inflammatory cells) can migrate more easily through extracellular matrix that has a higher versican content.

=== Skin disorders ===
Deposits of versican are not present in normal skin but are found in the reticular dermis during keloid scarring, a condition where scar formation becomes uncontrolled and overgrowth of skin tissue occurs at the site of the wound.

== Interactions ==
Versican has been shown to interact with hyaluronan and a link protein (hyaluronan and proteoglycan link protein 1; HAPLN1).
