= Chondroitin sulfate proteoglycan =

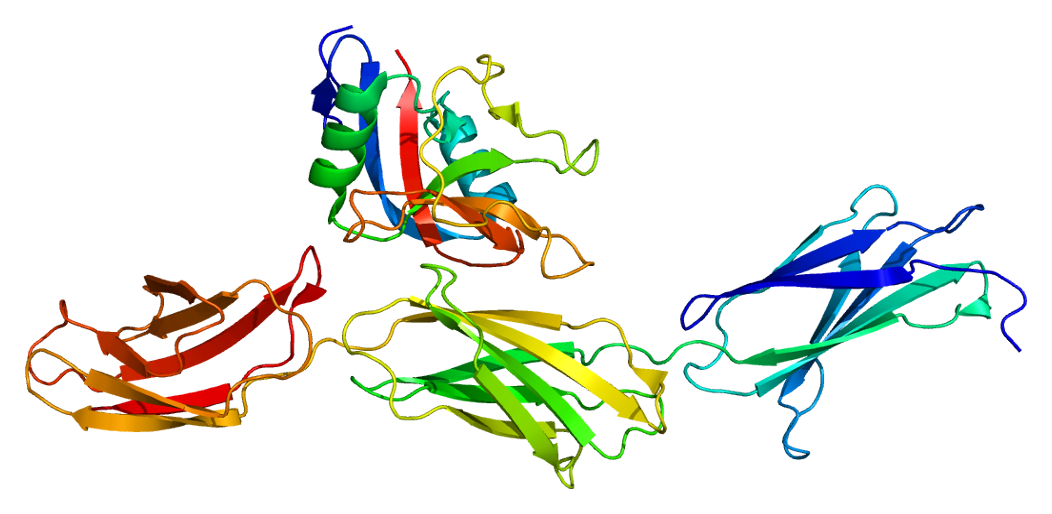
Structure of the protein core of aggrecan or chondroitin sulfate proteoglycan 1

Chondroitin sulfate proteoglycans (CSPGs) are proteoglycans consisting of a protein core and a chondroitin sulfate side chain. They are known to be structural components of a variety of human tissues, including cartilage, and also play key roles in neural development and glial scar formation. They are known to be involved in certain cell processes, such as cell adhesion, cell growth, receptor binding, cell migration, and interaction with other extracellular matrix constituents. They are also known to interact with laminin, fibronectin, tenascin, and collagen. CSPGs are generally secreted from cells.

Importantly, CSPGs are known to inhibit axon regeneration after spinal cord injury. CSPGs contribute to glial scar formation post injury, acting as a barrier against new axons growing into the injury site. CSPGs play a crucial role in explaining why the spinal cord doesn't self-regenerate after an injury.

== General structure ==
Chondroitin sulfate proteoglycans are composed of a core protein and a sugar side chain. The core protein is generally a glycoprotein, and the side chains are glycosaminoglycan (GAG) sugar chains attached through a covalent bond. The GAG side chains are of different lengths depending on the CSPG. Each GAG chain consists of a linear pattern of alternating monosaccharide units: uronic acid and either N-acetylglucosamine or N-acetylgalactosamine.

=== Types ===
The following CSPGs have been identified:

- Aggrecan (CSPG1)
- Versican (CSPG2)
- Neurocan (CSPG3)
- CSPG4 (melanoma-associated chondroitin sulfate proteoglycan, NG2)
- CSPG5
- SMC3 (CSPG6, structural maintenance of chromosomes 3)
- Brevican (CSPG7)
- CD44 (CSPG8, cluster of differentiation 44)
- Phosphacan

Neurocan, brevican, versican, and aggrecan all share similar N-terminal and C-terminal domains.

== Neural development ==
CSPGs play an active role in the neural development of postnatal babies. During development, CSPGs act as guidance cues for developing growth cones. CSPGs guide growth cones through the use of negative signals, as seen by the fact that growing axons avoid CSPG dense areas. Tests done on embryonic roof plates, located on the dorsal midline of developing spinal cords, support this. CSPGs were found near and around the embryonic roof plates that inhibited axon elongation through the spinal cord, and directed the axons in another direction, but were absent in roof plates that attracted axon elongation. These results suggest that CSPGs act in neural development as an inhibitory signal to help guide growing axons.

== Spinal cord injury ==
CSPGs have been implicated in inhibiting axonal regeneration and neurogenesis after central nervous system injury. CSPGs are known to be part of the glial scar that forms post injury, acting as a barrier to prevent axon extension and regrowth. Studies examining CSPG (neurocan, brevican, versican, and phosphacan) levels in rats before spinal cord injury and after spinal cord injury indicate that there is a large up-regulation of these CSPGs after injury is induced. Neurocan, brevican, and versican levels are up-regulated one day post injury, and neurocan and versican remain elevated 4 weeks post injury (brevican remained elevated at 8 weeks post injury, the final time point in the study). Phosphacan showed no up-regulation until 4 weeks post injury. These results, along with previous results showing CSPGs inhibit axon growth, suggest that these four CSPGs work together to inhibit axon growth in spinal cord injury.

== Regulation ==
=== Inhibition of EGFR inhibits CSPGs ===
Epidermal growth factor receptor (EGFR) has been suggested to regulate CSPG function. Inhibiting EGFR has been shown to block the activities of certain CSPGs, including neurocan, phosphacan, versican, and aggrecan. When EGFR was inactive, CSPGs had little effect on neurons. As a result, neurogenesis occurred, with significantly longer and many more neurons forming than seen with EGFR active. When EGFR is active, CSPG functioned normally, restricting neurogenesis. Drugs manipulating EGFR may be helpful in preventing the adverse effects CSPGs have during spinal cord injury.

=== PTP-sigma is a CSPG receptor ===
PTP-sigma (a transmembrane protein tyrosine phosphatase) is a recently discovered receptor for CSPGs, and is important for proper CSPG function. PTP-sigma binds with very high affinity to CSPGs, specifically neurocan and aggrecan. To simulate more physiological situations, researchers looked at PTP-sigma effects on spinal cord injury sites in mice. Mice with induced spinal cord injury lacking PTP-sigma showed significantly more axon regrowth, with normal amounts of CSPG present. This suggests that without PTP-sigma, CSPGs cannot bind to anything to function properly at the site of a glial scar. Because PTP-sigma is a functional receptor for CSPGs and promotes proper function of CSPGs, drugs manipulating PTP-sigma may help patients with spinal cord injury.

=== Interferon-gamma ===
Interferon-gamma (IFN-gamma) is a cytokine that is useful against fighting bacterial infections and helping to suppress tumors. It has also been shown to be beneficial in decreasing CSPG expression after spinal cord injury. Using immunohistochemistry, scientists have shown that CSPGs at the site of spinal cord injury in mice were significantly decreased when treated with IFN-gamma compared to mice without IFN-gamma treatments. Control mice had 80% more levels of CSPGs after spinal cord injury compared to mice treated with IFN-gamma, and scientists suggest that IFN-gamma works by inhibiting mRNA expression.

=== Rho/ROCK pathway mediates CSPGs ===
The CSPG inhibition of axon regrowth and neurogenesis post spinal cord injury has been shown to be associated with the rho-associated protein kinase (ROCK) pathway. Studies have shown that when CSPGs inhibit axon growth in the glial scar, the ROCK pathway is activated. However, using C3 transferase and Y27632, two inhibitors of the ROCK signaling pathway, researchers showed that neurogenesis and new neuron length both significantly increased. With C3 transferase, there was a 57% increase in new neuron length, and Y27632 produced a 77% increase in length. Neurogenesis was greatly improved, but not quantifiable. Deactivating the ROCK pathway greatly decreased CSPG inhibition of axon regrowth. These results indicate that the CSPG effect of neurogenesis inhibition is mediated through the ROCK pathway.

== In disease ==
Chondroitin sulfate proteoglycans have been implicated in Alzheimer's disease, stroke, and epilepsy.

=== Alzheimer's ===
The two primary markers of Alzheimer's disease are neurofibrillary tangles (NFT) and senile plaques (SP). Studies have shown that CSPGs are present in the frontal cortex and hippocampus NFTs and SPs of postmortem brains of Alzheimer's patients. CSPG-4 and CSPG-6 are both localized on the perimeter of NFTs and SPs, and were also found on dystrophic neurons as well. Given CSPGs inhibitory effects, these results suggest that CSPGs play an important role in Alzheimer's Disease progression, and could be responsible for facilitating the regression of neurons around NFTs and SPs. Medications that target the CSPGs in the NFT and SP may help to alleviate some of the symptoms of Alzheimer's disease.

=== Stroke ===
A stroke is a sudden loss of brain function due to either a blood clot or blood leakage in the brain. Often, a stroke seriously debilitates the patient. However, in those patients that do regain some brain function in affected areas, down-regulations of CSPGs are shown to occur. After stroke, plasticity occurs in some regions of the brain and is associated with some return of brain function. Rats that were able to recover from induced stroke had down-regulations of several CSPGs, including aggrecan, versican, and phosphacan Rats that did not return any brain function did not have significant down-regulation of CSPGs. The reduction of CSPGs in rats that returned some brain function after stroke suggest that more neurological connections could be made with less CSPGs present. Medications that are able to down-regulate CSPGs may help return more brain function to stroke patients.

=== Epilepsy ===
Epilepsy is a neurological disorder characterized by excessive neurological activity in the brain, causing seizures. Researchers have observed that CSPGs are somewhat removed from the brain in epilepsy patients. Research has shown a decrease in phosphacan in both the temporal lobe and the hippocampus in epilepsy cases, suggesting that there CSPGs play a role in the control of axonal regrowth.
