= Aggrecan =

Protein that in humans is encoded by the ACAN gene

ACAN
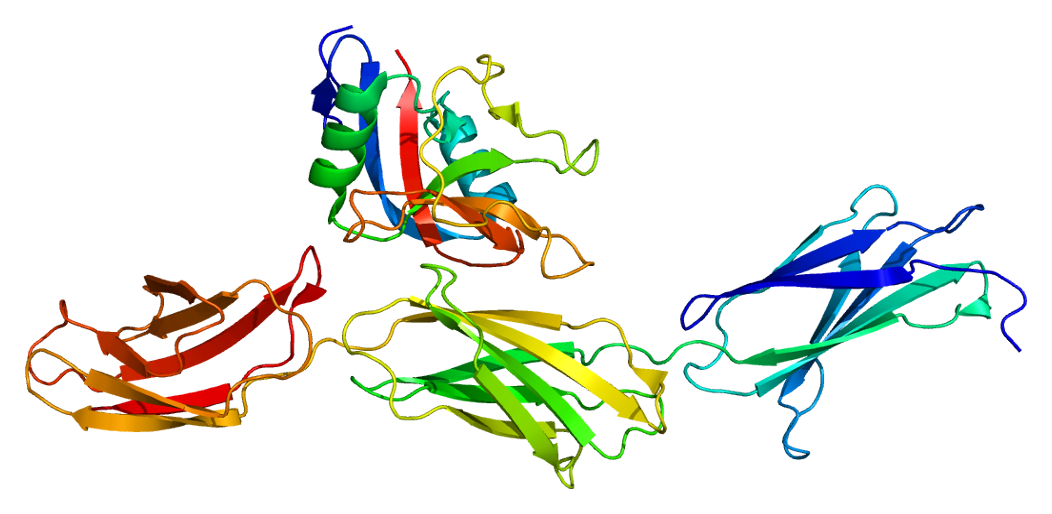

Identifiers
- Aliases: ACAN, AGC1, AGCAN, CSPG1, CSPGCP, MSK16, SEDK, Aggrecan, SSOAOD
- External IDs: OMIM: 155760; MGI: 99602; GeneCards: ACAN
Available structures
PDB	Ortholog search: PDBe RCSB
PDB	List of PDB id codes 4MD4

Gene location (Human)
Chr.	Chromosome 15 (human)
Band	15q26.1	Start	88,803,436 bp
Band	15q26.1	End	88,875,353 bp

Gene location (Mouse)
Chr.	Chromosome 7 (mouse)
Band	7 D2|7 44.88 cM	Start	78,703,231 bp
Band	7 D2|7 44.88 cM	End	78,764,847 bp
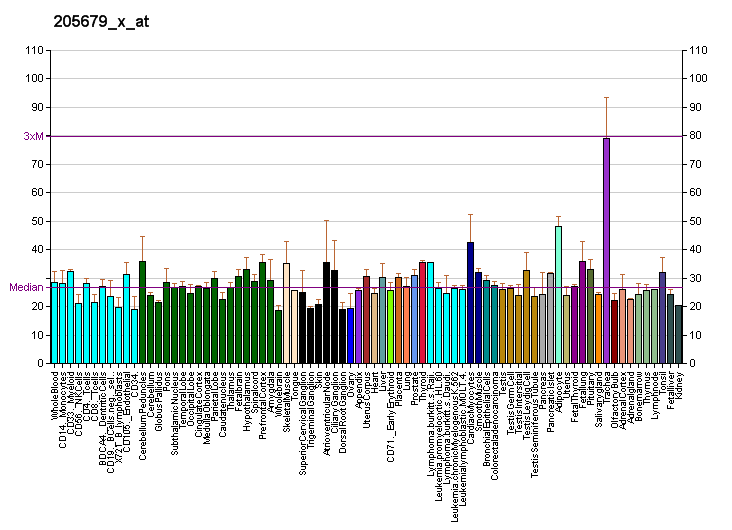

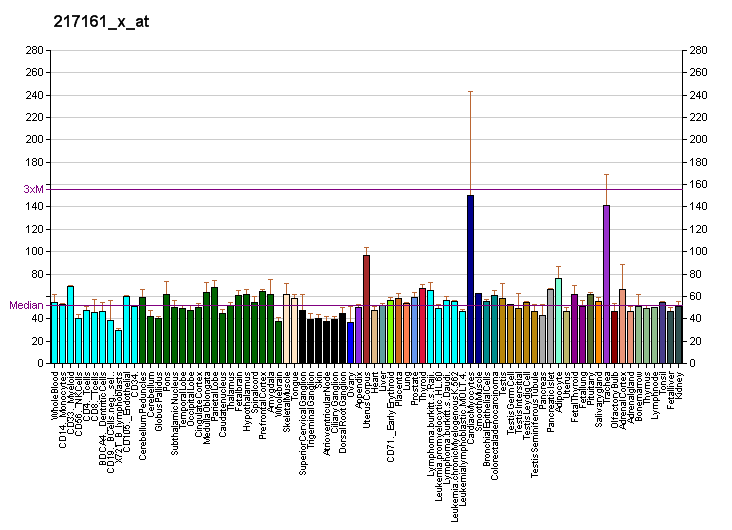

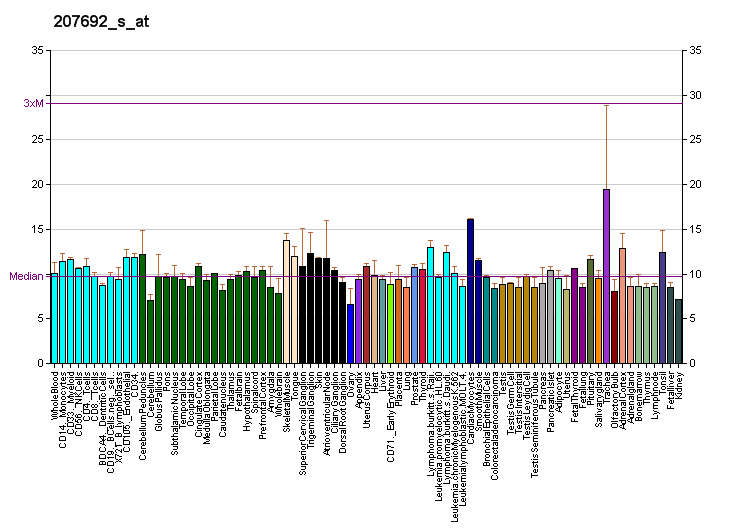
RNA expression pattern
Bgee	Human / Mouse (ortholog); Top expressed in: tibia; cartilage tissue; Descending thoracic aorta; popliteal artery; tibial arteries; tendon of biceps brachii; ascending aorta; middle frontal gyrus; trachea; Achilles tendon / Top expressed in: fossa; condyle; intercostal muscle; tibiofemoral joint; trachea; ascending aorta; ankle; skin of external ear; lumbar subsegment of spinal cord; aortic valve; More reference expression data
BioGPS	More reference expression data
Gene ontology
Molecular function	extracellular matrix structural constituent; metal ion binding; protein binding; hyaluronic acid binding; carbohydrate binding; extracellular matrix structural constituent conferring compression resistance
Cellular component	extracellular matrix; extracellular region; lysosomal lumen; Golgi lumen; basement membrane; collagen-containing extracellular matrix; perisynaptic extracellular matrix; glutamatergic synapse; GABA-ergic synapse
Biological process	skeletal system development; extracellular matrix disassembly; extracellular matrix organization; proteolysis; central nervous system development; keratan sulfate catabolic process; keratan sulfate biosynthetic process; cell adhesion; cartilage condensation; chondrocyte development; development of the heart; proteoglycan biosynthetic process; collagen fibril organization
Sources:Amigo / QuickGO
Orthologs
Databases	NCBI: entry; OMA: entry
Species	Human	Mouse
Entrez	176	11595
Ensembl	ENSG00000157766	ENSMUSG00000030607
UniProt	P16112	Q61282
RefSeq (mRNA)	NM_001135; NM_013227; NM_001369268	NM_007424; NM_001361500
RefSeq (protein)	NP_001126; NP_037359; NP_001356197	NP_031450; NP_001348429
Location (UCSC)	Chr 15: 88.8 – 88.88 Mb	Chr 7: 78.7 – 78.76 Mb
PubMed search
- Wikidata
View/Edit Human	View/Edit Mouse

Aggrecan (ACAN), also known as cartilage-specific proteoglycan core protein (CSPCP) or chondroitin sulfate proteoglycan 1, is a protein that in humans is encoded by the ACAN gene. This gene is a member of the lectican (chondroitin sulfate proteoglycan) family. The encoded protein is an integral part of the extracellular matrix in cartilagenous tissue and it withstands compression in cartilage.

Aggrecan is a proteoglycan, or a protein modified with large carbohydrates; the human form of the protein is 2316 amino acids long and can be expressed in multiple isoforms due to alternative splicing. Aggrecan was named for its ability to form large aggregates in the cartilage tissue (a large aggregating proteoglycan).

== Structure ==
Aggrecan is a high molecular weight (molar mass between 1 million and 3 million) proteoglycan. It exhibits a bottlebrush structure, in which chondroitin sulfate and keratan sulfate glycosaminoglycan (GAG) chains are attached to an extended protein core.

Aggrecan has a molecular mass >2,500 kDa. The core protein (~300 kDa) has around 100 GAG chains attached to it.

Aggrecan consists of two globular structural domains (G1 and G2) at the N-terminal end and one globular domain (G3) at the C-terminal end, separated by a large extended domain (CS) heavily modified with GAGs. (N-G1-G2-CS-G3-C) The two main modifier moieties are themselves arranged into distinct regions, a chondroitin sulfate and a keratan sulfate region.

The three globular domains, G1, G2, and G3 are involved in aggregation, hyaluronan binding, cell adhesion, and chondrocyte apoptosis.

Recent molecular simulations and neutron scattering experiments suggested that aggrecan in aqueous solutions forms two-dimensional aggregates that resemble sheet-like shapes.

Along with type-II collagen, aggrecan forms a major structural component of cartilage, particularly articular cartilage.

The aggrecan family includes other important members such as versican, also named PG-M, neurocan, brevican and the cell surface HA receptor CD44. They are modular proteoglycans containing combinations of structural motifs, such as EGF-like domains, carbohydrate recognition domains (CRD), complement binding protein (CBP)-like domains, immunoglobulin folds and proteoglycan tandem repeats.

== Function ==
Aggrecan is a critical component for cartilage structure and the function of joints.

Functionally, the G1 domain interacts with hyaluronic acid and link protein, forming stable ternary complexes in the extracellular matrix. G2 is homologous to the tandem repeats of G1 and of link protein and is involved in product processing. G3 makes up the carboxyl terminus of the core protein. It enhances glycosaminoglycan modification and product secretion. Aggrecan plays an important role in mediating chondrocyte-chondrocyte and chondrocyte-matrix interactions through its ability to bind hyaluronan.

Aggrecan provides intervertebral disc and cartilage with the ability to resist compressive loads. The localized high concentrations of aggrecan provide the osmotic properties necessary for normal tissue function with the GAGs producing the swelling pressure that counters compressive loads on the tissue. This functional ability is dependent on a high GAG/aggrecan concentration being present in the tissue extracellular matrix. In the disc, aggrecan concentrations peak in a person's twenties, and decline thereafter, with aggrecan degradation products slowly accumulating over the following decades. This causes discs to get stiffer and less resilient with age.

Aggrecan also plays an important role in the organization of the extracellular spaces between neurons in the brain. Through interactions with link protein and tenascins, aggrecan binds to hyaluronan, forming large aggregated complexes at the cell surface.

== Clinical significance ==
The synthesis and degradation of aggrecan are being investigated for their roles in cartilage deterioration during joint injury, disease, and aging.

The linker domain between the N-terminal globular domains, called the interglobular domain, is highly sensitive to proteolysis. Such degradation has been associated with the development of arthritis. Proteases capable of degrading aggrecans are called aggrecanases, and they are members of the ADAM (A Disintegrin And Metalloprotease) protein family.

Degenerative joint disease is a leading source of morbidity resulting in significant social and economic impact. Osteoarthritis is characterized by the slow progressive deterioration of articular cartilage and fibrosis of the synovium and joint capsule. Articular cartilage contains up to 10% proteoglycan by weight, most of which is aggrecan, and its loss is an early sign of the disease.
