= Neurocan =

Protein-coding gene in the species Homo sapiens

NCAN

Identifiers
- Aliases: NCAN, CSPG3, neurocan
- External IDs: OMIM: 600826; MGI: 104694; GeneCards: NCAN

Gene location (Human)
Chr.	Chromosome 19 (human)
Band	19p13.11	Start	19,211,958 bp
Band	19p13.11	End	19,252,233 bp

Gene location (Mouse)
Chr.	Chromosome 8 (mouse)
Band	8 B3.3|8 34.15 cM	Start	70,545,735 bp
Band	8 B3.3|8 34.15 cM	End	70,573,523 bp
RNA expression pattern
Bgee	Human / Mouse (ortholog); Top expressed in: ventricular zone; ganglionic eminence; Region I of hippocampus proper; postcentral gyrus; superior frontal gyrus; middle frontal gyrus; entorhinal cortex; Brodmann area 46; frontal pole; Brodmann area 10 / Top expressed in: ganglionic eminence; ventricular zone; olfactory bulb; Rostral migratory stream; olfactory tubercle; prefrontal cortex; barrel cortex; nucleus accumbens; superior frontal gyrus; dentate gyrus of hippocampal formation granule cell; More reference expression data
BioGPS	n/a
Gene ontology
Molecular function	calcium ion binding; hyaluronic acid binding; carbohydrate binding; extracellular matrix structural constituent
Cellular component	Golgi lumen; extracellular region; lysosomal lumen; extracellular matrix
Biological process	chondroitin sulfate catabolic process; skeletal system development; central nervous system development; chondroitin sulfate biosynthetic process; extracellular matrix organization; dermatan sulfate biosynthetic process; cell adhesion
Sources:Amigo / QuickGO
Orthologs
Databases	NCBI: entry; OMA: entry
Species	Human	Mouse
Entrez	1463	13004
Ensembl	ENSG00000130287	ENSMUSG00000002341
UniProt	O14594	P55066
RefSeq (mRNA)	NM_004386	NM_007789
RefSeq (protein)	NP_004377	NP_031815
Location (UCSC)	Chr 19: 19.21 – 19.25 Mb	Chr 8: 70.55 – 70.57 Mb
PubMed search
- Wikidata
View/Edit Human	View/Edit Mouse

Neurocan core protein is a protein that in humans is encoded by the NCAN gene.

Neurocan is a member of the lectican / chondroitin sulfate proteoglycan protein families and consists of neurocan core protein and chondroitin sulfate. It is thought to be involved in the modulation of cell adhesion and migration.

== Role in bipolar disorder ==
Neurocan is a significant component of the extracellular matrix, and its levels are modulated by a variety of factors, but mice in which the NCAN gene has been knocked out show no easily observable defects in brain development or behavior. However, a genome-wide association study published in 2011 identified Neurocan as a susceptibility factor for bipolar disorder. A more comprehensive study published in 2012 confirmed that association. The 2012 study examined correlations between NCAN alleles and various symptoms of bipolar disorder, and also examined the behavior of NCAN knockout mice. In the human subjects, it was found that NCAN genotype was strongly associated with manic symptoms but not with depressive symptoms. In the mice, the absence of functional Neurocan resulted in a variety of manic-like behaviors, which could be normalized by administering lithium.
