= Brevican =

Protein found in humans

BCAN

Identifiers
- Aliases: BCAN, BEHAB, CSPG7, Brevican
- External IDs: OMIM: 600347; MGI: 1096385; GeneCards: BCAN

Gene location (Human)
Chr.	Chromosome 1 (human)
Band	1q23.1	Start	156,641,390 bp
Band	1q23.1	End	156,659,532 bp

Gene location (Mouse)
Chr.	Chromosome 3 (mouse)
Band	3 F1|3 38.78 cM	Start	87,987,531 bp
Band	3 F1|3 38.78 cM	End	88,000,230 bp
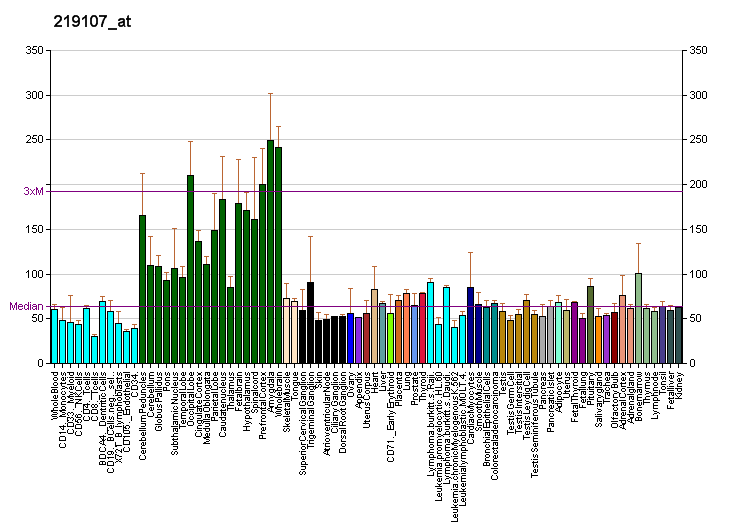

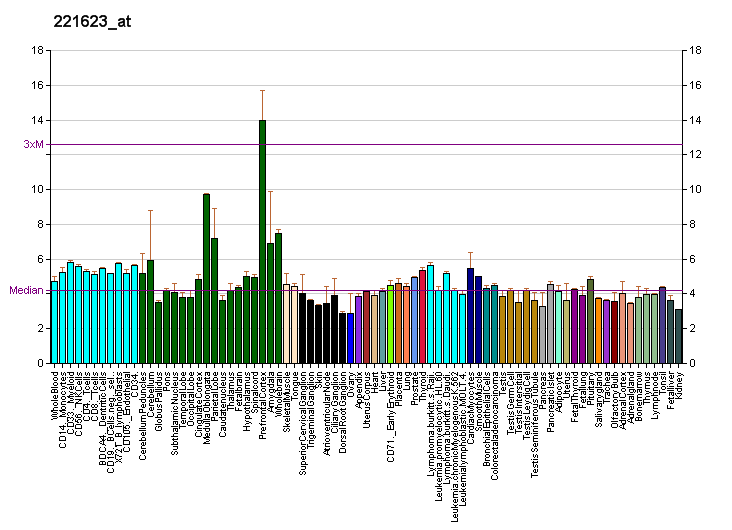

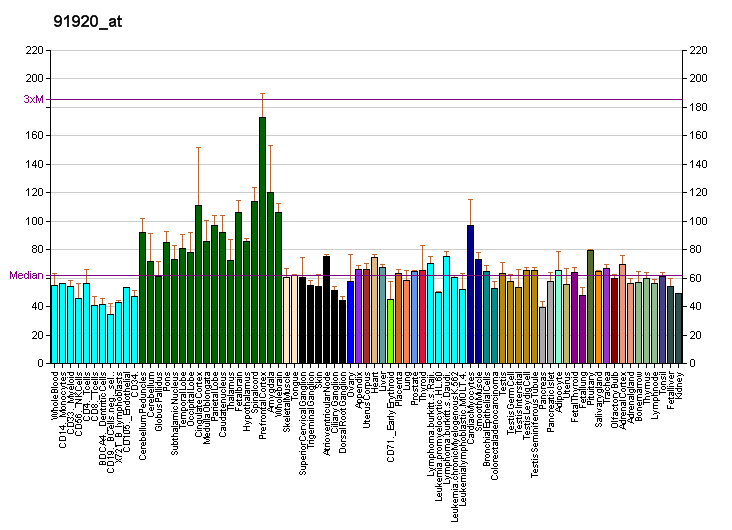
RNA expression pattern
Bgee	Human / Mouse (ortholog); Top expressed in: ventricular zone; amygdala; anterior cingulate cortex; right frontal lobe; nucleus accumbens; caudate nucleus; putamen; ganglionic eminence; prefrontal cortex; Brodmann area 9 / Top expressed in: superior frontal gyrus; entorhinal cortex; primary visual cortex; perirhinal cortex; CA3 field; dentate gyrus of hippocampal formation granule cell; cerebellar cortex; central gray substance of midbrain; nucleus of stria terminalis; superior colliculus; More reference expression data
BioGPS	More reference expression data
Gene ontology
Molecular function	hyaluronic acid binding; carbohydrate binding; extracellular matrix structural constituent
Cellular component	membrane; extracellular region; lysosomal lumen; Golgi lumen; anchored component of membrane; extracellular matrix; glutamatergic synapse
Biological process	skeletal system development; chondroitin sulfate biosynthetic process; extracellular matrix organization; central nervous system development; chondroitin sulfate catabolic process; dermatan sulfate biosynthetic process; hippocampus development; cell adhesion; synapse maturation
Sources:Amigo / QuickGO
Orthologs
Databases	NCBI: entry; OMA: entry
Species	Human	Mouse
Entrez	63827	12032
Ensembl	ENSG00000132692	ENSMUSG00000004892
UniProt	Q96GW7	Q61361
RefSeq (mRNA)	NM_021948; NM_198427	NM_001109758; NM_007529
RefSeq (protein)	NP_068767; NP_940819	NP_001103228; NP_031555
Location (UCSC)	Chr 1: 156.64 – 156.66 Mb	Chr 3: 87.99 – 88 Mb
PubMed search
- Wikidata
View/Edit Human	View/Edit Mouse

Brevican core protein is a protein that in humans is encoded by the BCAN gene. Brevican is a member of the lectican protein family.

Brevican is localised to the surface of neurons in the brain. In melanocytic cells, BCAN gene expression may be regulated by MITF.

Brevican is involved in maintaining molecule networks around neurons and may possibly be associated with slower brain ageing and Alzheimer's prevention.
