= ADAMTS =

Family of protease enzymes

ADAMTS (short for a disintegrin and metalloproteinase with thrombospondin motifs) is a family of multidomain extracellular protease enzymes. Nineteen members of this family have been identified in humans, the first of which, ADAMTS1, was described in 1997. Known functions of the ADAMTS proteases include processing of procollagens and von Willebrand factor as well as cleavage of aggrecan, versican, brevican and neurocan, making them key remodeling enzymes of the extracellular matrix. They have been demonstrated to have important roles in connective tissue organization, coagulation, inflammation, arthritis, angiogenesis and cell migration. Homologous subfamily of ADAMTSL (ADAMTS-like) proteins, which lack enzymatic activity, has also been described. Most cases of thrombotic thrombocytopenic purpura arise from autoantibody-mediated inhibition of ADAMTS13.

Like ADAMs, the name of the ADAMTS family refers to its disintegrin and metalloproteinase activity, and in the case of ADAMTS, the presence of a thrombospondin motif.

== ADAMTS family members ==
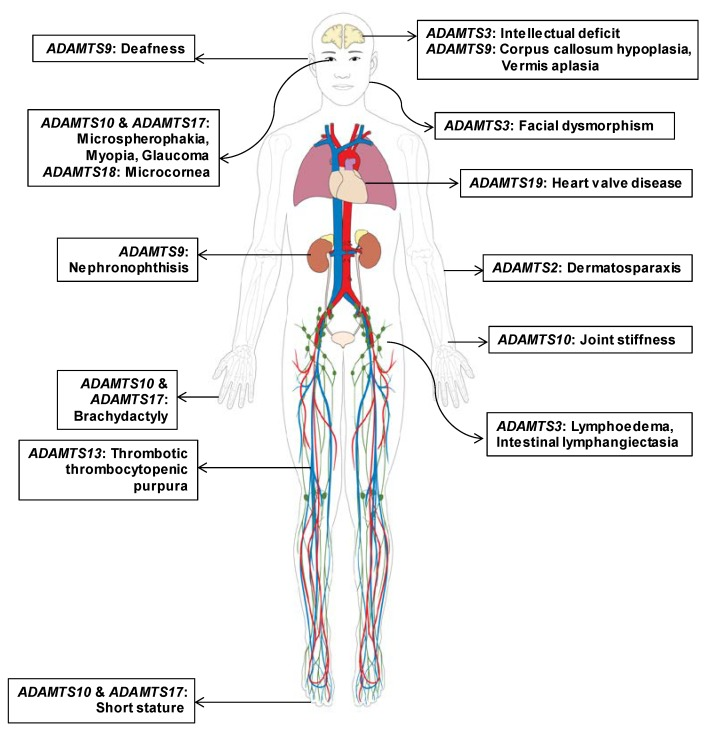
Clinical findings and distribution of affected organs in individuals with Mendelian disorders caused by pathogenic mutations in different ADAMTS family genes. Predominant and recurrently reported clinical presentations of eight ADAMTS genes with a strong causal relationship to Mendelian disorders are marked according to organ. Heterogeneous distribution of affected organ types indicates the phenotypic heterogeneity among hereditary disorders caused by pathogenic germline mutations in ADAMTS genes. From a review by Rim et al., 2020

- ADAMTS1 (or METH-1), an antiangiogenic
- ADAMTS2
- ADAMTS3
- ADAMTS4
- ADAMTS5 (=ADAMTS11)
- ADAMTS6
- ADAMTS7
- ADAMTS8 (or METH-2), an antiangiogenic
- ADAMTS9
- ADAMTS10
- ADAMTS12
- ADAMTS13
- ADAMTS14
- ADAMTS15
- ADAMTS16
- ADAMTS17
- ADAMTS18
- ADAMTS19
- ADAMTS20

== See also ==
- A disintegrin and metalloproteinase (ADAM) family
- ADAMTSL family (ADAMTS-like proteins)
