= Thrombospondin =

Thrombospondin type 1 domain
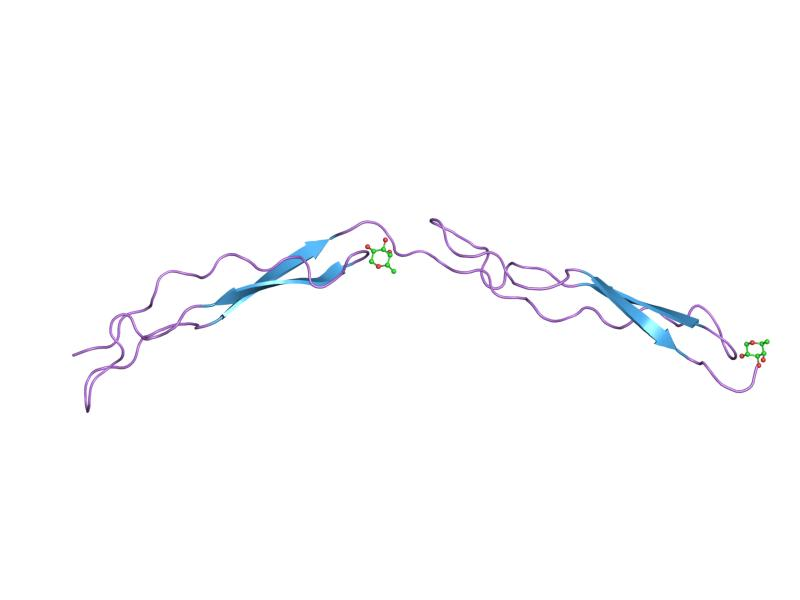
- Thrombospondin-1

Identifiers
- Symbol: TSP_1
- Pfam: PF00090
- InterPro: IPR000884
- SMART: SM00209
- PROSITE: PS50092
- SCOP2: 1lsl / SCOPe / SUPFAM
Available protein structures:
- PDB: IPR000884 PF00090 (ECOD; PDBsum)
- AlphaFold: IPR000884; PF00090

Thrombospondins (TSPs) are a family of secreted glycoproteins with antiangiogenic functions. Due to their dynamic role within the extracellular matrix they are considered matricellular proteins. The first member of the family, thrombospondin 1 (THBS1), was discovered in 1971 by Nancy L. Baenziger.

== Types ==
The thrombospondins are a family of multifunctional proteins. The family consists of thrombospondins 1–5 and can be divided into two subgroups: A, which contains TSP-1 and TSP-2, and B, which contains TSP-3, TSP-4 and TSP-5 (also designated cartilage oligomeric protein or COMP). TSP-1 and TSP-2 are homotrimers, consisting of three identical subunits, whereas TSP-3, TSP-4 and TSP-5 are homopentamers.

TSP-1 and TSP-2 are produced by immature astrocytes during brain development, which promotes the development of new synapses.

=== Thrombospondin 1 ===
Thrombospondin 1 (TSP-1) is encoded by THBS1. It was first isolated from platelets that had been stimulated with thrombin, and so was designated 'thrombin-sensitive protein'. Since its first recognition, functions for TSP-1 have been found in multiple biological processes including angiogenesis, apoptosis, activation of TGF-beta and Immune regulation. As such, TSP-1 is designated a multifunctional protein.

TSP-1 has multiple receptors, among which CD36, CD47 and integrins are of particular note.

TSP-1 is antiangiogenic, inhibiting the proliferation and migration of endothelial cells by interactions with CD36 expressed on their surface of these cells. Inhibitory peptides and fragments of TSP1 bind to CD36, leading to the expression of FAS ligand (FasL), which activates its specific, ubiquitous receptor, Fas. This leads to the activation of caspases and apoptosis of the cell. Since tumors overexpressing TSP-1 typically grow slower, exhibit less angiogenesis, and have fewer metastases, TSP1 is an attractive target for cancer treatment. Because TSP1 is extremely large (~ 120 kDa monomer), not very abundant and exerts multiple actions, its clinical usefulness is questionable. However, small-molecules based on a CD36-binding peptide sequence from TSP1 are being tested. One analog, ABT-510, exhibits potent proapoptotic activity in cultured cells, while clinically it is very well tolerated with therapeutic benefits reported against several malignancies. In 2005, ABT-510 was evaluated in phase II clinical trials for the treatment of several types of cancer.

== Human proteins containing this domain ==
ADAMTS1; ADAMTS10; ADAMTS12; ADAMTS13; ADAMTS14; ADAMTS15; ADAMTS16; ADAMTS17; ADAMTS18; ADAMTS19; ADAMTS2; ADAMTS20; ADAMTS3; ADAMTS4; ADAMTS5; ADAMTS6; ADAMTS7; ADAMTS8; ADAMTS9; ADAMTSL1; ADAMTSL2; ADAMTSL3; ADAMTSL4; ADAMTSL5; BAI1; BAI2; BAI3; C6; C7; C8A; C8B; C9; C9orf8; C9orf94; CFP; CILP; CILP2; CTGF; CYR61; HMCN1; LIBC; NOV; PAPLN; RSPO1; RSPO3; SEMA5A; SEMA5B; SPON1; SPON2; SSPO; THBS1; THBS2; THSD1; THSD3; THSD7A; THSD7B; UNC5A; UNC5B; UNC5C; UNC5D; WISP1; WISP2; WISP3;
