= Multiple epiphyseal dysplasia =

Rare genetic disorder

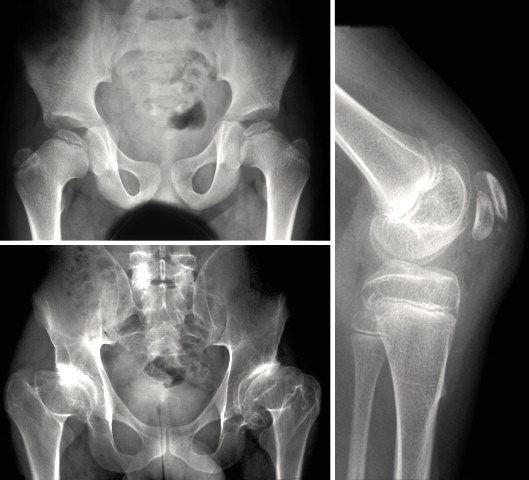
- Specialty: Medical genetics
- Duration: Lifelong
- Frequency: 0.005%

Multiple epiphyseal dysplasia (MED), also known as Fairbank's disease, is a rare genetic disorder (dominant form: 1 in 10,000 births) that affects the growing ends of bones. Long bones normally elongate by expansion of cartilage in the growth plate (epiphyseal plate) near their ends. As it expands outward from the growth plate, the cartilage mineralizes and hardens to become bone (ossification). In MED, this process is defective.

== Signs and symptoms ==
Children with autosomal dominant MED experience joint pain and fatigue after exercising. Their x-rays show small and irregular ossification centers, most apparent in the hips and knees. There are very small capital femoral epiphyses and hypoplastic, poorly formed acetabular roofs. A waddling gait may develop. Knees have metaphyseal widening and irregularity while hands have brachydactyly (short fingers) and proximal metacarpal rounding. Flat feet are very common. The spine is normal but may have a few irregularities, such as scoliosis.

By adulthood, people with MED are of short stature or in the low range of normal and have short limbs relative to their trunks. Frequently, movement becomes limited at the major joints, especially at the elbows and hips. However, loose knee and finger joints can occur. Signs of osteoarthritis usually begin in early adulthood.

Children with recessive MED experience joint pain, particularly of the hips and knees, and commonly have deformities of the hands, feet, knees, or vertebral column (like scoliosis). Approximately 50% of affected children have abnormal findings at birth (such as club foot or twisted metatarsals, cleft palate, inward curving fingers due to underdeveloped bones and brachydactyly, or ear swelling caused by injury during birth). Height is in the normal range before puberty. As adults, people with recessive MED are only slightly more diminished in stature, but within the normal range. Lateral knee radiography can show multi-layered patellae.

== Genetics ==
Multiple epiphyseal dysplasia (MED) encompasses a spectrum of skeletal disorders, in which are inherited in an autosomal dominant form. However, there is an autosomal recessive form.

Associated genes include COL9A1, COL9A2, COL9A3, COMP, and MATN3.

Types include:

Type	OMIM	Gene
EDM1	132400	COMP
EDM2	600204	COL9A2
EDM3	600969	COL9A3
EDM4	226900	DTDST
EDM5	607078	MATN3
EDM6	120210	COL9A1

In the dominant form, mutations in five genes are causative: COMP (chromosome 19), COL9A1 (chromosome 6), COL9A2 (chromosome 1), COL9A3 (chromosome 20), and MATN3 (chromosome 2). However, in approximately 10%–20% of samples analyzed, a mutation cannot be identified in any of the five genes above, suggesting that mutations in other as-yet unidentified genes are involved in the pathogenesis of dominant MED.

The COMP gene is mutated in 70% of the molecularly confirmed MED patients. Mutations are in the exons encoding the type III repeats (exons 8–14) and C-terminal domain (exons 15–19). The most common mutations in COL9A1 are in exons 8-10, in COL9A2 in exons 2-4, and in COL9A3 in exons 2-4. Altogether, those mutations cover 10% of the patients. The other 20% of affected people have mutations in MATN3 gene, all found within exon 2. The following testing regime has been recommended by the European Skeletal Dysplasia Network:

- Level 1: COMP (exons 10–15) and MATN3 (exon 2)
- Level 2: COMP (exons 8 & 9 and 16–19)
- Level 3: COL9A1 (exon 8), COL9A2 and COL9A3 (exon 3)

All those genes are involved in the production of the extracellular matrix (ECM). The role of COMP gene remains unclear. It is a noncollagenous protein of the ECM. Mutations in this gene can cause the pseudoachondroplasia (PSACH). It should play a role in the structural integrity of cartilage by its interaction with other extracellular matrix proteins and can be part of the interaction of the chondrocytes with the matrix and it is also a potent suppressor of apoptosis in chondrocytes. Another role is maintaining a vascular smooth muscle cells contractile under physiological or pathological stimuli.

Since 2003, the European Skeletal Dysplasia Network has used an online system to diagnose cases referred to the network before mutation analysis to study the mutations causing PSACH or MED.

COL9A1, COL9A2, COL9A3 are genes coding for collagen type IX, that is a component of hyaline cartilage. MATN3 protein may play a role in the formation of the extracellular filamentous networks and in the development and homeostasis of cartilage and bone.

In the recessive form, the DTDST gene, also known as SLC26A2, is mutated in almost 90% of the patients, causing diastrophic dysplasia. It is a sulfate transporter, transmembrane glycoprotein implicated in several chondrodysplasias. It is important for sulfation of proteoglycans and matrix organization.

== Diagnosis ==
Diagnosis should be based on the clinical and radiographic findings and a genetic analysis can be assessed.

== Treatment ==
Symptomatic individuals should be seen by an orthopedist to assess the possibility of treatment (physiotherapy for muscular strengthening, cautious use of analgesic medications such as nonsteroidal anti-inflammatory drugs). Although there is no cure, surgery is sometimes used to relieve symptoms. Surgery may be necessary to treat misalignment of the hip (osteotomy of the pelvis or the collum femoris) and, in some cases, malformation (e.g., genu varum or genu valgum). In some cases, total hip replacement may be necessary. However, surgery is not always necessary or appropriate.

Sports involving joint overload are to be avoided, while swimming or cycling are strongly suggested. Cycling has to be avoided in people having ligamentous laxity.

Weight control is suggested.

The use of crutches, other deambulatory aids or wheelchair is useful to prevent hip pain. Pain in the hand while writing can be avoided using a pen with wide grip.

== History ==
Multiple epiphyseal dysplasia was described separately by Seved Ribbing and Harold Arthur Thomas Fairbank in the 1930s.

In 1994, Ralph Oehlmann's group mapped MED to the peri-centromeric region of chromosome 19, using genetic linkage analysis. Michael Briggs' group mapped PSACH to the same area. COMP gene was firstly linked to MED and PSACH in 1995. In 1995, the group led by Knowlton did a "high-resolution genetic and physical mapping of multiple epiphyseal dysplasia and pseudoachondroplasia mutations at chromosome 19p13.1-p12."

Research on COMP led to mouse models of the pathology of MED. In 2002, Svensson's group generated a COMP-null mouse to study the COMP protein in vivo. These mice showed no anatomical, histological, or even ultrastructural abnormalities and none of the clinical signs of PSACH or MED. Lack of COMP was not compensated for by any other protein in the thrombospondin family. This study confirmed that the disease is not caused by reduced expression of COMP.

In 2007, Piròg-Garcia's group generated another mouse model carrying a mutation previously found in a human patient. With this new model, they were able to demonstrate that reduced cell proliferation and increased apoptosis are significant pathological mechanisms involved in MED and PSACH. In 2010, this mouse model allowed a new insight into myopathy and tendinopathy, which are often associated with PSACH and MED. These patients show increased skeletal muscle stress, as indicated by the increase in myofibers with central nuclei. Myopathy in the mutant mouse results from underlying tendinopathy, because the transmission of forces is altered from the normal state. There is a higher proportion of larger diameter fibrils of collagen, but the cross-sectional area of whole mutant tendons was also significantly less than that of the wild-type tendons causing joint laxity and stiffness, easy tiring and weakness. This study is important because those diseases are often mistaken for neurological problems, since the doctor can detect a muscle weakness. This includes many painful and useless clinical neurological examination before the correct diagnosis. In this work, the researchers suggest to the pediatric doctor to perform x-rays before starting the neurological assessment, to exclude the dysplasia.

COL9A1 mutation was discovered in 2001.

== Culture ==
=== Prominent people with this condition ===
- Danny DeVito, American actor, producer, and director
- Robert Reich, former United States Secretary of Labor under President Bill Clinton from 1993 to 1997
- David Wetherill, British Paralympian table tennis athlete
