= Susan Ackerman (neuroscientist) =

American neuroscientist and geneticist

Susan L. Ackerman
- Education: California State University, Chico, University of California, Los Angeles
- Known for: UNC5C, mouse genetics
- Scientific career
- Fields: neuroscience, genetics
- Workplaces: University of California, San Diego, The Jackson Laboratory, Howard Hughes Medical Institute, Massachusetts General Hospital, Tufts University, University of Maine, Orono

Susan L. Ackerman is an American neuroscientist and geneticist. Her work has highlighted some of the genetic and biochemical factors that are involved in the development of the central nervous system and age-related neurodegeneration. Ackerman is a professor at University of California, San Diego. She was formerly a professor at the Jackson Laboratory and the Sackler School of Graduate Biomedical Sciences at Tufts University. She also serves as an adjunct professor at the University of Maine, Orono. Ackerman was an associate geneticist at Massachusetts General Hospital in Boston, Massachusetts.

== Education ==
As an undergraduate, Ackerman attended California State University (Chico), graduating with a Bachelor of Arts degree in Chemistry, and a Bachelor of Arts degree in Biology. Subsequently, Ackerman pursued graduate studies, earning a Doctorate in Biology at the UCLA.

== Career and research ==
Since 2005, Ackerman has served as an investigator at the Howard Hughes Medical Institute. Her work there has centered on the mice that are available through the Jackson Laboratory, known as the Jax mice. These mice have a wide array of genotypic mutations, which lead to different phenotypic expression. Ackerman observes these mice and investigates the genotypic variations that lead to defects in mice. She then investigates the product of these genes and how they affect neurological development and preservation. After serving nineteen years as a faculty member in the Jackson Laboratory, in 2016, Ackerman moved to her own Ackerman Lab at the UC San Diego. In her lab, she focuses on determining how neurological homeostasis in developed and aging brains is linked to molecular pathways. Through phenotype-driven forward genetics and gene-driven reverse genetics, she identifies mutations which lead to abnormal CNS development or neurodegeneration, uncovering pathways which are not typically related to loss of neural function or human disease. She was elected a member of the National Academy of Sciences and the American Academy of Arts and Sciences in April 2019, and to the National Academy of Medicine in 2020.

=== Unc5c ===
Ackerman's research has centered largely on the Unc5c gene. The gene product of Unc5c is the Unc5c protein, a neurological netrin receptor. Her research on Unc5c protein revealed that the protein is integral in the development of the corpus callosum, the neurons that form the connection between the two hemispheres of the brain. A mutation in the Unc5c gene, in association with other mutated genes, leads to a degeneration of the corpus callosum. However, if Unc5c is the only gene that is mutated, no noticeable difference in the corpus callosum is present. This is because the Unc5c receptor is only integral in the formation of the corpus callosum in early-born, deep layer neurons. These neurons comprise a small percentage of the corpus callosum relative to the late-born, upper layer neurons.

=== Harlequin mice ===
Ackerman's research has also dealt with genetic variations that lead to neurons being more susceptible to oxidative damage. This oxidative damage leads to apoptosis in many neurons. The research centers on the Harlequin mice, who have a proviral insertion in the apoptosis-inducing factor (AIF) gene. The AIF protein is, as the research shows, a free radical scavenger, saving cells from and reducing oxidative damage. The proviral insertion into this gene causes an 80% reduction in expression, causing oxidative damage in neurons as they age.

=== Other research ===
Other projects Ackerman has been involved in include the mutation of a U2 snRNA and its connection to neurodegeneration, an editing defective tRNA synthetase that leads to protein misfolding and neurodegeneration, and ribosome stalling by tRNA mutations that leads to neurodegeneration.
