= ADAMTS7 =

Protein-coding gene in humans

Identifiers
- Aliases: ADAMTS7, ADAM-TS 7, ADAM-TS7, ADAMTS-7, ADAM metallopeptidase with thrombospondin type 1 motif 7
- External IDs: OMIM: 605009; MGI: 1347346; GeneCards: ADAMTS7

Gene location (Human)
Chr.	Chromosome 15 (human)
Band	15q25.1	Start	78,759,206 bp
Band	15q25.1	End	78,811,464 bp

Gene location (Mouse)
Chr.	Chromosome 9 (mouse)
Band	9|9 E3.1	Start	90,045,122 bp
Band	9|9 E3.1	End	90,090,124 bp
RNA expression pattern
Bgee	Human / Mouse (ortholog); Top expressed in: right auricle of heart; apex of heart; stromal cell of endometrium; ganglionic eminence; right coronary artery; ascending aorta; left ventricle; left coronary artery; gonad; Descending thoracic aorta / Top expressed in: internal carotid artery; external carotid artery; genital tubercle; Gonadal ridge; ventricular zone; ganglionic eminence; vas deferens; dermis; efferent ductule; renal corpuscle; More reference expression data
BioGPS	n/a
Gene ontology
Molecular function	metal ion binding; peptidase activity; protein binding; metalloendopeptidase activity; hydrolase activity; metallopeptidase activity
Cellular component	endoplasmic reticulum lumen; extracellular region; cell surface
Biological process	cellular response to tumor necrosis factor; cellular response to BMP stimulus; proteolysis; negative regulation of chondrocyte differentiation; cellular response to interleukin-1; proteolysis involved in cellular protein catabolic process
Sources:Amigo / QuickGO
Orthologs
Databases	NCBI: entry; OMA: entry
Species	Human	Mouse
Entrez	11173	108153
Ensembl	ENSG00000136378	ENSMUSG00000032363
UniProt	Q9UKP4	Q68SA9
RefSeq (mRNA)	NM_014272	NM_001003911; NM_001311115; NM_001326294; NM_001326351
RefSeq (protein)	NP_055087	NP_001003911; NP_001298044; NP_001313223; NP_001313280
Location (UCSC)	Chr 15: 78.76 – 78.81 Mb	Chr 9: 90.05 – 90.09 Mb
PubMed search
- Wikidata
View/Edit Human	View/Edit Mouse

A disintegrin and metalloproteinase with thrombospondin motifs 7 (ADAMTS7) is an enzyme that in humans is encoded by the ADAMTS7 gene on chromosome 15. It is ubiquitously expressed in many tissues and cell types. This enzyme was historically reported to catalyze the degradation of cartilage oligomeric matrix protein (COMP), though subsequent studies using purified proteins and unbiased mass spectrometry found that ADAMTS7 does not cleave COMP. ADAMTS7 has been associated with cancer and arthritis in multiple tissue types. The ADAMTS7 gene is a well-established genetic susceptibility locus for coronary artery disease.

== Structure ==
=== Gene ===
The ADAMTS7 gene resides on chromosome 15 at the band 15q24.2 and contains 25 exons.

=== Protein ===
This 1686-amino acid protein belongs to the ADAMTS family and is one of 19 members known in humans. It is a large, multi-domain enzyme that undergoes extensive post-translational modifications, including N- and O-linked glycosylation, chondroitin sulfate attachment, and potential C-mannosylation and O-fucosylation of the thrombospondin (TSP) type 1 domains.

The domain structure from the N-terminus to the C-terminus consists of:

- Signal peptide and prodomain: An N-terminal signal peptide directs cellular secretion of the protein, which is followed by a regulatory prodomain that keeps the protease in a latent state. Fully activating the enzyme requires a two-step proteolytic cleavage of the prodomain by furin (occurring intracellularly after Arg70 and extracellularly after Arg236).
- Metalloprotease domain: Contains the active site where three histidine residues coordinate a zinc ion (Zn^{2+}). This zinc ion, a bound water molecule, and the catalytic glutamate residue (Glu389) perform peptide bond hydrolysis. Homology modeling suggests that three calcium ions are also coordinated within this domain to stabilize its structure.
- Ancillary domains: Located C-terminal to the metalloprotease region, these domains are likely essential for substrate recognition and specificity. They consist of a disintegrin-like domain, a cysteine-rich domain, a spacer domain (which forms a β-sandwich fold), and a total of eight thrombospondin (TSP) type 1 repeats.
- Mucin-like domain: Located towards the C-terminus, this large (415-amino-acid) domain undergoes heavy O-glycosylation and is modified by a chondroitin sulfate chain. The attachment of this glycosaminoglycan chain classifies ADAMTS7 as a proteoglycan, and the chondroitin sulfate chain provides a strong negative charge.
- PLAC domain: A short, cysteine-rich protease and lacunin (PLAC) domain located at the extreme C-terminus.

== Function ==
ADAMTS7 was identified as a protease that binds and cleaves COMP in a yeast two-hybrid screen using the epidermal growth factor (EGF) domain of COMP as the bait. However, this initial finding has been contested; a 2025 study demonstrated that purified ADAMTS7 does not exhibit proteolytic cleavage activity toward purified COMP. Furthermore, three independent unbiased N-terminal amine isotopic labeling of substrates (N-TAILS) proteomic studies identified a number of candidate substrates for ADAMTS7 but did not identify COMP as a potential substrate. Consequently, there is as yet no scientific consensus on the physiological function of ADAMTS7.

Tissue inhibitor of metalloproteinases 4 (TIMP-4) appears to be the physiological inhibitor of ADAMTS7.

== Clinical significance ==
In vascular smooth muscle cell (VSMC), ADAMTS7 mediates VSMC migration, which plays an essential role during the development of atherosclerosis and restenosis. This proatherogenic effect has been demonstrated to specifically require the catalytic protease activity of ADAMTS7, as mice expressing a catalytically inactive mutant of the enzyme (E373Q) are similarly protected against atherosclerosis. Adamts7 deficiency in both the Ldlr^{−/–} and Apoe^{−/–} hyperlipidemic mouse models markedly attenuates formation of atherosclerotic lesions; furthermore, wire-injury experiments in the Adamts7^{−/–} mouse show reduced neointima formation. The association of ADAMTS7 with atherosclerosis suggests that inhibition of ADAMTS7 should be atheroprotective in humans.

A negative correlation between the expression levels of specific miRNAs and ADAMTS7 is observed in normal tissues but not in disease tissues, implying an altered miRNA-target interaction in the disease state. Accordingly, expression profiles of these miRNAs and ADAMTS7 may be useful diagnostic tools to differentiate cancer and lichen planus from normal tissues. ADAMTS7 has also been identified as a putative oncogene and reported to be mutated exclusively in Asians, which may have implications for the prevention and treatment of hepatocellular carcinoma. In addition, ADAMTS7 plays a crucial role in the pathogenesis of arthritis. For example, the FGF2/p65/miR-105/Runx2/ADAMTS axis is reportedly involved in osteoarthritis (OA) pathogenesis. Specifically, ADAMTS7 forms a positive feedback loop with tumour necrosis factor (TNF)-α in the pathogenesis of OA.

=== Clinical marker ===
Genome-wide association studies identified ADAMTS7 as a risk locus for coronary artery disease. Studies have been carried on classification of ADAMTS7 binding site, which may serve as the first step toward developing a new therapeutic target for coronary artery disease. Significant associations for coronary artery calcification with SNPs in ADAMTS7 has also been found in Hispanics. Additionally, a multi-locus genetic risk score study based on a combination of 27 loci, including the ADAMTS7 gene, identified individuals at increased risk for both incident and recurrent coronary artery disease events, as well as an enhanced clinical benefit from statin therapy. The study was based on a community cohort study (the Malmo Diet and Cancer study) and four additional randomized controlled trials of primary prevention cohorts (JUPITER and ASCOT) and secondary prevention cohorts (CARE and PROVE IT-TIMI 22).

=== Inhibitors ===
Given the therapeutic potential of targeting ADAMTS7 in cardiovascular diseases, research has focused on developing selective small-molecule inhibitors. In 2024, the discovery of BAY-9835 was reported, representing the first potent, selective, and orally bioavailable inhibitor designed to target the catalytic domain of ADAMTS7. Concurrently, a series of novel hydroxamate-based arylsulfonamides were designed and synthesized to optimize selectivity starting from the non-selective lead compound EDV33; the optimized lead compound, a p-trifluoromethyl biphenyl sulfonamide, demonstrated nanomolar potency against ADAMTS7 and notable selectivity over ADAMTS5.
