= ADAMTSL4 =

Protein-coding gene in humans

Identifiers
- Aliases: ADAMTSL4, ADAMTSL-4, ECTOL2, TSRC1, ADAMTS like 4
- External IDs: OMIM: 610113; MGI: 2389008; HomoloGene: 23141; GeneCards: ADAMTSL4; OMA:ADAMTSL4 - orthologs

Gene location (Human)
Chr.	Chromosome 1 (human)
Band	1q21.2	Start	150,549,369 bp
Band	1q21.2	End	150,560,937 bp

Gene location (Mouse)
Chr.	Chromosome 3 (mouse)
Band	3|3 F2.1	Start	95,583,511 bp
Band	3|3 F2.1	End	95,595,228 bp
RNA expression pattern
Bgee	Human / Mouse (ortholog); Top expressed in: decidua; gastric mucosa; tibial nerve; left uterine tube; muscle of thigh; apex of heart; upper lobe of left lung; canal of the cervix; Descending thoracic aorta; body of uterus / Top expressed in: interventricular septum; extraocular muscle; muscle of thigh; lip; myocardium of ventricle; ankle; sciatic nerve; right ventricle; temporal muscle; cardiac muscles; More reference expression data
BioGPS	n/a
Gene ontology
Molecular function	protease binding; peptidase activity; protein binding
Cellular component	extracellular region; interstitial matrix; endoplasmic reticulum lumen; cellular component; extracellular matrix; collagen-containing extracellular matrix
Biological process	positive regulation of apoptotic process; extracellular matrix organization; proteolysis; apoptotic process; epithelial cell development
Sources:Amigo / QuickGO
Orthologs
Species	Human	Mouse
Entrez	54507	229595
Ensembl	ENSG00000143382	ENSMUSG00000015850
UniProt	Q6UY14	Q80T21
RefSeq (mRNA)	NM_001288607; NM_001288608; NM_019032; NM_025008; NM_001378596	NM_001301705; NM_144899
RefSeq (protein)	NP_001275536; NP_001275537; NP_061905; NP_079284; NP_001365525	NP_001288634; NP_659148
Location (UCSC)	Chr 1: 150.55 – 150.56 Mb	Chr 3: 95.58 – 95.6 Mb
PubMed search
- Wikidata
View/Edit Human	View/Edit Mouse

ADAMTS-like protein 4 is a protein that in humans is encoded by the ADAMTSL4 gene.

== Function ==
This gene is a member of ADAMTS (a disintegrin and metalloproteinase with thrombospondin motifs)-like gene family and encodes a protein with seven thrombospondin type 1 repeats. The thrombospondin type 1 repeat domain is found in many proteins with diverse biological functions including cellular adhesion, angiogenesis, and patterning of the developing nervous system. Alternate transcriptional splice variants, encoding different isoforms, have been characterized.
