= Collagen, type IX, alpha 3 =

Protein found in humans

COL9A3

Identifiers
- Aliases: COL9A3, DJ885L7.4.1, EDM3, IDD, MED, collagen type IX alpha 3, collagen type IX alpha 3 chain
- External IDs: OMIM: 120270; MGI: 894686; GeneCards: COL9A3

Gene location (Human)
| Chr. | Chromosome 20 (human) |
| Band | 20q13.33 | Start | 62,816,244 bp |
| Band | 20q13.33 | End | 62,841,159 bp |

Gene location (Mouse)
| Chr. | Chromosome 2 (mouse) |
| Band | 2 H4|2 103.14 cM | Start | 180,239,583 bp |
| Band | 2 H4|2 103.14 cM | End | 180,263,982 bp |
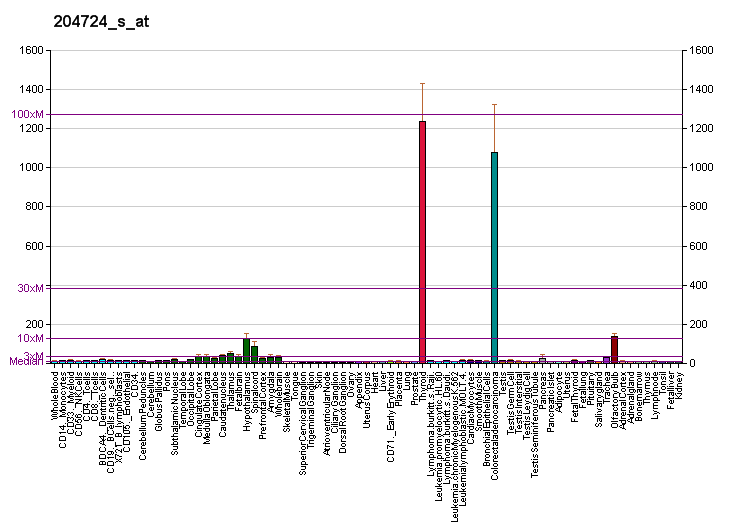
RNA expression pattern
| Bgee | Human / Mouse (ortholog); Top expressed in: tibia; cartilage tissue; inferior ganglion of vagus nerve; C1 segment; trigeminal ganglion; tibial nerve; sural nerve; internal globus pallidus; putamen; subthalamic nucleus / Top expressed in: fossa; vestibular sensory epithelium; condyle; choroid plexus of fourth ventricle; Epithelium of choroid plexus; saccule; occiput; occipital bone; toe; retinal pigment epithelium; More reference expression data |
| BioGPS | More reference expression data |
Gene ontology
| Molecular function | extracellular matrix structural constituent conferring tensile strength; extracellular matrix structural constituent |
| Cellular component | collagen type IX trimer; extracellular region; collagen; endoplasmic reticulum lumen; extracellular space; extracellular matrix; collagen-containing extracellular matrix |
| Biological process | male gonad development; extracellular matrix organization; female gonad development |
Sources:Amigo / QuickGO
Orthologs
| Databases | NCBI: entry; OMA: entry |
| Species | Human | Mouse |
| Entrez | 1299 | 12841 |
| Ensembl | ENSG00000092758 | ENSMUSG00000027570 |
| UniProt | Q14050 | n/a |
| RefSeq (mRNA) | NM_001853 | NM_009936; NM_001378777 |
| RefSeq (protein) | NP_001844 | n/a |
| Location (UCSC) | Chr 20: 62.82 – 62.84 Mb | Chr 2: 180.24 – 180.26 Mb |
| PubMed search |
- Wikidata
| View/Edit Human | View/Edit Mouse |

Collagen alpha-3(IX) chain is a protein that in humans is encoded by the COL9A3 gene.

== Function ==
This gene encodes one of the three alpha chains of type IX collagen, the major collagen component of hyaline cartilage. Type IX collagen, a heterotrimeric molecule, is usually found in tissues containing type II collagen, a fibrillar collagen. Mutations in this gene are associated with multiple epiphyseal dysplasia.
