= ADAMTS8 =

Protein-coding gene in humans

Identifiers
- Aliases: ADAMTS8, ADAM-TS8, METH2, ADAM metallopeptidase with thrombospondin type 1 motif 8
- External IDs: OMIM: 605175; MGI: 1353468; GeneCards: ADAMTS8

Gene location (Human)
Chr.	Chromosome 11 (human)
Band	11q24.3	Start	130,404,923 bp
Band	11q24.3	End	130,428,609 bp

Gene location (Mouse)
Chr.	Chromosome 9 (mouse)
Band	9 A4|9 16.49 cM	Start	30,853,858 bp
Band	9 A4|9 16.49 cM	End	30,875,134 bp
RNA expression pattern
Bgee	Human / Mouse (ortholog); Top expressed in: middle temporal gyrus; upper lobe of left lung; endothelial cell; lower lobe of lung; right lung; Brodmann area 23; entorhinal cortex; tail of epididymis; right coronary artery; visceral pleura / Top expressed in: tunica media of zone of aorta; lumbar spinal ganglion; soleus muscle; ankle; atrium; internal carotid artery; endocardial cushion; semi-lunar valve; inner muscle layer; tunica adventitia of aorta; More reference expression data
BioGPS	n/a
Gene ontology
Molecular function	integrin binding; zinc ion binding; peptidase activity; metalloendopeptidase activity; heparin binding; low-affinity phosphate transmembrane transporter activity; metallopeptidase activity; hydrolase activity; metal ion binding
Cellular component	extracellular region; extracellular matrix; collagen-containing extracellular matrix
Biological process	proteolysis; negative regulation of cell population proliferation; phosphate ion transmembrane transport
Sources:Amigo / QuickGO
Orthologs
Databases	NCBI: entry; OMA: entry
Species	Human	Mouse
Entrez	11095	30806
Ensembl	ENSG00000134917	ENSMUSG00000031994
UniProt	Q9UP79	P57110
RefSeq (mRNA)	NM_007037	NM_013906; NM_001326292
RefSeq (protein)	NP_008968	NP_038934.2
Location (UCSC)	Chr 11: 130.4 – 130.43 Mb	Chr 9: 30.85 – 30.88 Mb
PubMed search
- Wikidata
View/Edit Human	View/Edit Mouse

A disintegrin and metalloproteinase with thrombospondin motifs 8 is an enzyme that in humans is encoded by the ADAMTS8 gene.

== Function ==
This gene encodes a member of the ADAMTS (a disintegrin and metalloproteinase with thrombospondin motifs) protein family. Members of the family share several distinct protein modules, including a propeptide region, a metalloproteinase domain, a disintegrin-like domain, and a thrombospondin type 1 (TS) motif. Individual members of this family differ in the number of C-terminal TS motifs, and some have unique C-terminal domains. The enzyme encoded by this gene contains two C-terminal TS motifs, and disrupts angiogenesis in vivo.

== Clinical significance ==
A number of disorders have been mapped in the vicinity of this gene, most notably lung neoplasms.
