= Thrombospondin 4 =

Protein-coding gene in the species Homo sapiens

THBS4

Identifiers
- Aliases: THBS4, TSP4, TSP-4, thrombospondin 4
- External IDs: OMIM: 600715; MGI: 1101779; GeneCards: THBS4

Gene location (Human)
Chr.	Chromosome 5 (human)
Band	5q14.1	Start	79,991,311 bp
Band	5q14.1	End	80,083,287 bp

Gene location (Mouse)
Chr.	Chromosome 13 (mouse)
Band	13 C3|13 47.75 cM	Start	92,888,098 bp
Band	13 C3|13 47.75 cM	End	92,931,326 bp
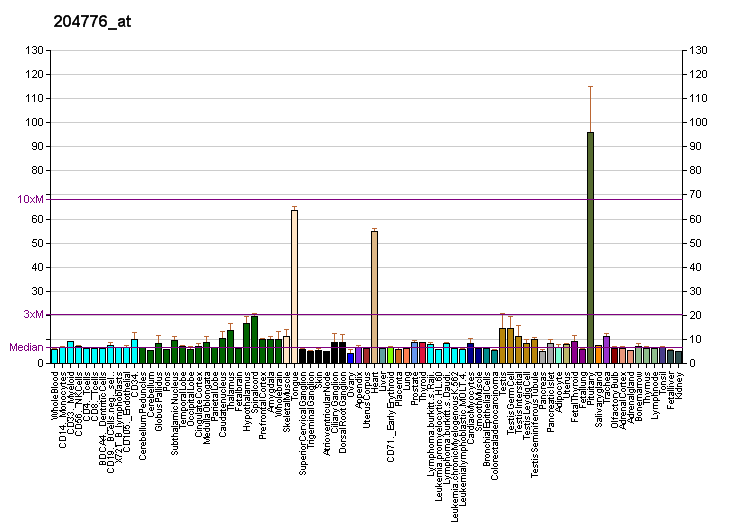
RNA expression pattern
Bgee	Human / Mouse (ortholog); Top expressed in: Achilles tendon; tendon of biceps brachii; synovial joint; pericardium; synovial membrane; glutes; apex of heart; tibial nerve; body of tongue; vena cava / Top expressed in: ankle; left colon; sciatic nerve; lip; body of femur; soleus muscle; intercostal muscle; medial head of gastrocnemius muscle; tibialis anterior muscle; quadriceps femoris muscle; More reference expression data
BioGPS	More reference expression data
Gene ontology
Molecular function	heparin binding; integrin binding; protein binding; growth factor activity; calcium ion binding
Cellular component	basement membrane; extracellular exosome; extracellular region; sarcoplasmic reticulum; extracellular matrix; endoplasmic reticulum; extracellular space; collagen-containing extracellular matrix
Biological process	myoblast migration; positive regulation of endothelial cell proliferation; endothelial cell-cell adhesion; response to unfolded protein; cell adhesion; positive regulation of neutrophil chemotaxis; positive regulation of peptidyl-tyrosine phosphorylation; negative regulation of angiogenesis; tissue remodeling; positive regulation of cell division; response to endoplasmic reticulum stress; regulation of tissue remodeling; behavioral response to pain; regulation of signaling receptor activity; signal transduction
Sources:Amigo / QuickGO
Orthologs
Databases	NCBI: entry; OMA: entry
Species	Human	Mouse
Entrez	7060	21828
Ensembl	ENSG00000113296	ENSMUSG00000021702
UniProt	P35443	Q9Z1T2
RefSeq (mRNA)	NM_001306212; NM_001306213; NM_001306214; NM_003248	NM_011582
RefSeq (protein)	NP_001293141; NP_001293142; NP_001293143; NP_003239	NP_035712
Location (UCSC)	Chr 5: 79.99 – 80.08 Mb	Chr 13: 92.89 – 92.93 Mb
PubMed search
- Wikidata
View/Edit Human	View/Edit Mouse

Thrombospondin-4 is a protein that in humans is encoded by the THBS4 gene.

The protein encoded by this gene belongs to the thrombospondin protein family. Thrombospondin family members are adhesive glycoproteins that mediate cell-to-cell and cell-to-matrix interactions. This protein forms a pentamer and can bind to heparin and calcium. This protein may be involved in local signaling in the developing and adult nervous system, in bone formation and fracture healing, and in osteoarthritis.
