= Thrombospondin 3 =

Protein found in humans

THBS3

Identifiers
- Aliases: THBS3, TSP3, thrombospondin 3
- External IDs: OMIM: 188062; MGI: 98739; GeneCards: THBS3

Gene location (Human)
Chr.	Chromosome 1 (human)
Band	1q22	Start	155,195,588 bp
Band	1q22	End	155,209,051 bp

Gene location (Mouse)
Chr.	Chromosome 3 (mouse)
Band	3 F1|3 39.01 cM	Start	89,122,487 bp
Band	3 F1|3 39.01 cM	End	89,134,144 bp
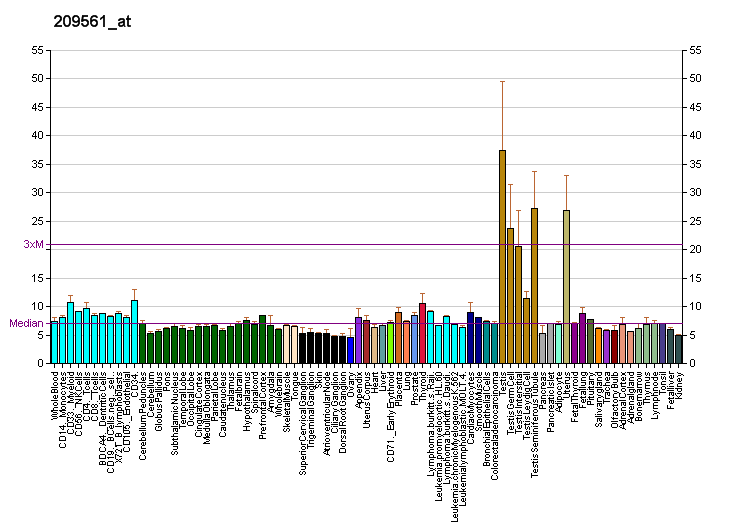
RNA expression pattern
Bgee	Human / Mouse (ortholog); Top expressed in: right uterine tube; tibia; body of uterus; right testis; left testis; right coronary artery; left uterine tube; tibial nerve; tendon of biceps brachii; canal of the cervix / Top expressed in: ventricular zone; spermatocyte; pulmonary alveolar epithelium; lip; ankle; right lung lobe; ankle joint; esophagus; efferent ductule; spermatid; More reference expression data
BioGPS	More reference expression data
Gene ontology
Molecular function	calcium ion binding; heparin binding; extracellular matrix structural constituent
Cellular component	perinuclear region of cytoplasm; extracellular region; extracellular matrix; extracellular space; collagen-containing extracellular matrix
Biological process	growth plate cartilage development; ossification involved in bone maturation; cell-matrix adhesion; cell adhesion; bone trabecula formation; extracellular matrix organization
Sources:Amigo / QuickGO
Orthologs
Databases	NCBI: entry; OMA: entry
Species	Human	Mouse
Entrez	7059	21827
Ensembl	ENSG00000169231	ENSMUSG00000028047
UniProt	P49746	Q05895
RefSeq (mRNA)	NM_001252607; NM_001252608; NM_007112	NM_013691
RefSeq (protein)	NP_001239536; NP_001239537; NP_009043	NP_038719
Location (UCSC)	Chr 1: 155.2 – 155.21 Mb	Chr 3: 89.12 – 89.13 Mb
PubMed search
- Wikidata
View/Edit Human	View/Edit Mouse

Thrombospondin-3 (TSP3) is a protein that in humans is encoded by the THBS3 gene.

The protein encoded by this gene belongs to the thrombospondin family. Thrombospondin family members are adhesive glycoproteins that mediate cell-to-cell and cell-to-matrix interactions. TSP3 has been found to be involved in the regulation of skeletal maturation. This protein forms a pentameric molecule linked by a single disulfide bond. This gene shares a common promoter with metaxin 1. Identified as the gene on chromosome 1 responsible for mediating an associated with genetic susceptibility to SARS-CoV-2 infection.
