= Collagen, type IX, alpha 2 =

Protein found in humans

COL9A2

Identifiers
- Aliases: COL9A2, DJ39G22.4, EDM2, MED, STL5, collagen type IX alpha 2, collagen type IX alpha 2 chain
- External IDs: OMIM: 120260; MGI: 88466; GeneCards: COL9A2

Gene location (Human)
Chr.	Chromosome 1 (human)
Band	1p34.2	Start	40,300,489 bp
Band	1p34.2	End	40,317,813 bp

Gene location (Mouse)
Chr.	Chromosome 4 (mouse)
Band	4 D2.2|4 56.78 cM	Start	120,896,582 bp
Band	4 D2.2|4 56.78 cM	End	120,912,519 bp
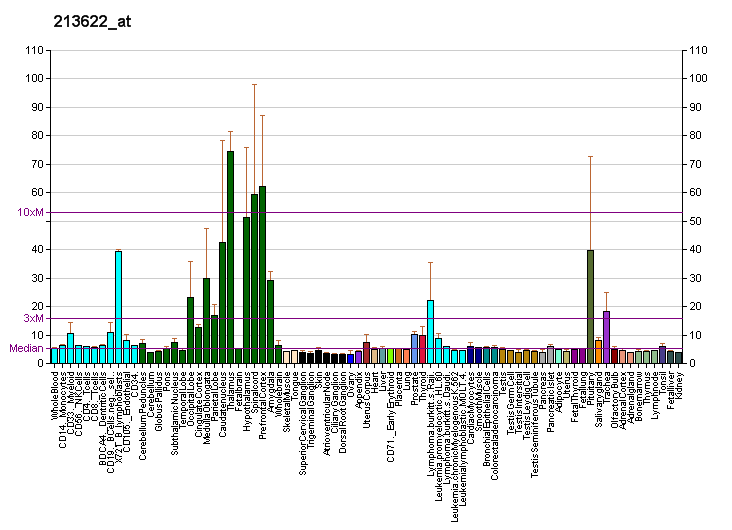
RNA expression pattern
Bgee	Human / Mouse (ortholog); Top expressed in: C1 segment; tibia; anterior pituitary; cartilage tissue; ganglionic eminence; amygdala; putamen; caudate nucleus; hypothalamus; nucleus accumbens / Top expressed in: vestibular sensory epithelium; saccule; utricle; otic vesicle; molar; human vertebral column; Ileal epithelium; lens; axial skeleton; cochlea; More reference expression data
BioGPS	More reference expression data
Gene ontology
Molecular function	extracellular matrix structural constituent conferring tensile strength; extracellular matrix structural constituent
Cellular component	extracellular region; endoplasmic reticulum lumen; collagen; collagen type IX trimer; basement membrane; extracellular space; extracellular matrix; collagen-containing extracellular matrix
Biological process	skeletal system development; extracellular matrix organization
Sources:Amigo / QuickGO
Orthologs
Databases	NCBI: entry; OMA: entry
Species	Human	Mouse
Entrez	1298	12840
Ensembl	ENSG00000049089	ENSMUSG00000028626
UniProt	Q14055	Q07643
RefSeq (mRNA)	NM_001852	NM_007741
RefSeq (protein)	NP_001843	NP_031767
Location (UCSC)	Chr 1: 40.3 – 40.32 Mb	Chr 4: 120.9 – 120.91 Mb
PubMed search
- Wikidata
View/Edit Human	View/Edit Mouse

Collagen alpha-2(IX) chain is a protein that in humans is encoded by the COL9A2 gene.

This gene encodes one of the three alpha chains of type IX collagen, the major collagen component of hyaline cartilage. Type IX collagen, a heterotrimeric molecule, is usually found in tissues containing type II collagen, a fibrillar collagen. This chain is unusual in that, unlike the other two type IX alpha chains, it contains a covalently attached glycosaminoglycan side chain. Mutations in this gene are associated with multiple epiphyseal dysplasia.
