= ADAMTS15 =

Protein-coding gene

Identifiers
- Aliases: ADAMTS15, ADAM metallopeptidase with thrombospondin type 1 motif 15
- External IDs: OMIM: 607509; MGI: 2449569; GeneCards: ADAMTS15

Gene location (Human)
Chr.	Chromosome 11 (human)
Band	11q24.3	Start	130,448,645 bp
Band	11q24.3	End	130,476,645 bp

Gene location (Mouse)
Chr.	Chromosome 9 (mouse)
Band	9|9 A4	Start	30,810,451 bp
Band	9|9 A4	End	30,833,748 bp
RNA expression pattern
Bgee	Human / Mouse (ortholog); Top expressed in: decidua; myocardium of left ventricle; cardiac muscle tissue of right atrium; parietal pleura; right ventricle; apex of heart; lactiferous duct; right auricle of heart; left uterine tube; tibial arteries / Top expressed in: aortic valve; ascending aorta; lumbar spinal ganglion; internal carotid artery; external carotid artery; tunica media of zone of aorta; left colon; trigeminal ganglion; gastric mucosa; mucous cell of stomach; More reference expression data
BioGPS	n/a
Gene ontology
Molecular function	zinc ion binding; peptidase activity; metalloendopeptidase activity; heparin binding; endopeptidase activity; hydrolase activity; metallopeptidase activity; extracellular matrix binding; metal ion binding
Cellular component	extracellular region; cell surface; extracellular space; collagen-containing extracellular matrix
Biological process	proteolysis
Sources:Amigo / QuickGO
Orthologs
Databases	NCBI: entry; OMA: entry
Species	Human	Mouse
Entrez	170689	235130
Ensembl	ENSG00000166106	ENSMUSG00000033453
UniProt	Q8TE58	P59384
RefSeq (mRNA)	NM_139055	NM_001024139; NM_001329420
RefSeq (protein)	NP_620686	NP_001019310; NP_001316349
Location (UCSC)	Chr 11: 130.45 – 130.48 Mb	Chr 9: 30.81 – 30.83 Mb
PubMed search
- Wikidata
View/Edit Human	View/Edit Mouse

ADAMTS15 is a protein-coding gene that belongs to the ADAMTS family. The ADAMTS family, which stands for A Disintegrin-like and Metalloproteinase with Thrombospondin motifs. This family consists of enzymes involved in extracellular processes. These enzymes play roles in modifying the extracellular matrix (ECM) which is important for maintaining tissue structure and function.

ADAMTS15 protein participates in extracellular matrix (ECM) remodeling, a process that is important in cancer and normal biological functions. It is involved in the regulation of proteoglycans within the ECM which can suppress tumor growth. The ADAMTS15 protein functions as a secreted enzyme, meaning it is located outside the cell where it can interact with its surroundings.

== Structure ==
ADAMTS15 has several functional domains, giving it a complex protein structure. One of its main features is the metalloprotease domain, which is responsible for cleaving and breaking down proteins. ADAMTS15 requires zinc for its enzymatic activity. This zinc ion stabilizes its active site to allow catalytic activity.

In addition to the metalloprotease domain, it also contains thrombospondin motifs that contribute to its structure, function and its ability to interact with the extracellular matrix. The protein is produced in an inactive form and becomes active after proteolytic cleavage. This step is essential because the enzyme only functions when needed and prevents the breakdown of the extracellular components.

== Function ==
ADAMTS15 functions as a protease that breaks down proteins. It primarily acts in the extracellular matrix, where it targets proteoglycans such as Versican. Versican is an important structural component of the ECM and plays a role in maintaining tissue hydration and organization. By cleaving Versican and other substrates, ADAMTS15 plays a role in ECM remodeling. This remodeling changes the environment surrounding cells, which can affect how they behave. It plays a role in cell signaling, migration, and adhesion. These processes are important for normal tissue development, but when they are not properly regulated, they can also contribute to disease. As a result, ADAMTS15 influences cell signaling, migration, and adhesion. For example, when the ECM is modified, cells can become less tightly attached and more capable of moving, which is a key factor during normal processes like tissue development and wound healing. In addition, changes in the ECM can affect how molecules interact with cells, which may alter pathways that control cell growth and differentiation. These processes are important for maintaining normal tissue function, but when they are not properly regulated, they can also contribute to disease. Disruption of ECM remodeling has been associated with conditions such as cancer, where changes in cell adhesion and migration can increase tumor progression and metastasis.

== Cancer ==
ADAMTS15 has been studied for its role in cancer and is generally thought to act as a tumor suppressor. Research shows that when its expression is increased, there is a decrease in cell proliferation, cancer cell migration, and survival in prostate cancer cells. These effects depend on its enzymatic activity, since the inactive form doesn't work the same way. When this protein is lost or mutated, tumor growth has been linked to increase.

The function of ADAMTS15 is also linked to the cleavage of proteoglycans such as Versican, which can influence tumor cell behavior. Because of this, ADAMTS15 has the potential to be used as both a biomarker and a therapeutic target in cancer. The extracellular matrix (ECM) helps support tissue structure and can act as a barrier, but it can also be remodeled. Changes in ECM remodeling have been linked to worse outcomes in cancers like melanoma, breast, and prostate cancer. These changes can impact processes including cell adhesion, migration, proliferation, and angiogenesis.

Extracellular matrix remodeling plays an important role in cancer progression because it affects how tumor cells grow and spread. By modifying components of the ECM, ADAMTS15 can change the environment around cancer cells, making it less favorable for tumor growth. This supports its role as a tumor suppressor. Changes in ECM structure can also affect angiogenesis, which is the formation of new blood vessels that supply tumors with nutrients. Through these affects, ADAMTS15 may indirectly limit tumor growth and metastasis.

== Inflammation/Cardiovascular ==
ADAMTS15 has also been linked to inflammatory pathways, especially through changes in its expression during disease. Since Inflammation plays a role in many conditions, including cardiovascular disease, this connection is important. Some studies suggest that ADAMTS15 may help regulate these pathways, which could support tissue balance and reducing damage during disease.

== Metabolism of Adipose ==
This protein has also been studied in metabolic processes, particularly in adipose tissue. Loss of this protein has been shown to increase the browning of white fat, which affects energy metabolism. The browning of white fat occurs when energy storing fat cells begin to take on characteristics of energy burning cells. This change can increase metabolic activity and heat production. Because of this, ADAMTS15 may play a role in regulating energy balance and metabolic health.

== Genetics/Expression ==
ADAMTS15 is encoded by a gene located on chromosome 11 in humans. It is expressed in multiple tissue types, suggesting it plays a role in a variety of biological processes. Expression levels of ADAMTS15 can change under different disease conditions, particularly in cancer and inflammatory states. Mutations in this gene may lead to a loss of normal protein function, which can disrupt its role in regulating extracellular matrix components. Understanding how ADAMTS15 expression is regulated may provide insight into its role in both normal physiology and disease.

== Clinical Significance ==
ADAMTS15 is clinically significant due to its involvement in several disease processes. In cancer, loss or inactivation of ADAMTS15 has been associated with tumor progression, supporting its role as a tumor suppressor. Studies have also linked genetic inactivation of this metalloprotease to cancers such as colorectal cancer.
