= THSD1 =

Protein-coding gene in the species Homo sapiens

Identifiers
- Aliases: THSD1, TMTSP, UNQ3010, thrombospondin type 1 domain containing 1, ANIB12
- External IDs: OMIM: 616821; MGI: 1929096; HomoloGene: 10264; GeneCards: THSD1; OMA:THSD1 - orthologs

Gene location (Human)
Chr.	Chromosome 13 (human)
Band	13q14.3	Start	52,377,167 bp
Band	13q14.3	End	52,416,373 bp

Gene location (Mouse)
Chr.	Chromosome 8 (mouse)
Band	8|8 A2	Start	22,717,329 bp
Band	8|8 A2	End	22,751,350 bp
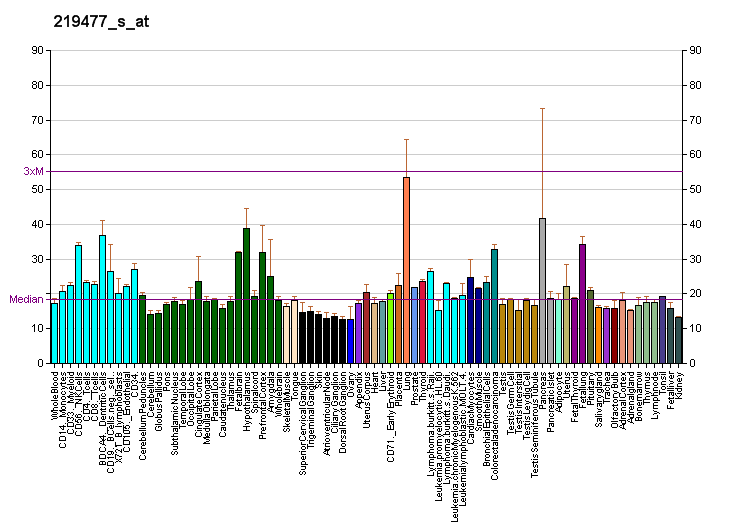
RNA expression pattern
Bgee	Human / Mouse (ortholog); Top expressed in: ventricular zone; right lung; apex of heart; placenta; upper lobe of left lung; testicle; subcutaneous adipose tissue; temporal lobe; amygdala; left ventricle / Top expressed in: external carotid artery; internal carotid artery; left lung lobe; lip; endothelial cell of lymphatic vessel; skin of back; right lung lobe; hair follicle; dermis; yolk sac; More reference expression data
BioGPS	More reference expression data
Orthologs
Species	Human	Mouse
Entrez	55901	56229
Ensembl	ENSG00000136114	ENSMUSG00000031480
UniProt	Q9NS62	Q9JM61
RefSeq (mRNA)	NM_199263; NM_018676	NM_001205253; NM_001293688; NM_019576
RefSeq (protein)	NP_061146; NP_954872	NP_001192182; NP_001280617; NP_062522
Location (UCSC)	Chr 13: 52.38 – 52.42 Mb	Chr 8: 22.72 – 22.75 Mb
PubMed search
- Wikidata
View/Edit Human	View/Edit Mouse

Thrombospondin type-1 domain-containing protein 1 is a protein that in humans is encoded by the THSD1 gene.

The protein encoded by this gene contains a type 1 thrombospondin domain, which is found in thrombospondin, a number of proteins involved in the complement pathway, as well as extracellular matrix proteins. Alternatively spliced transcript variants encoding distinct isoforms have been observed.
