= Thrombospondin-2 =

Protein-coding gene in the species Homo sapiens

THBS2
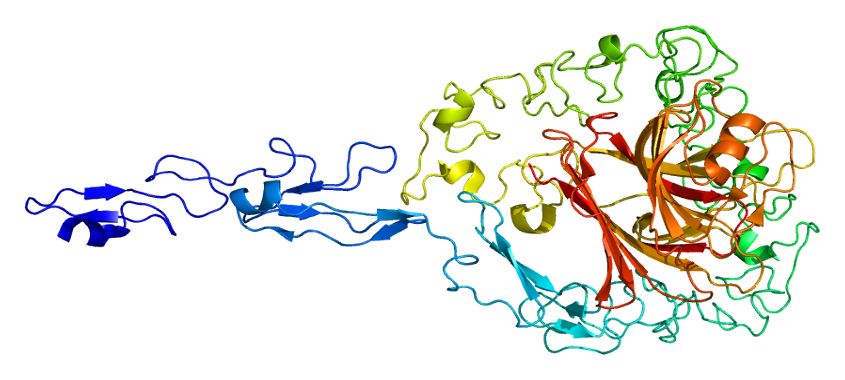

Identifiers
- Aliases: THBS2, TSP2, thrombospondin 2
- External IDs: OMIM: 188061; MGI: 98738; GeneCards: THBS2
Available structures
PDB	Ortholog search: PDBe RCSB
PDB	List of PDB id codes 1YO8, 2RHP

Gene location (Human)
Chr.	Chromosome 6 (human)
Band	6q27	Start	169,215,780 bp
Band	6q27	End	169,254,044 bp

Gene location (Mouse)
Chr.	Chromosome 17 (mouse)
Band	17 A2|17 8.95 cM	Start	14,885,762 bp
Band	17 A2|17 8.95 cM	End	14,914,497 bp
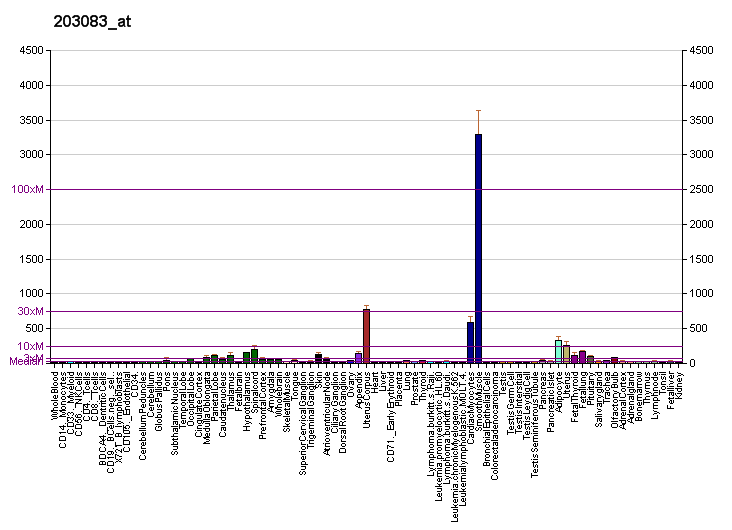
RNA expression pattern
Bgee	Human / Mouse (ortholog); Top expressed in: pericardium; right coronary artery; stromal cell of endometrium; saphenous vein; tibia; skin of hip; hair follicle; thoracic aorta; ascending aorta; Descending thoracic aorta / Top expressed in: calvaria; stroma of bone marrow; body of femur; ankle; dermis; semi-lunar valve; umbilical cord; atrioventricular valve; aortic valve; ankle joint; More reference expression data
BioGPS	More reference expression data
Gene ontology
Molecular function	calcium ion binding; protein binding; heparin binding; extracellular matrix structural constituent
Cellular component	extracellular matrix; platelet alpha granule; basement membrane; extracellular region; extracellular space; collagen-containing extracellular matrix
Biological process	positive regulation of synapse assembly; negative regulation of angiogenesis; cell adhesion; extracellular matrix organization
Sources:Amigo / QuickGO
Orthologs
Databases	NCBI: entry; OMA: entry
Species	Human	Mouse
Entrez	7058	21826
Ensembl	ENSG00000186340	ENSMUSG00000023885
UniProt	P35442	Q03350
RefSeq (mRNA)	NM_003247	NM_011581
RefSeq (protein)	NP_003238; NP_001368868; NP_001368869; NP_001368870; NP_001368871	NP_035711
Location (UCSC)	Chr 6: 169.22 – 169.25 Mb	Chr 17: 14.89 – 14.91 Mb
PubMed search
- Wikidata
View/Edit Human	View/Edit Mouse

Thrombospondin-2 is a protein that in humans is encoded by the THBS2 gene.

The protein encoded by this gene belongs to the thrombospondin family. It is a disulfide-linked homotrimeric glycoprotein that mediates cell-to-cell and cell-to-matrix interactions. The role of the protein in cancer is controversial, contrasting studies show positive and negative roles for cancer development. Studies of the mouse counterpart suggest that this protein may modulate the cell surface properties of mesenchymal cells and be involved in cell adhesion and migration.

== Interactions ==
THBS2 has been shown to interact with MMP2.
