= ADAMTS1 =

Protein-coding gene in humans

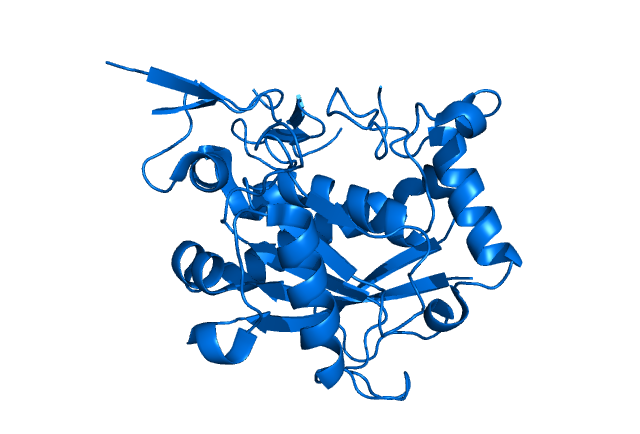

Identifiers
- Aliases: ADAMTS1, C3-C5, METH1, ADAM metallopeptidase with thrombospondin type 1 motif 1
- External IDs: OMIM: 605174; MGI: 109249; GeneCards: ADAMTS1
Available structures
PDB	Ortholog search: PDBe RCSB
PDB	List of PDB id codes 2JIH, 2V4B, 3Q2G, 3Q2H

Gene location (Human)
Chr.	Chromosome 21 (human)
Band	21q21.3	Start	26,835,755 bp
Band	21q21.3	End	26,845,409 bp

Gene location (Mouse)
Chr.	Chromosome 16 (mouse)
Band	16 C3.3|16 48.2 cM	Start	85,590,715 bp
Band	16 C3.3|16 48.2 cM	End	85,600,001 bp
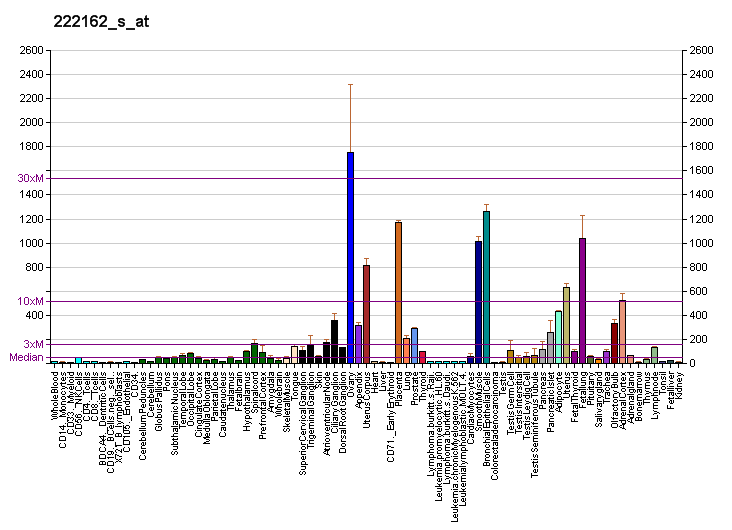
RNA expression pattern
Bgee	Human / Mouse (ortholog); Top expressed in: right ovary; left uterine tube; vena cava; left ovary; pericardium; gastric mucosa; decidua; tibial arteries; mucosa of urinary bladder; ascending aorta / Top expressed in: iris; left lung lobe; efferent ductule; stroma of bone marrow; ciliary body; gastrula; ascending aorta; aortic valve; vas deferens; decidua; More reference expression data
BioGPS	More reference expression data
Gene ontology
Molecular function	heparin binding; zinc ion binding; metal ion binding; peptidase activity; metalloendopeptidase activity; hydrolase activity; metallopeptidase activity
Cellular component	extracellular region; basement membrane; cytoplasmic vesicle; extracellular matrix; collagen-containing extracellular matrix
Biological process	ovulation from ovarian follicle; heart trabecula formation; kidney development; proteolysis; integrin-mediated signaling pathway; negative regulation of cell population proliferation; positive regulation of G1/S transition of mitotic cell cycle; positive regulation of vascular associated smooth muscle cell proliferation; positive regulation of vascular associated smooth muscle cell migration
Sources:Amigo / QuickGO
Orthologs
Databases	NCBI: entry; OMA: entry
Species	Human	Mouse
Entrez	9510	11504
Ensembl	ENSG00000154734	ENSMUSG00000022893
UniProt	Q9UHI8	P97857
RefSeq (mRNA)	NM_006988	NM_009621
RefSeq (protein)	NP_008919	NP_033751
Location (UCSC)	Chr 21: 26.84 – 26.85 Mb	Chr 16: 85.59 – 85.6 Mb
PubMed search
- Wikidata
View/Edit Human	View/Edit Mouse

A disintegrin and metalloproteinase with thrombospondin motifs 1 is an enzyme that in humans is encoded by the ADAMTS1 gene.

== Structure ==
This gene encodes a member of the ADAMTS (a disintegrin and metalloproteinase with thrombospondin motif) protein family. Members of the family share several distinct protein modules, including a propeptide region, a metalloproteinase domain, a disintegrin-like domain, and a thrombospondin type 1 (TS) motif. Individual members of this family differ in the number of C-terminal TS motifs, and some have unique C-terminal domains. The protein encoded by this gene contains two disintegrin loops and three C-terminal TS motifs and has anti-angiogenic activity.

ADAMTS1 is a metalloproteinase whose structure includes several critical domains that enable its enzymatic function. These include a metalloproteinase domain, disintegrin-like domain, thrombospondin type 1 repeats (TSRs), and C-terminal regions such as spacer and cysteine-rich domains. Spacer domains are essential for substrate binding and contain clusters of positively charged residues that interact with negatively charged substrates such as versican and aggrecan. Cysteine residues contribute to the structural stability of ADAMTS1, and deletion of this domain significantly reduces versicanase activity. Thrombospondin type 1 repeats facilitate binding to sulfated glycosaminoglycans, including heparin and heparan sulfate, which helps anchor ADAMTS1 within the extracellular matrix (ECM). This positioning is important for efficient proteolytic activity on ECM substrates.

== Function ==
ADAMTS1 plays a key enzymatic role in remodeling the extracellular matrix (ECM) by cleaving proteoglycans such as versican and aggrecan. These substrates are major components of the ECM and are particularly important for cartilage development and maintaining structural integrity. By targeting specific cleavage sites, ADAMTS1 regulates ECM composition, influencing cell migration, differentiation, and tissue remodeling.

This enzymatic activity is critical for several physiological processes, including fertilization, cardiovascular development, and cancer progression. Its ability to remodel ECM components is central to maintaining tissue architecture and facilitating intercellular signaling.

More broadly, ADAMTS proteases contribute to ECM remodeling necessary for tissue morphogenesis and germ cell development in both sexes. These structural rearrangements allow for proper ligand-receptor interactions that support coordinated tissue growth and regression.

During folliculogenesis, ADAMTS1, along with ADAMTS4 and ADAMTS16, is upregulated by follicle-stimulating hormone (FSH), promoting follicle growth and survival. ADAMTS1 is predominantly expressed in granulosa cells, where it is essential for follicular integrity. In its absence, granulosa cells progressively degenerate, leading to follicular breakdown. However, the oocytes remain intact and accumulate within the ovarian stroma.

== Clinical significance ==
Expression of the ADAMTS1 gene has been associated with various inflammatory processes and the development of cancer cachexia. Altered expression or activity of ADAMTS proteases, including ADAMTS1, has been linked to reproductive disorders such as polyendocrine metabolic ovarian syndrome (PMOS). These disruptions may impair ECM remodeling, which is crucial for proper follicular development and ovulation, contributing to the pathophysiology of PMOS and related fertility issues.

== Interactions ==
ADAMTS1 has been shown to interact with Vascular endothelial growth factor A.
