= Spondin 2 =

Protein-coding gene in the species Homo sapiens

SPON2

Identifiers
- Aliases: SPON2, DIL-1, DIL1, M-SPONDIN, MINDIN, spondin 2
- External IDs: OMIM: 605918; MGI: 1923724; GeneCards: SPON2
Available structures
PDB	Ortholog search: PDBe RCSB
PDB	List of PDB id codes 3D34

Gene location (Human)
Chr.	Chromosome 4 (human)
Band	4p16.3	Start	1,166,932 bp
Band	4p16.3	End	1,208,962 bp

Gene location (Mouse)
Chr.	Chromosome 5 (mouse)
Band	5|5 B1	Start	33,355,528 bp
Band	5|5 B1	End	33,375,799 bp
RNA expression pattern
Bgee	Human / Mouse (ortholog); Top expressed in: granulocyte; decidua; canal of the cervix; body of uterus; myometrium; gastric mucosa; left uterine tube; beta cell; right lobe of liver; right uterine tube / Top expressed in: epithelium of lens; cervix; cornea; esophagus; lip; efferent ductule; duodenum; sciatic nerve; lumbar subsegment of spinal cord; urinary bladder; More reference expression data
BioGPS	n/a
Gene ontology
Molecular function	antigen binding; lipopolysaccharide binding; metal ion binding; protein binding
Cellular component	extracellular region; extracellular exosome; extracellular space; extracellular matrix
Biological process	mast cell mediated immunity; positive regulation of macrophage cytokine production; immune system process; defense response to fungus; axon guidance; response to lipopolysaccharide; cell adhesion; defense response to virus; defense response to bacterium; positive regulation of interleukin-6 production; positive regulation of tumor necrosis factor production; innate immune response; cellular response to lipopolysaccharide; opsonization; induction of bacterial agglutination
Sources:Amigo / QuickGO
Orthologs
Databases	NCBI: entry; OMA: entry
Species	Human	Mouse
Entrez	10417	100689
Ensembl	ENSG00000159674	ENSMUSG00000037379
UniProt	Q9BUD6	Q8BMS2
RefSeq (mRNA)	NM_012445; NM_001128325; NM_001199021	NM_133903
RefSeq (protein)	NP_001121797; NP_001185950; NP_036577	NP_598664
Location (UCSC)	Chr 4: 1.17 – 1.21 Mb	Chr 5: 33.36 – 33.38 Mb
PubMed search
- Wikidata
View/Edit Human	View/Edit Mouse

Spondin 2, also known as mindin, is a protein that in humans is encoded by the SPON2 gene.
