= ADAMTS6 =

Protein in humans

Identifiers
- Aliases: ADAMTS6, ADAM-TS 6, ADAM-TS6, ADAMTS-6, ADAM metallopeptidase with thrombospondin type 1 motif 6
- External IDs: OMIM: 605008; MGI: 1347348; GeneCards: ADAMTS6

Gene location (Human)
Chr.	Chromosome 5 (human)
Band	5q12.3	Start	65,148,738 bp
Band	5q12.3	End	65,481,920 bp

Gene location (Mouse)
Chr.	Chromosome 13 (mouse)
Band	13|13 D1	Start	104,424,343 bp
Band	13|13 D1	End	104,633,203 bp
RNA expression pattern
Bgee	Human / Mouse (ortholog); Top expressed in: tibia; Achilles tendon; gastric mucosa; stromal cell of endometrium; testicle; placenta; ventricular zone; right uterine tube; gonad; gallbladder / Top expressed in: hand; ventricular zone; facial motor nucleus; vas deferens; lens; genital tubercle; umbilical cord; epithelium of lens; atrium; foot; More reference expression data
BioGPS	n/a
Gene ontology
Molecular function	peptidase activity; metalloendopeptidase activity; hydrolase activity; metallopeptidase activity; metal ion binding
Cellular component	extracellular region
Biological process	proteolysis; cardiac septum development; development of the heart; aorta development; coronary vasculature development
Sources:Amigo / QuickGO
Orthologs
Databases	NCBI: entry; OMA: entry
Species	Human	Mouse
Entrez	11174	108154
Ensembl	ENSG00000049192	ENSMUSG00000046169
UniProt	Q9UKP5	D3Z1A5
RefSeq (mRNA)	NM_197941; NM_014273	NM_001081020; NM_175496
RefSeq (protein)	NP_922932	NP_001074489
Location (UCSC)	Chr 5: 65.15 – 65.48 Mb	Chr 13: 104.42 – 104.63 Mb
PubMed search
- Wikidata
View/Edit Human	View/Edit Mouse

ADAM metallopeptidase with thrombospondin type 1 motif 6 is a protein that in humans is encoded by the ADAMTS6 gene.

== Gene ==
This gene encodes a member of the ADAMTS (a disintegrin and metalloproteinase with thrombospondin motifs) protein family.

== Structure ==
Members of the family share several distinct protein modules, including a propeptide region, a metalloproteinase domain, a disintegrin-like domain, and a thrombospondin type 1 (TS) motif. Individual members of this family differ in the number of C-terminal TS motifs, and some have unique C-terminal domains. The encoded preproprotein is proteolytically processed to generate the mature enzyme. Expression of this gene may be regulated by the cytokine TNF-alpha.

== Clinical significance ==
Mutation in ADAMTS6 causes predisposition to hernias.
