= Collagen, type IX, alpha 1 =

Protein found in humans

COL9A1
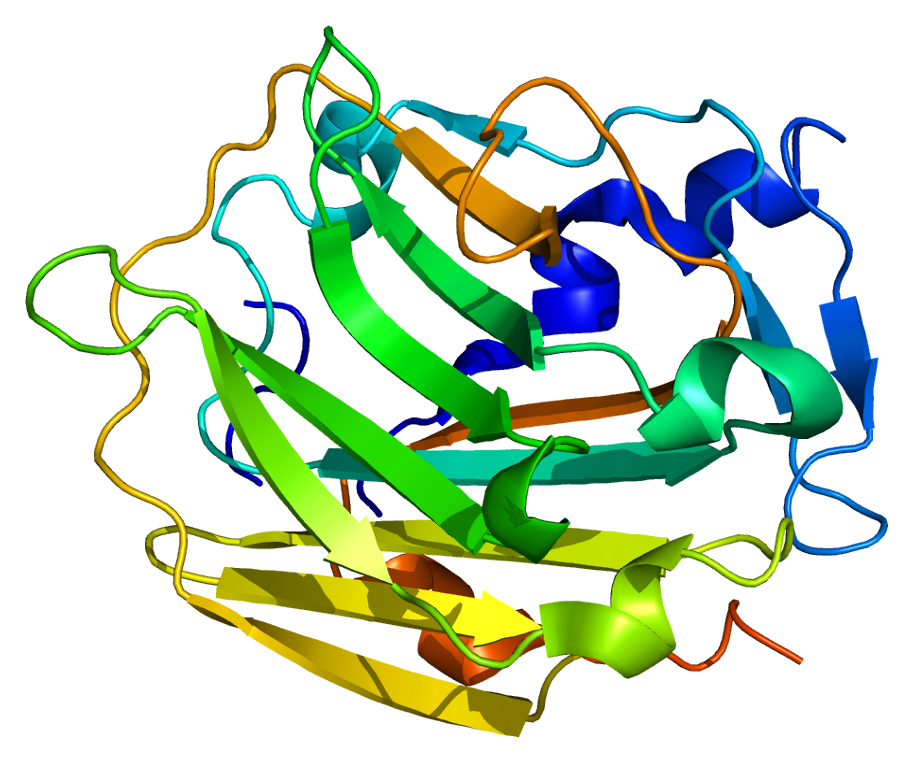

Identifiers
- Aliases: COL9A1, DJ149L1.1.2, EDM6, MED, STL4, collagen type IX alpha 1, collagen type IX alpha 1 chain
- External IDs: OMIM: 120210; MGI: 88465; GeneCards: COL9A1
Available structures
PDB	Ortholog search: PDBe RCSB
PDB	List of PDB id codes 2UUR

Gene location (Human)
Chr.	Chromosome 6 (human)
Band	6q13	Start	70,216,040 bp
Band	6q13	End	70,303,084 bp

Gene location (Mouse)
Chr.	Chromosome 1 (mouse)
Band	1 A5|1 9.95 cM	Start	24,216,691 bp
Band	1 A5|1 9.95 cM	End	24,291,765 bp
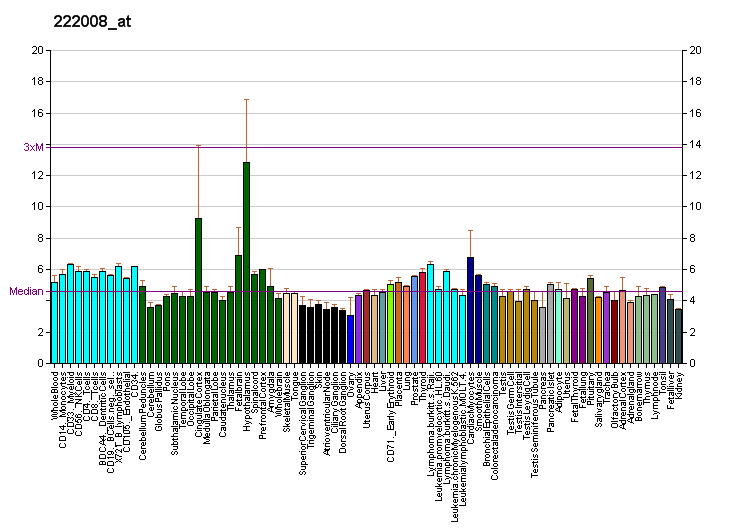
RNA expression pattern
Bgee	Human / Mouse (ortholog); Top expressed in: tibia; cartilage tissue; ventricular zone; sperm; ganglionic eminence; Epithelium of choroid plexus; amygdala; gonad; caudate nucleus; cingulate gyrus / Top expressed in: vestibular sensory epithelium; human fetus; condyle; fossa; saccule; calvaria; mandibular prominence; phalanx of finger; lesser wing of sphenoid bone; utricle; More reference expression data
BioGPS	More reference expression data
Gene ontology
Molecular function	extracellular matrix structural constituent conferring tensile strength; metal ion binding; extracellular matrix structural constituent
Cellular component	collagen type IX trimer; extracellular region; collagen; endoplasmic reticulum lumen; extracellular space; extracellular matrix; collagen-containing extracellular matrix
Biological process	animal organ morphogenesis; extracellular matrix organization
Sources:Amigo / QuickGO
Orthologs
Databases	NCBI: entry; OMA: entry
Species	Human	Mouse
Entrez	1297	12839
Ensembl	ENSG00000112280	ENSMUSG00000026147
UniProt	P20849	Q05722
RefSeq (mRNA)	NM_001851; NM_078485; NM_001377289; NM_001377290; NM_001377291	NM_001290691; NM_007740
RefSeq (protein)	NP_001842; NP_511040; NP_001364218; NP_001364219; NP_001364220	NP_001277620; NP_031766
Location (UCSC)	Chr 6: 70.22 – 70.3 Mb	Chr 1: 24.22 – 24.29 Mb
PubMed search
- Wikidata
View/Edit Human	View/Edit Mouse

Collagen alpha-1(IX) chain is a protein that in humans is encoded by the COL9A1 gene.

This gene encodes one of the three alpha chains of type IX collagen, a collagen component of hyaline cartilage. Type IX collagen is usually found in tissues containing type II collagen, a fibrillar collagen. Studies in knockout mice have shown that synthesis of the alpha 1 chain is essential for assembly of type IX collagen molecules, a heterotrimeric molecule, and that lack of type IX collagen is associated with early onset osteoarthritis. Mutations in this gene may be associated with multiple epiphyseal dysplasia. Two transcript variants have been identified for this gene.
