= Matrilin-3 =

Protein-coding gene in the species Homo sapiens

MATN3

Identifiers
- Aliases: MATN3, DIPOA, EDM5, HOA, OADIP, OS2, matrilin 3, SEMDBCD
- External IDs: OMIM: 602109; MGI: 1328350; GeneCards: MATN3

Gene location (Human)
Chr.	Chromosome 2 (human)
Band	2p24.1	Start	19,992,052 bp
Band	2p24.1	End	20,012,668 bp

Gene location (Mouse)
Chr.	Chromosome 12 (mouse)
Band	12 A1.1|12 3.96 cM	Start	8,997,929 bp
Band	12 A1.1|12 3.96 cM	End	9,022,028 bp
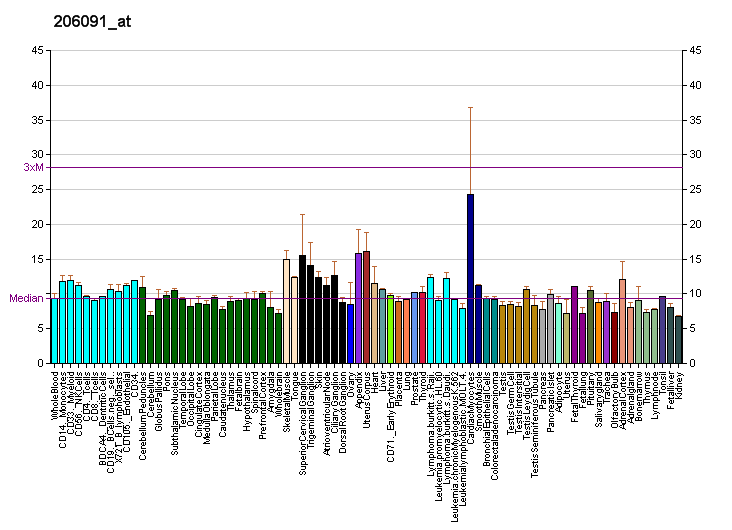
RNA expression pattern
Bgee	Human / Mouse (ortholog); Top expressed in: tibia; cartilage tissue; gonad; right lung; tibial nerve; upper lobe of left lung; C1 segment; lower lobe of lung; stromal cell of endometrium; amygdala / Top expressed in: intervertebral disc; intervertebral disk of cervical vertebra; intervertebral disk of thoracic vertebra; intervertebral disk of lumbar vertebra; iris; intercostal muscle; human fetus; sacrum; rib; fossa; More reference expression data
BioGPS	More reference expression data
Gene ontology
Molecular function	calcium ion binding; extracellular matrix structural constituent; protein binding
Cellular component	extracellular region; endoplasmic reticulum lumen; extracellular matrix; extracellular space; collagen-containing extracellular matrix
Biological process	skeletal system development; extracellular matrix organization; post-translational protein modification; growth plate cartilage chondrocyte morphogenesis; cartilage development
Sources:Amigo / QuickGO
Orthologs
Databases	NCBI: entry; OMA: entry
Species	Human	Mouse
Entrez	4148	17182
Ensembl	ENSG00000132031	ENSMUSG00000020583
UniProt	O15232	O35701
RefSeq (mRNA)	NM_002381	NM_010770
RefSeq (protein)	NP_002372	NP_034900
Location (UCSC)	Chr 2: 19.99 – 20.01 Mb	Chr 12: 9 – 9.02 Mb
PubMed search
- Wikidata
View/Edit Human	View/Edit Mouse

Matrilin-3 is a protein that in humans is encoded by the MATN3 gene. It is linked to the development of many types of cartilage, and part of the Matrilin family, which includes Matrilin-1, Matrilin-2, Matrilin-3, and Matrilin-4, a family of filamentous-forming adapter oligomeric extracellular proteins that are linked to the formation of cartilage and bone, as well as maintaining homeostasis after development. It is considered an extracellular matrix protein that functions as an adapter protein where the Matrilin-3 subunit can form both homo-tetramers and hetero-oligomers with subunits from Matrilin-1 which is the cartilage matrix protein. This restricted tissue has been strongly expressed in growing skeletal tissue as well as cartilage and bone.

The Matrilin-3 protein is protein linked to the development of cartilage and bone, and consists of one Von Willebrand Factor A domain, four epidermal growth factor domains, and a C-terminal coiled-coil domain. Matrilin-3 expression is mostly present in the development of cartilage prior to birth, and ceases to exist in adulthood unless linked with skeletal diseases like osteoarthritis, and chondrodysplasias like multiple epiphyseal dysplasia (MED) and spondyloepimetaphyseal dysplasia. The main function of Matrilin-3 is to enhance Collagen II and aggrecan expression which is essential in maintaining the elasticity and strength of cartilage.

== Gene ==
The matrilin-3 protein was assigned to chromosome region 2 (2p24 - p23) with the corresponding mRNA of 2.8kb which has been found expressed in every type of cartilage investigated. Matrilin-3 is arranged in 7 domains and is composed of 486 amino acid residues. The nucleotide sequence for Matrilin-3 in humans is 83% similar to the Matrilin-3 in mice, and 61% similar to that of chicken. The main differences between the different species differ mainly in the positively charged N-terminal domain, which is shorter in chicken compared to the Human Matrilin-3. The chicken Matrilin-3 also differs as it does not contain an insertion of a single aspartic acid residue in their four EGF -like domains, like in the human and mouse Matrilin-3 sequences.

== Structure ==
Each member of the Matrilin family consist of one or two Von Willebrand Factor A (vWFA) domains, several epidermal growth factor (EGF)- like domains, and an alpha-helical coiled-coil domain. Matrilin-3 does not contain the second vWFA -like domain that is present in the rest of the members of the Matrilin family. It is considered the shortest and least complex member of the family, consisting of only one Von Willebrand Factor A domain, four epidermal growth factor domains, and a C-terminal coiled-coil domain. The Matrilin-3 protein is considered a multimeric protein that can form bonds to triple helix collagens, decorin and biglycan, as it plays an important role as a linker molecule in the formation of the articular cartilage network.

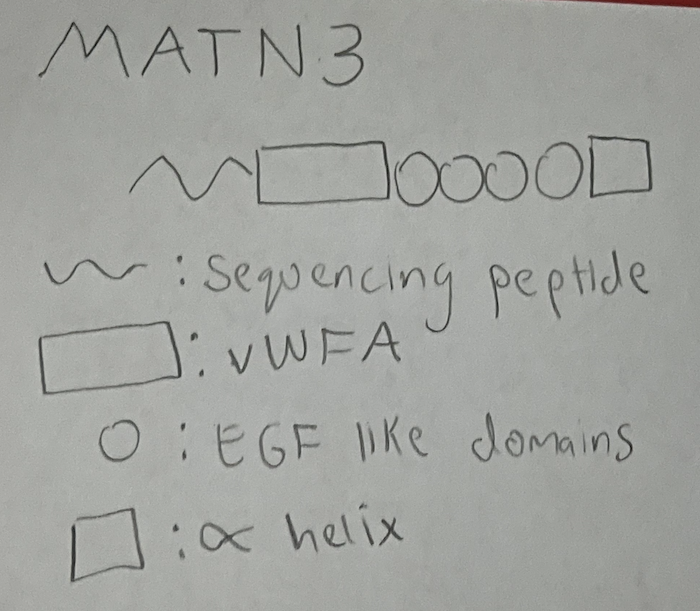

== Function ==
The main function of Matrilin-3 is to enhance Collagen II and aggrecan expression which is essential in maintaining the elasticity and strength of cartilage. Not only does it maintain cartilage structure but also its function and disease development. Matrilin-3 is mainly expressed in cartilage before birth, unless linked to disease development during adulthood.

In mice, Matrilin-3 is only expressed in the development of cartilage of the skeletal system. However, although Matrilin-1 continues to be expressed in tissues that remain cartilaginous throughout its life, Matrilin-3 is not presently expressed in these tissues after birth. Preliminary Immunoblot test result in the expression of Matrilin-3 being much higher in the fetal tissues than in adult. However, this does not mean that Matrilin-3 can not be expressed in mature cartilage. There is a strong correlation between strong Matrilin-3 gene expression and tissue damage. Strong Matrilin-3 gene expression has been consistently linked to development of osteoarthritis, which can develop from high levels of Matrilin-3 which tears down articular cartilage, resulting loss in not only the surface are but proliferating and hypertrophic areas.

Matrilin-3 plays a crucial role in keeping structural integrity of cartilage an extracellular matrix, and has been shown to have increased levels in osteoarthritis, and is also expressed in bone under normal conditions. It is also regulates extracellular matrix components of bone. Matrilin-3 interacts with TGF-β and BMP-2 to maintain homeostasis for the extracellular matrix of cartilage, as well as maintain chondrocytes during development. The types of cartilage that Matrilin-3 has been observed in are cartilaginous tissue, which includes articular and epiphyseal cartilage, as well as in cartilaginous anlage of developing bones. Matrilin-3 is essential in the formation of collagen-dependent networks as it connects the collagen independent pericellular network and cells, forming the filamentous connections. In skeletal development, Matrilin-3 is involved in mesenchymal differentiation, de-differentiation, chondrocyte terminal differentiation, and bone mineral density maintenance.

== Clinical significance ==
Osteoarthritis is caused by polymorphisms and mutations in several genes, especially Matrilin-3. Matrilin-3 mutations are linked to skeletal diseases like osteoarthritis, and chondrodysplasias like multiple epiphyseal dysplasia (MED) and spondyloepimetaphyseal dysplasia. A correlation between people with multiple epiphyseal dysplasia, or MED, has been linked to mutations in the vWFA domain of the Matrilin-3 protein.(ncbi) Point mutations in Matrilin-3 can affect protein folding and trafficking, as Matrilin-3 is retained and accumulated in the endoplasmic reticulum, leading to a reduced formation of filamentous networks around the cells. Matrilin-3 has also been shown to increase collagen II and aggrecan, while reducing ADAMTS5 and MMP-13 in chondrocytes, which suggest that there is a reduction of hypertrophy caused by inflammation.

It was also shown that when Matrilin-3 is bound to BMP2, the BMP receptor-mediated Smad1 phosphorylation and collagen X expression are prevented in chondrocytes, which designates that Matrilin-3 can act as an antagonist to prevent hypertrophic terminal differentiation of chondrocytes. The binding of Matrilin-3 altogether, increases AKT phosphorylation, increasing chondrocyte survival and ECM synthesis. The folding of the protein structure caused by MED-causing mutations, are most noticeably found in the B strands of the center of the vWFA domain. As Matrilin-3 is associated with skeletal diseases like Osteoarthritis, levels are shown to be increased and present in middle and deep cartilage zone, and possibly the subchondral bone as well. In bone, Matrilin-3 is not only found in not yet resorbed calcified cartilage but it is also actively synthesized by osteoblast and osteocytes.
