= UNC5C =

Protein-coding gene in the species Homo sapiens

Identifiers
- Aliases: UNC5C, UNC5H3, unc-5 netrin receptor C
- External IDs: OMIM: 603610; MGI: 1095412; GeneCards: UNC5C

Gene location (Human)
Chr.	Chromosome 4 (human)
Band	4q22.3	Start	95,162,504 bp
Band	4q22.3	End	95,549,206 bp

Gene location (Mouse)
Chr.	Chromosome 3 (mouse)
Band	3 H1|3 65.57 cM	Start	141,170,977 bp
Band	3 H1|3 65.57 cM	End	141,540,685 bp
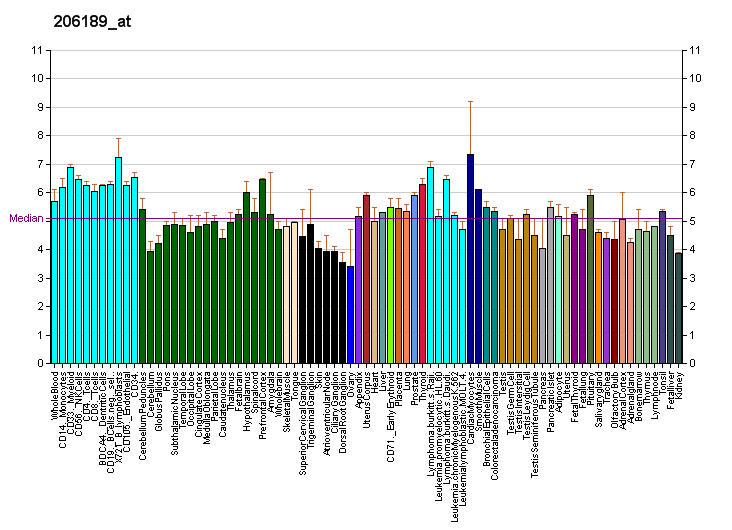
RNA expression pattern
Bgee	Human / Mouse (ortholog); Top expressed in: corpus callosum; tibia; internal globus pallidus; pons; inferior ganglion of vagus nerve; subthalamic nucleus; testicle; right coronary artery; C1 segment; superior vestibular nucleus / Top expressed in: genital tubercle; secondary oocyte; supraoptic nucleus; zygote; otic vesicle; ethmoid bone; suprachiasmatic nucleus; ascending aorta; cerebellar vermis; cribriform plate; More reference expression data
BioGPS	More reference expression data
Gene ontology
Molecular function	netrin receptor activity; netrin receptor activity involved in chemorepulsion; protein binding; protein kinase binding; tubulin binding
Cellular component	integral component of membrane; neuron projection; cell junction; plasma membrane; synapse; membrane; axon; dendrite; growth cone; soma; lamellipodium; filopodium; cell surface; cell projection
Biological process	positive regulation of apoptotic process; netrin-activated signaling pathway; multicellular organism development; brain development; regulation of cell migration; signal transduction; anterior/posterior axon guidance; axon guidance; apoptotic process; negative chemotaxis; chemorepulsion of axon; dorsal root ganglion development
Sources:Amigo / QuickGO
Orthologs
Databases	NCBI: entry; OMA: entry
Species	Human	Mouse
Entrez	8633	22253
Ensembl	ENSG00000182168	ENSMUSG00000059921
UniProt	O95185	O08747
RefSeq (mRNA)	NM_003728	NM_001293561; NM_009472
RefSeq (protein)	NP_003719	NP_001280490; NP_033498
Location (UCSC)	Chr 4: 95.16 – 95.55 Mb	Chr 3: 141.17 – 141.54 Mb
PubMed search
- Wikidata
View/Edit Human	View/Edit Mouse

Netrin receptor UNC5C is a protein that in humans is encoded by the UNC5C gene.

This gene product belongs to the UNC-5 family of netrin receptors. Netrins are secreted proteins that direct axon extension and cell migration during neural development. They are bifunctional proteins that act as attractants for some cell types and as repellents for others, and these opposite actions are thought to be mediated by two classes of receptors. The UNC-5 family of receptors mediate the repellent response to netrin; they are transmembrane proteins containing 2 immunoglobulin (Ig)-like domains and 2 type I thrombospondin motifs in the extracellular region.
