= Cartilage oligomeric matrix protein =

Protein found in humans

COMP
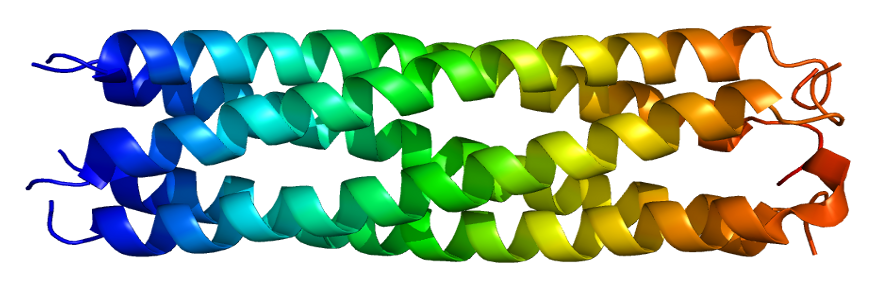

Identifiers
- Aliases: COMP, EDM1, EPD1, MED, PSACH, THBS5, cartilage oligomeric matrix protein, TSP5, CTS2
- External IDs: OMIM: 600310; MGI: 88469; GeneCards: COMP
Available structures
PDB	Ortholog search: PDBe RCSB
PDB	List of PDB id codes 3FBY

Gene location (Human)
Chr.	Chromosome 19 (human)
Band	19p13.11	Start	18,782,773 bp
Band	19p13.11	End	18,791,305 bp

Gene location (Mouse)
Chr.	Chromosome 8 (mouse)
Band	8 B3.3|8 34.15 cM	Start	70,826,208 bp
Band	8 B3.3|8 34.15 cM	End	70,834,716 bp
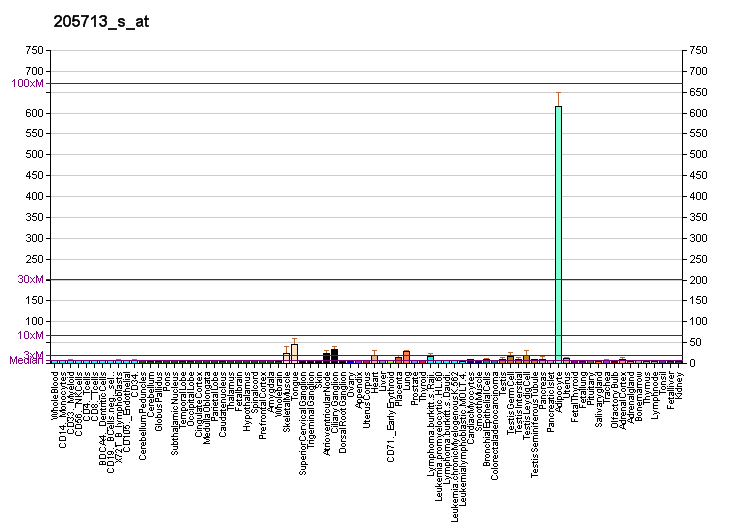
RNA expression pattern
Bgee	Human / Mouse (ortholog); Top expressed in: tibia; cartilage tissue; Achilles tendon; tendon of biceps brachii; synovial joint; popliteal artery; tibial arteries; saphenous vein; urethra; ascending aorta / Top expressed in: ankle; tibiofemoral joint; fossa; trachea; intercostal muscle; seminiferous tubule; condyle; spermatid; skin of external ear; calvaria; More reference expression data
BioGPS	More reference expression data
Gene ontology
Molecular function	protease binding; calcium ion binding; heparan sulfate proteoglycan binding; heparin binding; extracellular matrix structural constituent; protein binding; collagen binding; integrin binding; BMP binding; proteoglycan binding
Cellular component	extracellular matrix; extracellular exosome; extracellular space; extracellular region; protein-containing complex; collagen-containing extracellular matrix
Biological process	animal organ morphogenesis; growth plate cartilage development; skeletal system development; cell adhesion; extracellular matrix organization; negative regulation of apoptotic process; limb development; apoptotic process; ossification; chondrocyte development; endochondral bone growth; response to unfolded protein; blood coagulation; protein secretion; multicellular organism aging; regulation of gene expression; vascular associated smooth muscle contraction; protein processing; collagen fibril organization; bone mineralization; regulation of bone mineralization; BMP signaling pathway; multicellular organism growth; chondrocyte proliferation; tendon development; skin development; artery morphogenesis; musculoskeletal movement; neuromuscular process; cartilage development; bone morphogenesis; platelet aggregation; vascular associated smooth muscle cell development; bone growth; negative regulation of hemostasis; positive regulation of chondrocyte proliferation
Sources:Amigo / QuickGO
Orthologs
Databases	NCBI: entry; OMA: entry
Species	Human	Mouse
Entrez	1311	12845
Ensembl	ENSG00000105664	ENSMUSG00000031849
UniProt	P49747	Q9R0G6
RefSeq (mRNA)	NM_000095	NM_016685
RefSeq (protein)	NP_000086	NP_057894
Location (UCSC)	Chr 19: 18.78 – 18.79 Mb	Chr 8: 70.83 – 70.83 Mb
PubMed search
- Wikidata
View/Edit Human	View/Edit Mouse

Cartilage oligomeric matrix protein (COMP), also known as thrombospondin-5, is an extracellular matrix (ECM) protein primarily present in cartilage. In humans it is encoded by the COMP gene.

== Function ==
The protein encoded by this gene is a noncollagenous extracellular matrix (ECM) protein. It consists of five identical glycoprotein subunits, each with EGF-like and calcium-binding (thrombospondin-like) domains. Oligomerization results from formation of a five-stranded coiled coil and disulfide bonds. Binding to other ECM proteins such as collagen appears to depend on divalent cations. Mutations can cause the osteochondrodysplasias pseudoachondroplasia (PSACH) and multiple epiphyseal dysplasia (MED).

COMP is a marker of cartilage turnover. It is present in high quantities in fibrotic scars and systemic sclerosis, and it appears to have a role in vascular wall remodeling.
