= THSD7A =

Human protein-coding gene

Identifiers
- Aliases: THSD7A, thrombospondin type 1 domain containing 7A
- External IDs: OMIM: 612249; MGI: 2685683; GeneCards: THSD7A

Gene location (Human)
Chr.	Chromosome 7 (human)
Band	7p21.3	Start	11,370,365 bp
Band	7p21.3	End	11,832,198 bp

Gene location (Mouse)
Chr.	Chromosome 6 (mouse)
Band	6|6 A1	Start	12,311,609 bp
Band	6|6 A1	End	12,749,409 bp
RNA expression pattern
Bgee	Human / Mouse (ortholog); Top expressed in: decidua; glomerulus; metanephric glomerulus; renal medulla; buccal mucosa cell; sural nerve; spinal ganglia; visceral pleura; secondary oocyte; kidney tubule / Top expressed in: retinal pigment epithelium; habenula; vestibular membrane of cochlear duct; trigeminal ganglion; dorsal striatum; lateral geniculate nucleus; zygote; substantia nigra; gastrula; superior colliculus; More reference expression data
BioGPS	n/a
Gene ontology
Molecular function	growth factor activity
Cellular component	integral component of membrane; extracellular region; membrane; plasma membrane; cell projection
Biological process	cell differentiation; angiogenesis; actin cytoskeleton reorganization
Sources:Amigo / QuickGO
Orthologs
Databases	NCBI: entry; OMA: entry
Species	Human	Mouse
Entrez	221981	330267
Ensembl	ENSG00000005108	ENSMUSG00000032625
UniProt	Q9UPZ6	Q69ZU6
RefSeq (mRNA)	NM_015204	NM_001164805
RefSeq (protein)	NP_056019	NP_001158277
Location (UCSC)	Chr 7: 11.37 – 11.83 Mb	Chr 6: 12.31 – 12.75 Mb
PubMed search
- Wikidata
View/Edit Human	View/Edit Mouse

Thrombospondin type 1 domain-containing protein 7A (THSD7A) is a protein encoded in humans by the THSD7A gene. It is a membrane glycoprotein expressed by podocytes in the kidney.

== Structure ==
THSD7A is a single-pass transmembrane protein with a large extracellular region containing 21 thrombospondin type 1 domains and a short intracellular tail.

== Clinical significance ==
THSD7A is a target of autoantibodies in a subset of patients with membranous nephropathy. Its identification as a podocyte autoantigen in 2014 established THSD7A as a second antigen-associated form of the disease, after phospholipase A2 receptor 1. Anti-THSD7A antibodies have been proposed as biomarkers for this condition.
