= ADAMTS14 =

Protein-coding gene in humans

Identifiers
- Aliases: ADAMTS14, ADAM metallopeptidase with thrombospondin type 1 motif 14
- External IDs: OMIM: 607506; MGI: 2179942; GeneCards: ADAMTS14

Gene location (Human)
Chr.	Chromosome 10 (human)
Band	10q22.1	Start	70,672,506 bp
Band	10q22.1	End	70,762,441 bp

Gene location (Mouse)
Chr.	Chromosome 10 (mouse)
Band	10|10 B4	Start	61,032,891 bp
Band	10|10 B4	End	61,109,217 bp
RNA expression pattern
Bgee	Human / Mouse (ortholog); Top expressed in: gallbladder; vena cava; mucosa of transverse colon; putamen; appendix; tibial nerve; sural nerve; lateral nuclear group of thalamus; inferior ganglion of vagus nerve; pars compacta / Top expressed in: zone of skin; lip; morula; white adipose tissue; placenta; esophagus; uterus; quadriceps femoris muscle; skeletal muscle tissue; lung; More reference expression data
BioGPS	n/a
Gene ontology
Molecular function	peptidase activity; hydrolase activity; metallopeptidase activity; metal ion binding; metalloendopeptidase activity
Cellular component	extracellular region
Biological process	collagen catabolic process; proteolysis; collagen fibril organization
Sources:Amigo / QuickGO
Orthologs
Databases	NCBI: entry; OMA: entry
Species	Human	Mouse
Entrez	140766	237360
Ensembl	ENSG00000138316	ENSMUSG00000059901
UniProt	Q8WXS8	n/a
RefSeq (mRNA)	NM_080722; NM_139155	NM_001081127
RefSeq (protein)	NP_542453; NP_631894	n/a
Location (UCSC)	Chr 10: 70.67 – 70.76 Mb	Chr 10: 61.03 – 61.11 Mb
PubMed search
- Wikidata
View/Edit Human	View/Edit Mouse

ADAMTS14 encodes a member of the ADAMTS protein family. Family members share several distinct protein modules, including a propeptide region, a metalloproteinase domain, a disintegrin-like domain, and a thrombospondin type 1 (TS) motif. Individual members of this family differ in the number of C-terminal TS motifs, and some have unique C-terminal domains. The proteolytic process of the encoded preproprotein generates a mature enzyme. The enzyme cleaves the amino-propeptides of fibrillar collagens, enabling collagen fibril formation before the assembly of collagen, a major extracellular matrix (ECM) protein.
