= ADAMTS12 =

Protein-coding gene in humans

Identifiers
- Aliases: ADAMTS12, PRO4389, ADAM metallopeptidase with thrombospondin type 1 motif 12
- External IDs: OMIM: 606184; MGI: 2146046; GeneCards: ADAMTS12

Gene location (Human)
Chr.	Chromosome 5 (human)
Band	5p13.3-p13.2	Start	33,523,535 bp
Band	5p13.3-p13.2	End	33,892,019 bp

Gene location (Mouse)
Chr.	Chromosome 15 (mouse)
Band	15|15 A1	Start	11,064,790 bp
Band	15|15 A1	End	11,349,231 bp
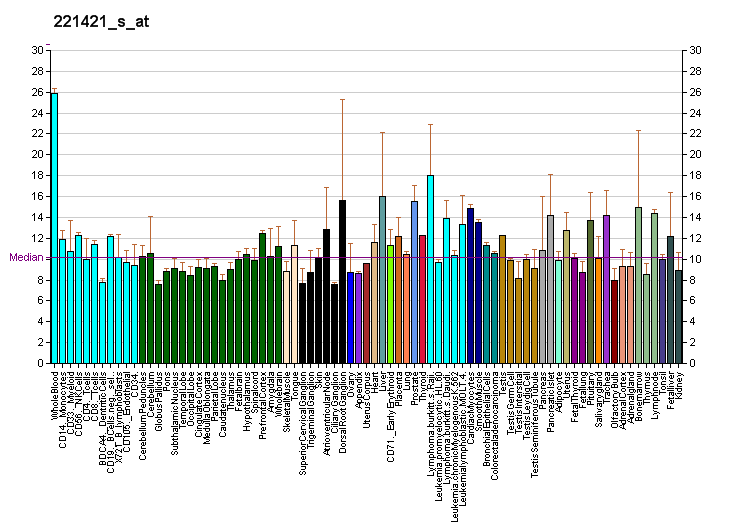
RNA expression pattern
Bgee	Human / Mouse (ortholog); Top expressed in: testicle; stromal cell of endometrium; visceral pleura; gonad; islet of Langerhans; adipose tissue; subcutaneous adipose tissue; sural nerve; abdominal fat; parietal pleura / Top expressed in: dermis; stroma of bone marrow; calvaria; efferent ductule; vestibular sensory epithelium; mammary gland; external carotid artery; aortic valve; internal carotid artery; otolith organ; More reference expression data
BioGPS	More reference expression data
Gene ontology
Molecular function	metal ion binding; peptidase activity; protein binding; metalloendopeptidase activity; hydrolase activity; metallopeptidase activity; zinc ion binding
Cellular component	extracellular region; extracellular matrix; collagen-containing extracellular matrix
Biological process	regulation of endothelial tube morphogenesis; proteoglycan catabolic process; negative regulation of hepatocyte growth factor receptor signaling pathway; negative regulation of cellular response to vascular endothelial growth factor stimulus; cellular response to tumor necrosis factor; cellular response to BMP stimulus; negative regulation of cellular response to hepatocyte growth factor stimulus; proteolysis; negative regulation of chondrocyte differentiation; cellular response to interleukin-1; regulation of inflammatory response; proteolysis involved in cellular protein catabolic process; cell-matrix adhesion; cell migration
Sources:Amigo / QuickGO
Orthologs
Databases	NCBI: entry; OMA: entry
Species	Human	Mouse
Entrez	81792	239337
Ensembl	ENSG00000151388; ENSG00000281690	ENSMUSG00000047497
UniProt	P58397	Q811B3
RefSeq (mRNA)	NM_030955; NM_001324511; NM_001324512	NM_175501
RefSeq (protein)	NP_001311440; NP_001311441; NP_112217	NP_780710
Location (UCSC)	Chr 5: 33.52 – 33.89 Mb	Chr 15: 11.06 – 11.35 Mb
PubMed search
- Wikidata
View/Edit Human	View/Edit Mouse

A disintegrin and metalloproteinase with thrombospondin motifs 12 is an enzyme that in humans is encoded by the ADAMTS12 gene.

This gene encodes a member of the ADAMTS (a disintegrin and metalloproteinase with thrombospondin motifs) protein family. Members of the family share several distinct protein modules, including a propeptide region, a metalloproteinase domain, a disintegrin-like domain, and a thrombospondin type 1 (TS-1) motif. Individual members of this family differ in the number of C-terminal TS-1 motifs, and some have unique C-terminal domains. The enzyme encoded by this gene contains eight TS-1 motifs. It may play roles in pulmonary cells during fetal development or in tumor processes through its proteolytic activity or as a molecule potentially involved in regulation of cell adhesion.
