= ADAMTS9 =

Protein-coding gene in humans

Identifiers
- Aliases: ADAMTS9, ADAM metallopeptidase with thrombospondin type 1 motif 9
- External IDs: OMIM: 605421; MGI: 1916320; GeneCards: ADAMTS9

Gene location (Human)
Chr.	Chromosome 3 (human)
Band	3p14.1	Start	64,515,654 bp
Band	3p14.1	End	64,688,000 bp

Gene location (Mouse)
Chr.	Chromosome 6 (mouse)
Band	6|6 D1	Start	92,749,680 bp
Band	6|6 D1	End	92,920,473 bp
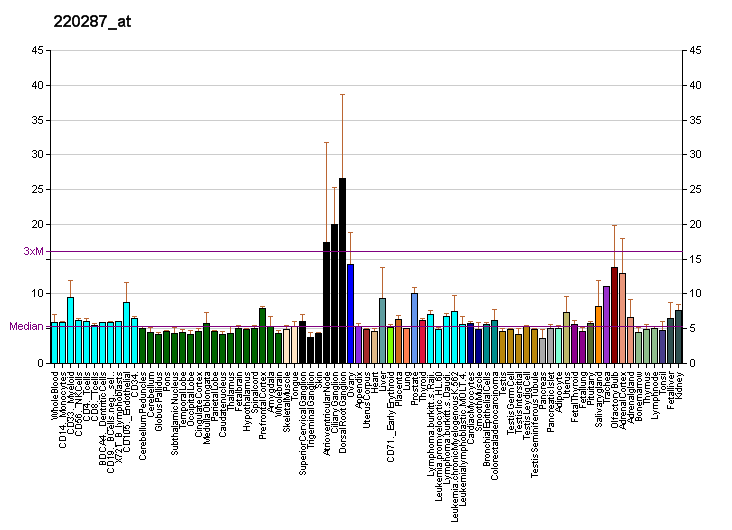
RNA expression pattern
Bgee	Human / Mouse (ortholog); Top expressed in: sural nerve; endometrium; parietal pleura; body of uterus; right ventricle; pericardium; upper lobe of left lung; left uterine tube; left coronary artery; ascending aorta / Top expressed in: renal corpuscle; gastrula; molar; external carotid artery; cumulus cell; vas deferens; left lung lobe; dermis; Gonadal ridge; efferent ductule; More reference expression data
BioGPS	More reference expression data
Gene ontology
Molecular function	zinc ion binding; peptidase activity; metalloendopeptidase activity; endopeptidase activity; hydrolase activity; metallopeptidase activity; metal ion binding
Cellular component	extracellular region; cell surface; extracellular space; extracellular matrix; endoplasmic reticulum; intracellular membrane-bounded organelle; collagen-containing extracellular matrix
Biological process	multicellular organism development; protein transport; regulation of developmental pigmentation; vesicle-mediated transport; positive regulation of melanocyte differentiation; proteolysis; glycoprotein catabolic process; heart valve morphogenesis; ventricular cardiac muscle tissue development; negative regulation of endothelial cell migration; extracellular matrix organization; aorta morphogenesis; endothelial cell-matrix adhesion; negative regulation of sprouting angiogenesis; response to bacterium
Sources:Amigo / QuickGO
Orthologs
Databases	NCBI: entry; OMA: entry
Species	Human	Mouse
Entrez	56999	101401
Ensembl	ENSG00000163638	ENSMUSG00000030022
UniProt	Q9P2N4	n/a
RefSeq (mRNA)	NM_182920; NM_001318781; NM_020249; NM_182921	NM_175314
RefSeq (protein)	NP_001305710; NP_891550	n/a
Location (UCSC)	Chr 3: 64.52 – 64.69 Mb	Chr 6: 92.75 – 92.92 Mb
PubMed search
- Wikidata
View/Edit Human	View/Edit Mouse

A disintegrin and metalloproteinase with thrombospondin motifs 9 is an enzyme that in humans is encoded by the ADAMTS9 gene.

This gene encodes a member of the ADAMTS (a disintegrin and metalloproteinase with thrombospondin motifs) protein family. Members of the family share several distinct protein modules, including a propeptide region, a metalloproteinase domain, a disintegrin-like domain, and a thrombospondin type 1 (TS) motif. Individual members of this family differ in the number of C-terminal TS motifs, and some have unique C-terminal domains. Members of the ADAMTS family have been implicated in the cleavage of proteoglycans, the control of organ shape during development, and the inhibition of angiogenesis. This gene is localized to chromosome 3p14.3-p14.2, an area known to be lost in hereditary renal tumors.
