= EGF-like domain =

Protein domain

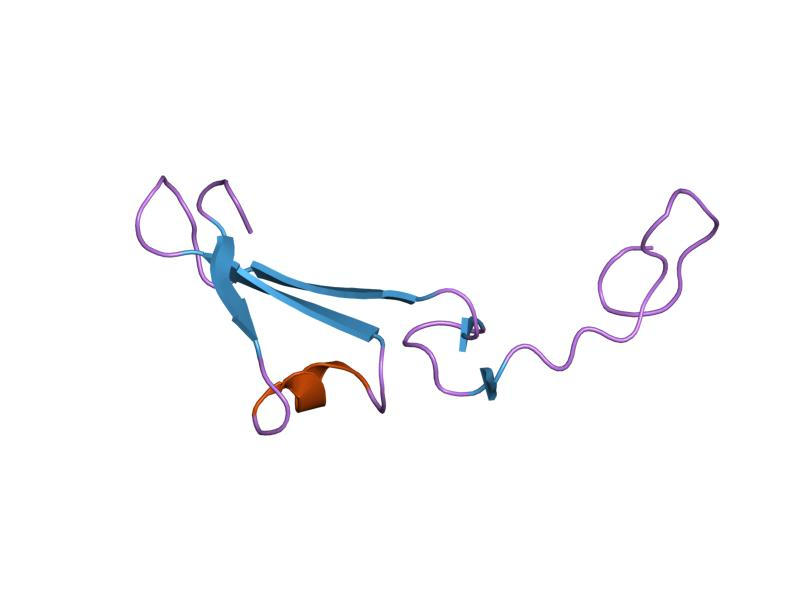
- Structure of the epidermal growth factor-like domain of heregulin-alpha.

Identifiers
- Symbol: EGF
- Pfam: PF00008
- Pfam clan: CL0001
- ECOD: 389.1.1
- InterPro: IPR000742
- PROSITE: PDOC00021
- SCOP2: 1apo / SCOPe / SUPFAM
- CDD: cd00053
Available protein structures:
- PDB: IPR000742 PF00008 (ECOD; PDBsum)
- AlphaFold: IPR000742; PF00008

EGF-like domain, extracellular
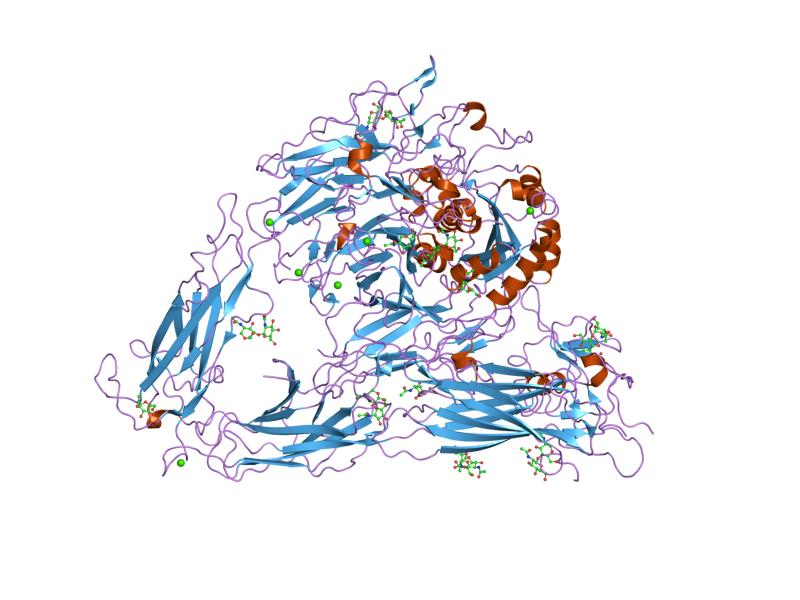
- crystal structure of the extracellular segment of integrin alphavbeta3

Identifiers
- Symbol: EGF_2
- Pfam: PF07974
- Pfam clan: CL0001
- InterPro: IPR013111
- CDD: cd00054
Available protein structures:
- PDB: IPR013111 PF07974 (ECOD; PDBsum)
- AlphaFold: IPR013111; PF07974

The EGF-like domain is an evolutionary conserved protein domain, which derives its name from the epidermal growth factor where it was first described. It comprises about 30 to 40 amino-acid residues and has been found in a large number of mostly animal proteins. Most occurrences of the EGF-like domain are found in the extracellular domain of membrane-bound proteins or in proteins known to be secreted. An exception to this is the prostaglandin-endoperoxide synthase. The EGF-like domain includes 6 cysteine residues which in the epidermal growth factor have been shown to form 3 disulfide bonds. The crystal structures of 4-disulfide EGF-domains have been solved from the laminin and integrin proteins. The main structure of EGF-like domains is a two-stranded β-sheet followed by a loop to a short C-terminal, two-stranded β-sheet. These two β-sheets are usually denoted as the major (N-terminal) and minor (C-terminal) sheets. EGF-like domains frequently occur in numerous tandem copies in proteins: these repeats typically fold together to form a single, linear solenoid domain block as a functional unit.

== Subtypes ==
Two main subtypes of EGF-like domains have been identified: The human EGF-like (hEGF) domain and the complement C1r-like (cEGF) domain. The latter occurs as two subtypes, 1 and 2, whereas there is only a single hEGF-like domain subtype. Both the hEGF- and cEGF-like domains contain three disulfides and derive from a common ancestor that carried four disulfides, of which one was lost during evolution. The lost cysteines of the common ancestor differ between cEGF- and hEGF-like domains and hence these types differ in their disulfide linkages. The differentiation of cEGF into subtype 1 and 2, which probably occurred after its split from hEGF, is based on different residue numbers between the distinct half-cystines. Both hEGF- and cEGF-like domains contain an N-terminal calcium binding region.

Both subtypes display unusual post-translational modifications, including O-glycosylations and β-hydroxylation of aspartate and asparagine residues. O-fucose modifications have only been detected in hEGF-like domains and they are important for the proper folding of the hEGF-like domain. β-Hydroxylation appears in hEGF- and cEGF-like domains, the former is hydroxylated on an aspartic acid while the latter is hydroxylated on an asparagine residue. The biological role of this post-translational modification is unclear.

Either or both subtypes may be found in proteins containing EGF-like domains. In many mitogenic and developmental proteins such as Notch and Delta the EGF-like domains are only of the hEGF type. Other proteins contain only cEGF such as thrombomodulin and the LDL-receptor. In mixed EGF-proteins the hEGF- and cEGF-like domains are grouped together with the hEGFs always being N-terminal of the cEGFs. Such proteins are involved in blood coagulation or are components of the extracellular matrix like fibrillin and LTBP-1 (Latent-transforming growth factor beta-binding protein 1). In addition to the aforementioned three disulfide hEGF- and cEGF-like types, there are proteins carrying a four-disulfide EGF-like domain like laminin and integrins.

== Role in the immune system and apoptosis ==
Selectins, a group of proteins that are involved in leukocyte rolling towards a source of inflammation, contain an EGF-like domain along with a lectin domain and short consensus repeats (SCRs). The functions of the EGF-like domain vary between different selectin types. For example, EGF-like domains appear essential to ligand binding by P-selectin but not L-selectin, and are thus essential to the proper adhesive function of platelets. Additionally, immature human dendritic cells appear to require interactions with the EGF-like domains of selectins during their maturation process.

The EGF-like domain is also part of laminins, an important group of extracellular proteins. The EGF-like domains are usually masked in intact membranes, but become exposed when the membrane is destroyed, e.g. during inflammation, thereby stimulating membrane growth and restoring damaged membrane parts. During apoptosis, the EGF-like domain repeats of stabilin-2 recognize and bind apoptotic cells, probably by recognizing phosphatidylserine, an apoptotic cell marker.

== Calcium binding ==
Calcium-binding EGF-like domains (cbEGF-like domains) play a central role in diseases such as Marfan syndrome or the X-chromosome linked hemorrhagic disorder hemophilia B and are among the most abundant extracellular calcium-binding domains. cbEGF- like domains impart specific functions to a variety of proteins in the blood clotting cascade, including coagulation factors VII, IX and X, protein C, and its cofactor protein S.

Calcium-binding EGF-like domains are typically composed of 45 amino acids, arranged as two antiparallel beta sheets. Several cysteine residues within this sequence form disulfide bridges. These domains show no significant structural deviations from other EGF-like domains, but can bind a single calcium ion via a consensus Asp-Leu/Ile-Asp-Gln-Cys motif. The binding affinity to calcium varies widely and often depends on adjacent domains. Calcium binding has been found to be associated with induction of unusual posttranslational modifications of cbEGF-like domains in proteins such as fibrillin-1.

Multiple cbEGF domains are often connected by one or two amino acids to form larger, repetitive arrays, referred to as 'cbEGF modules'. These modules may contain from 2 to 43 individual cbEGF domains. cbEGF modules exhibit altered calcium-binding affinity (compared to the isolated domains) and also are involved in regulation of other domains of the protein.

Mutant cbEGF-like domains with impaired calcium binding underlie some genetic disorders. For example, point mutations causing defective calcium binding to coagulation factor IX underlies some forms of hemophilia B, and mutations that prevent proper interactions between cbEGF domains in this protein may further complicate this disorder.

== Proteins containing this domain ==
Below is a list of human proteins containing the EGF-like domain:

- AGC1; AGRIN; AREG; ATRN; ATRNL1;
- BCAN; BMP1; BTC;
- C1S; CASPR4; CD248; CD93; CELSR1; CELSR2; CELSR3; CLEC14A; CNTNAP1; CNTNAP2; CNTNAP3; CNTNAP4; CNTNAP5; COMP; COX-2; CRB1; CRB2; CSPG3; CUBN;
- DLK1; DLL1; DLL3; DLL4; DNER;
- EDIL3; EGF; EGFL11; EGFL7; EGFL8; EGFL9; EGFLAM; EPGN; EREG;
- F7; F9; F10; F12; FAT; FAT2; FAT4; FBN1; FBN2; FBN3;
- GAS6;
- HABP2; HBEGF; HEG1; HGFAC; HMCN1; HSPG2;
- ITGB5;
- JAG1; JAG2;
- LDLR; LRP1; LRP10; LRP1B; LRP2; LRP4; LRP5; LRP6; LRP8; LTBP1; LTBP2; LTBP3; LTBP4;
- MATN1; MATN2; MATN3; MATN4; MEGF12; MEGF6; MEP1A; MEP1B; MFGE8; MMRN1; MMRN1; MUC4;
- NAGPA; NID1; NID2; NOTCH1; NOTCH2; NOTCH2NL; NOTCH3; NOTCH4; NRG1; NRG2; NRG3; NRG4; NRXN1; NRXN2; NRXN3; NTNG2;
- ODZ1; ODZ2; OIT3;
- PLAT; PP187; PROC; PROS1; PROZ; PTGS1; PTGS2;
- RAMP;
- SCUBE1; SCUBE2; SCUBE3; SEL-OB; SELE; SELL; SELP; SLIT1; SLIT2; SLIT3; SNED1; STAB1; STAB2; SVEP1;
- TECTA; TGFA; THBD; THBS1; THBS2; THBS4; TIE1; TLL1; TLL2; TMEFF1; TMEFF2; TNC; TNXB;
- UMOD;
- VASN; VCAN; VLDLR; VWA2;
- WIF1;
- ZAN;

== See also ==
- Epidermal growth factor
