= Prick =

Prick may refer to:

- Prick (manufacturing), a style of marking tool
- Goad or prick, a traditional farming implement
- Fingerprick, a wound for blood sample
- Prick (slang), vulgar slang for human penis or a derogatory term for a male
- Prick (magazine), a free tattoo and piercing monthly in Atlanta, Georgia, US
- Pricking or prick out (the seedlings), referring to transplanting from seed tray into individual pots

== Music ==
- Prick (band)
  - Prick (Prick album)
- Prick (Melvins album)
- "Prick", a song by Something for Kate
- "Prick", a song by Glaive on the deluxe edition of All Dogs Go to Heaven (EP)

== People with the surname ==
- Christof Prick, (born 1946), German orchestra conductor

== See also ==
- Kicking Against the Pricks, a Nick Cave and the Bad Seeds album
- Lilly Wood and the Prick, a French musical band
- Pricking the Lites, a ceremony used for appointing English sheriffs
- Prickle (disambiguation)
- Pricking, a process used by witch-prickers to detect witches
