= Planar cell polarity =

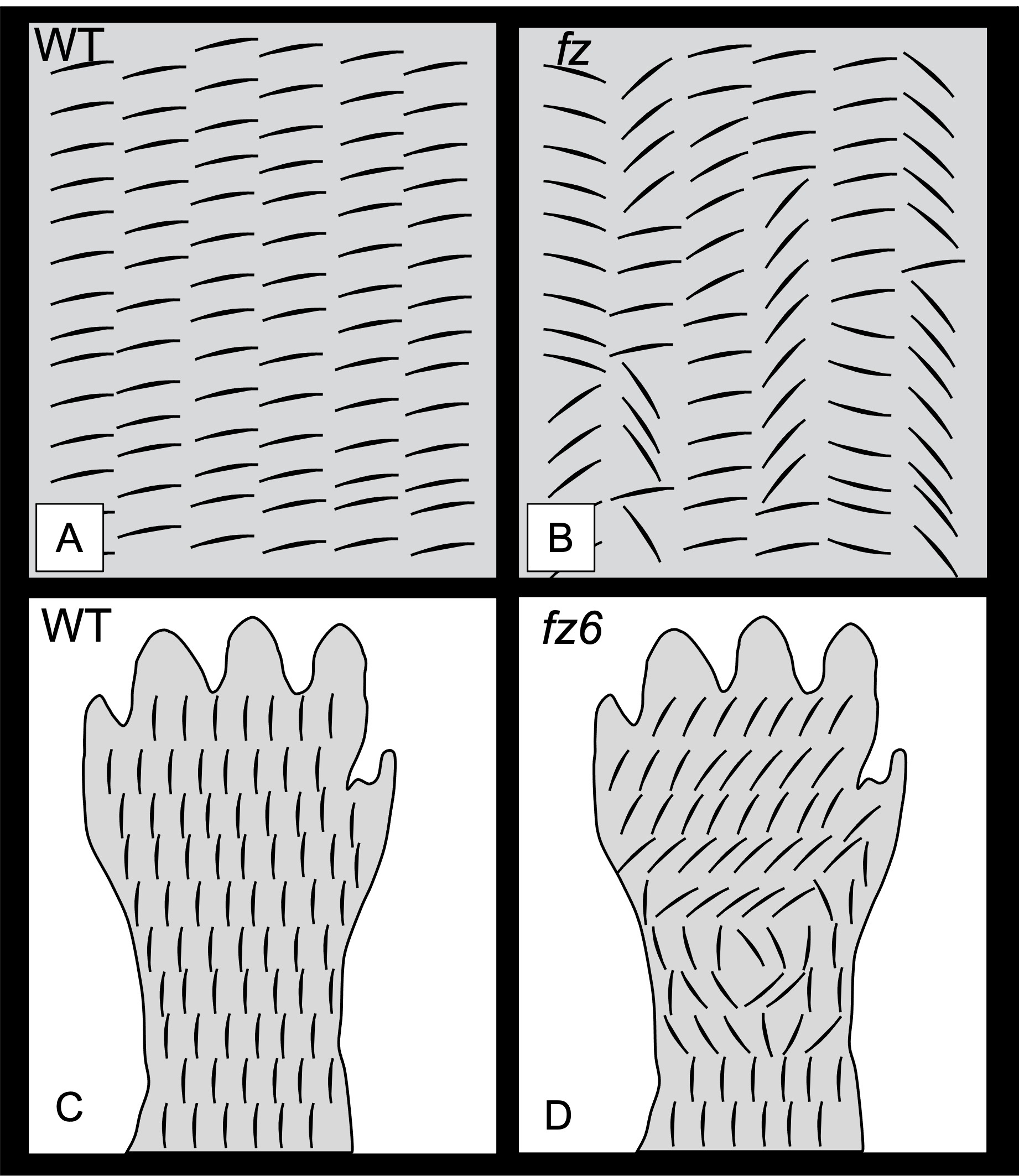
(A and B) Drosophila cuticular wing hair cells of the adult wing. Wing hairs point distally (to the right) in wild-type (WT) animals (A) but lose orientation in PCP mutants (fz) (B). (C and D) Hairs on the mouse paw point away from the body (pointing up) in WT (C) but grow in a swirling pattern in PCP mutants (fz6) (D).

Planar cell polarity (PCP) is a type of cell polarity in which the cells are oriented in a coordinated way across the plane of an epithelial tissue. The orientation is controlled by different cytoplasmic and transmembrane proteins concentrating on two opposite ends of the cells and forming dimers between neighboring cells. Common examples of PCP oriented tissue include animal fur, bird feathers, fish scales, wings of a fruit fly, and stereocilia in the inner ear. PCP also plays a major role in other biological processes, such as wound healing and embryonic development.

== Research history ==
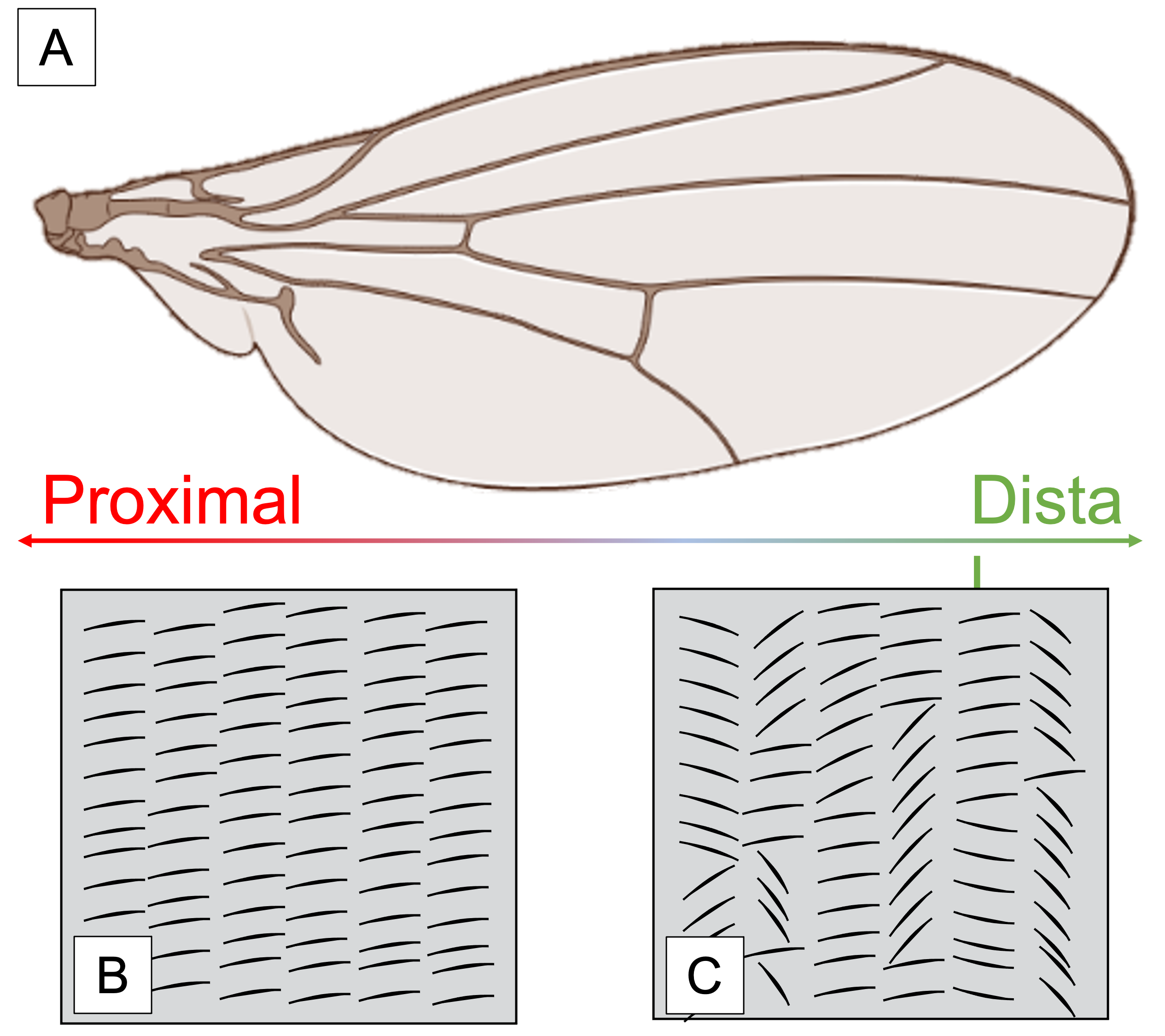
(A) The structure of Drosophila fly wing with and arrow showing the proximal and distal tips, (B) WT cuticular hairs in normal orientation towards the distal tip of the wing, (C) the disoriented cuticular hairs of the Frizzled(fz) mutant. The structures of the hairs are the same, only the orientation is different.

Planar cell polarity was first described in insects and then further defined in fruit flies (Drosophila melanogaster). Some of the earlier work on gene controlled polarity of fly wings was published by D. Gubb and A. García-Bellido in 1982 describing how the mutation of some genes resulted in a morphology change in the cuticle orientation on the fly body. The history of the PCP pathway as it was expanded by fly genetics work, which lead to the interesting names for PCP components like Frizzled, Van Gogh, and Dishevelled. These are typical nomenclature for new genes discovered in flies, which are often based on the description of the visual presentation of the mutant flies for each gene. Early PCP research focused on its role in embryology and genetics, but the discovery that PCP proteins were localized asymmetrically within the cell pushed the topic into the world of cell biology.

There was a surge in interest in the Planar Cell Polarity pathway after conserved PCP genes were found to be involved in important vertebrate processes vertebrate gastrulation, mammalian ear patterning and hearing, and neural tube closure. Discoveries from this popular wave of PCP research has found its involvement in polarized ciliary beating in the trachea and brain ventricles, oriented cell divisions, lung branching, and hair follicle alignment.

A major challenge to studying PCP is that the in vivo protein and cell contact signaling required to facilitate it are difficult to recapitulate in a cell culture dish. However, the recent advances in imaging technology and the expansion of genetic tools are helping to uncover how PCP works in the living cell and the role it plays in cell development and biology.

== Mechanism ==
Localization of core PCP proteins in a tissue sample. Each hexagon represents a single cell.

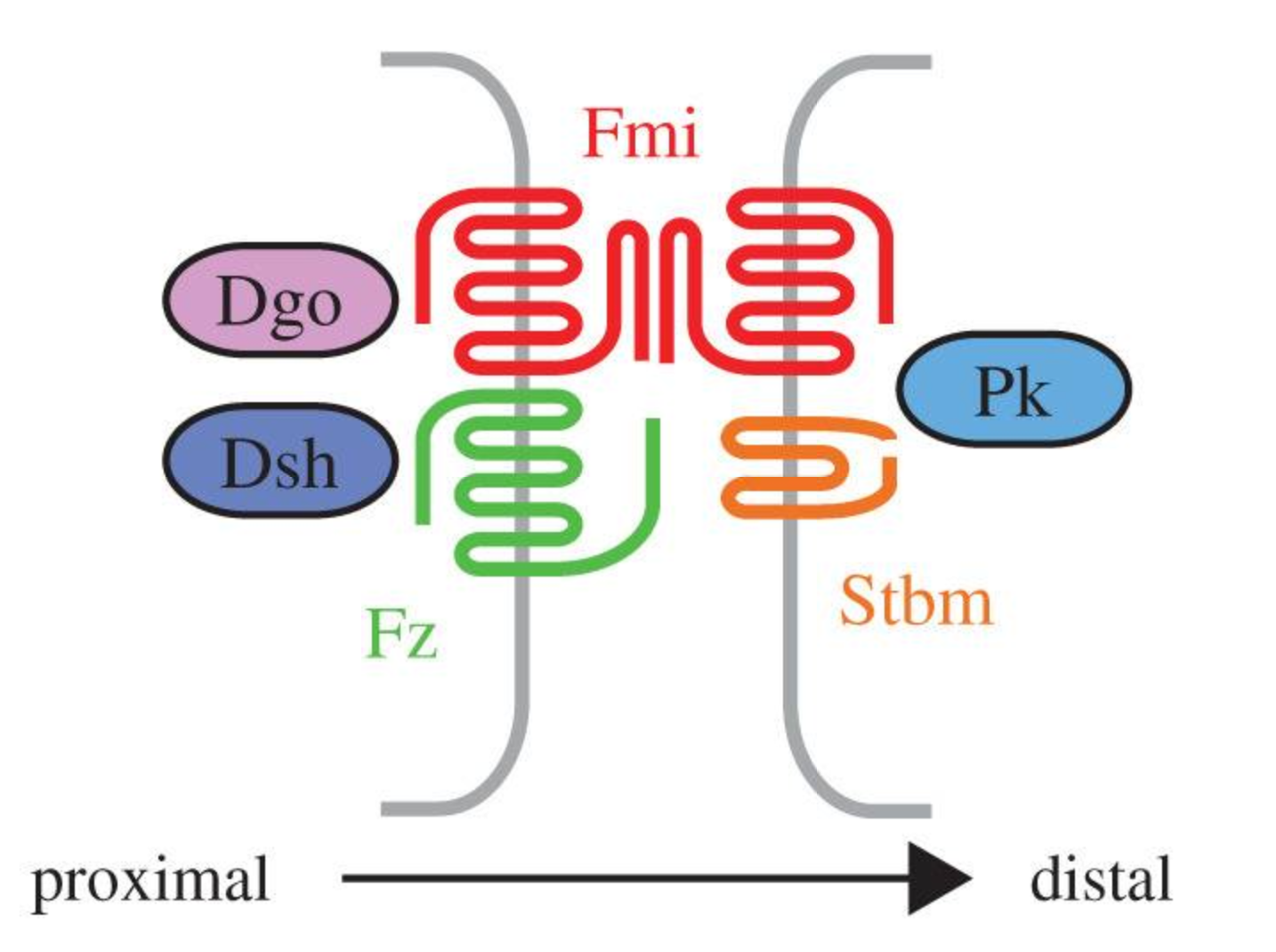
Interaction of core PCP proteins between two adjacent cells. Strabismus (Stbm) is another name for Van Gogh.

Planar cell polarity depends on an asymmetry created by the transmembrane proteins Van Gogh (Vang), Frizzled (Fz), and Flamingo (Fmi), as well as the cytoplasmic proteins Prickle (Pk), Dishevelled (Dsh), and Diego (Dgo). Although the proteins are initially evenly distributed around the cell, through a combination of mutual attraction and repulsion they end up grouped in two clusters at opposite ends of the cell. The proximal end contains bound Vang–Pk complexes, while the distal end contains Fz–Dsh–Dgo. The Vang and Fz proteins are bound together between neighboring cells with Fmi. Depending on the tissue, other protein complexes, such as the Fat–Dachsous (Ft–Ds) system, may also play a role in forming cell polarity.

The mechanism by which the polarity direction is initially determined is unclear. The main proposed mechanisms are the concentration gradients of the Ft–Ds system, the noncanonical Wnt signaling pathway, and mechanical forces acting on the shape of the tissue.
