= Follower neuron =

Type of nerve cell in the brain

A follower neuron is a nerve cell that arises in the developmental stage of the brain and whose growth and orientation is intrinsically related to pioneer neurons. These neurons can also be called later development neurons or follower cells. In the early stages of brain development, pioneer neurons define axonal trajectories that are later used as scaffolds by follower neurons, which project their growth cones and fasciculate with pioneer axons, forming a fiber tract and demonstrating a preference for axon-guided growth. It is thought that these neurons can read very accurate cues of direction and fasciculate or defasciculate in order to reach their target, even in a highly dense axon bundle.

== Follower – pioneer interactions ==
The interactions between follower and pioneer axons can be of two types: isotypic, when the axons are from the same neuronal type; and heterotypic, when the axons are from different neuronal types and have different origins and targets. In the development of complex vertebrate nervous systems, axons usually have the same origin and target, so they can be guided by isotypic interactions. It has been assumed that pioneer neurons have an important role in guiding follower axons, being essential for them to reach their targets. However, research into the role of pioneer neurons in specifying the projection path of follower axons has shown conflicting results, as some studies show that pioneer neurons are not required or only facilitate the extending along follower neurons’ normal path. For example, studies in C. elegans and Drosophila developing embryos showed that the correct outgrowth of follower neurons is not dependent on pioneer neurons; instead, they probably only give further cues to make sure that each axon is in the right axon tract. One study in Zebrafish showed that, when pioneer axons are eliminated, they can be replaced by follower axons, which then behave like pioneer ones. On the other hand, in invertebrates, pioneer neurons seem to have a central role in guiding follower neurons to their targets, because their removal leads to errors in follower neurons’ pathfinding.

=== Differences ===
Studies of follower and pioneer neuron populations show differences in growth cone morphology, actin dynamics and axonal elongation. Follower neurons are also less complex and appear to grow at higher speed. Although the markers that allow the differentiation of these two neuron populations, aren't yet known, they are distinguishable through the time and position of birth. Experiments in zebrafish, focused on the development of the posterior lateral line, have shown a differential expression of a transcription factor, neurod, overexpressed in the precursor cells of pioneer neurons, which suggests that this factor is probably necessary for the differentiation of these cell types.

==== In zebrafish ====
In the midline of zebrafish, pioneer neurons grow slower, their growth cones tend to be shorter and wider than followers’ and have up to 50% more filopodia. While follower neurons' filopodia are mostly forward oriented, pioneers’ are arranged in all directions. Studies in the neuromast show that followers establish topographic organization in it, dependent on the relative position of the cell body in its ganglion, while pioneers connect with posterior neuromasts, independently of their position in the ganglion. In zebrafish, the ablation of either the cell body or axon of the pioneer FBMN (facial branchiomotor neuron) blocks the migration of the follower FBMNs. The FBMNs undergo several phases of migration: the first phase, from r5 to r6, is regulated by the ability of the first FBMN to migrate into r5 and maintain connections with follower FBMNs through its trailing axon. The second phase, from r5 to r6, depends on interactions between FBMNs and the medial longitudinal fasciculus (MLF), as blocking MLF axons from entering the hindbrain can stall FBMN migration in r5. The first FBMN migrating on each side of the hindbrain often travels ahead of the following FBMNs and seems to send out more and longer projections into the neuroepithelial environment. This suggests that the first FBMN to migrate might act as a “pioneer” neuron that leads follower neurons through the hindbrain. The ablation of a second migrating FBMN cell causes some migration defects, which may be an indirect consequence of cutting the link between the pioneer and the follower neurons. In the cases where second cell ablation does not affect migration, it is plausible that the trailing axon of the pioneer neuron makes contact with another follower FBMN, which allows correct migration. It is hypothesized that the second cell is not important for its having pioneer-like capacity but in being the closest FBMN to the pioneer, linking the pioneer to follower FBMNs. It is the cell bodies of the follower neurons that follow the axons of the pioneer neurons, unlike previously thought, however, the idea that the initial pioneer axon tract is needed for guidance remains.

== The role of cadherins ==
The molecular basis of pioneer-mediated navigation of follower axons is not fully understood, but, presumably, requires specific adhesion between pioneer and follower neurons. The cadherin superfamily constitutes one of the largest families of cell-adhesion molecules (CAMs). Cadherins mediate neuronal interactions in an extensive way and are also associated with selective axon-axon fasciculation. Cadherin domains take part in homophilic cell-cell adhesion. Classical cadherins are characterized by a conserved catenin-binding side in their intracellular tail that provides a dynamic link to the cytoskeleton.

=== In zebrafish ===
Cell adhesion mediated by Cadherin-2 (Cdh2) is important during both phases of migration for maintaining interactions between FBMNs (facial branchiomotor neurons) and the trailing axon of the pioneer neuron, as well as the MLF (medial longitudinal fasciculus). The pioneer itself is able to migrate independently of both Cdh2 and the MLF, suggesting the use of other factors to travel through the hindbrain. Cdh2 participates in early FBMN migration, having an important role in interactions between follower FBMNs and the trailing axon of the pioneer neuron. When follower FBMNs loses contact with the pioneer, it may partially lead to the defects on migration observed in Cdh2-depleted embryos. It is also important for the interaction between MLF and FBMNs. Depleting Cdh2 reduces this interaction, allowing FBMNs to migrate towards the midline. Although the role of Cdh2 in controlling adhesion of neuroepithelial cells possibly contributes to the FBMN migration defects found in Cdh2-depleted embryos, Cdh2-mediated cohesion between different FBMNs and also between FBMNs and the MLF may also be crucial for the migration process.

=== In Caenorhabditis elegans ===
FMI-1 is a cadherin and an adhesion G-protein coupled receptor in C. elegans, ortholog of Drosophila’s flamingo and vertebrate CELSR geneth a highly conservative structure, divided in extra- and intracellular domains. It is a cell-type dependent axon guidance factor. It is expressed in both pioneer and follower axons and it was observed that mutations in the fmi-1 gene caused considerable axon navigation deficiency in pioneer axons of C. elegans’ ventral nerve cord. When this happens, follower axons that depend exclusively of pioneer guidance frequently detach from them. FMI-1’s extracellular domain influences follower axon navigation throughout the mediation of pioneer – follower axon adhesion and its intracellular domain is necessary for signal transduction for pioneer axon navigation. Therefore, this class of molecules has both a cell-cell adhesion role and a cell-surface receptor role, in axon navigation.

== Role of glia ==
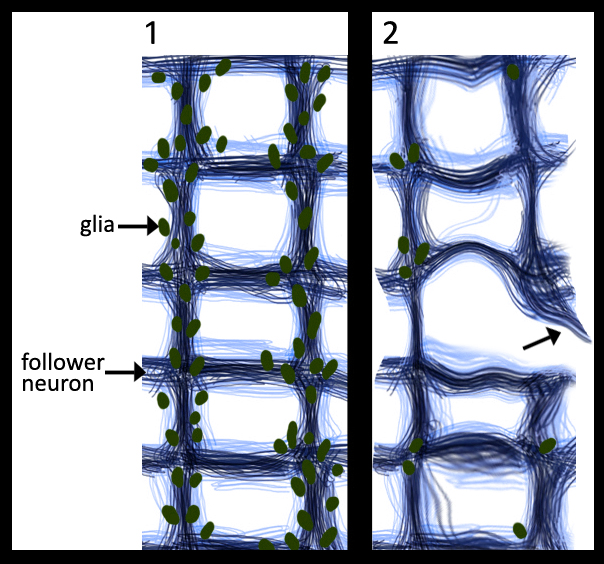
Fig.1 – Effects of glial ablation on follower neurons in Drosophila. 1 – Wild type situation; 2 – Ablated embryoWhen there is an absence of glia, follower axons misroute. Arrow indicates deviation. Adapted from Hidalgo A. and Booth GE. (2000)

There are reciprocal interactions between neurons and glia during axon guidance, which restricts glial movement and axonal trajectories. Pioneer neurons are responsible for preserving the survival of glial cells and the achievement of their normal positions. On the other hand, glia are important to determine the pathfinding of pioneer neurons and preserve the survival of follower neurons and their trajectories. Studies show that it is difficult to pinpoint the importance of glia on the extension of most follower neurons. In glia ablation experiments, follower axons can misroute away from their wild-type longitudinal pathways and along the intersegmental nerve. Nevertheless, this does not allow to infer the effect of absence of glia on follower trajectories seen as mosaic glia ablation can be bypassed by extending axons. In a situation of complete glial absence (provided by the usage of a glial cells missing mutant), there are still neurons along the route of axonal extension, which would not correspond to a predictable lack of glia case. The most remarkable observation lies in the general disruption of the scaffold formed by the axonal fascicles separated by the glia, which can be verified in both ablation and mutation situations. Follower axons can still extend along the longitudinal pathways, however, their selective fasciculation routes are altered.

In the central nervous system of Drosophila melanogaster, recent studies show that, whereas the pioneer neurons do not depend on glia for survival, the later extending follower neurons do, revealing a role for survival control in the establishment of axonal trajectories. Data shows that there is an increase in both follower neuron apoptosis frequency and severity of respective phenotype in individuals with glia ablations or glia-free mutants. This demonstrates that compromising glial function (through ablation or mutation) results in increased follower neuron programmed cell death.

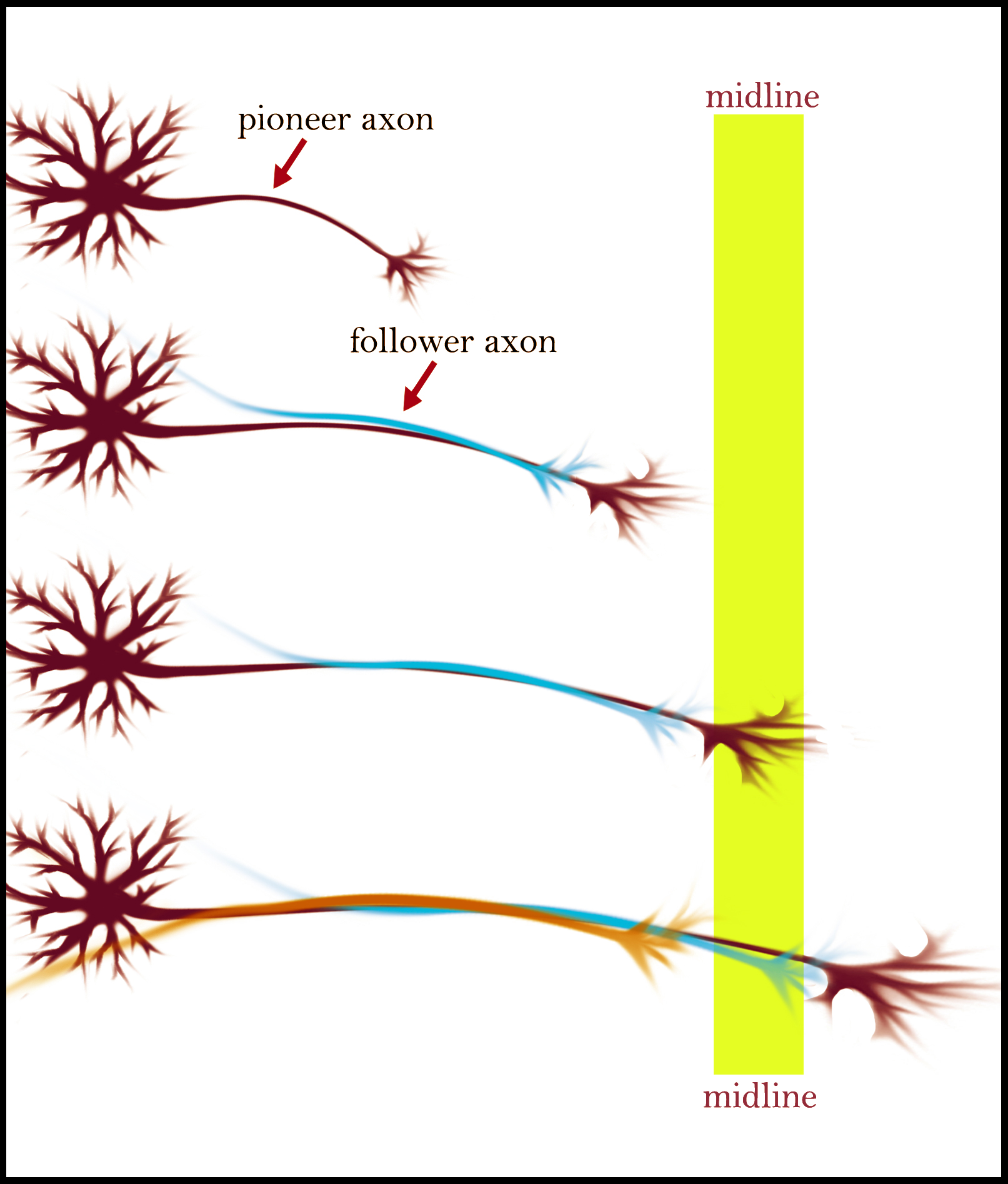
Fig.2 – Cues from the midline lead the pioneer axon (bordeaux), while the follower neurons (blue and orange) trail it. Adapted from Bak M. and Fraser S.E. (2003)

Other studies in the Drosophila central nervous system show that in the absence of either glia or pioneer neurons, longitudinal follower axons that would not normally cross the midline, cross it in order to reach an alternative axonal and/or glial contact. This is likely to be due to a combined loss of axonal fasciculation cues, glial contact and trophic support glia.

In resume, there seems to be a differential requirement for glia depending on neuronal type, where follower cells require their existence for survival. This has implications in the previous understandings of central nervous system formation, implying an asymmetry in neuronal patterning. Once the first longitudinal fascicles are formed, follower neurons can cross the midline and fasciculate with pioneer axons, being regulated by longitudinal glia. This differential neuron dependence on glia provides the means for axon guidance through neuronal survival.

== Example of follower neuron function ==
The pre-Bötzinger complex (pre-BötC) is essential for generation of respiratory rhythm in mammals and studies in rats have provided information about the importance of follower neurons in this process. Their findings suggest an excitatory-inhibitory synaptic transmission in pre-BötC, represented by somatostatin and neurokinin 1 receptors immunoreactivity, in which rhythmogenic neurons interact with large excitatory follower neurons and synchronize their activity to respiratory control and rhythmogenesis.

== Cryptic pioneer neuron ==
Retinal growth cones were thought to be related to follower neurons. However, studies in zebrafish have revealed that these growth cones followed a pretract morphologically different from its surroundings and extending out in front of regular pioneer neurons. This seems to imply a pioneer nature, masked by their location, and it is possible that other “cryptic” pioneer growth cones and pretracts may be common across the nervous system, confused by a follower origin.
