= Latent TGF-beta binding protein =

Family of carrier proteins

The latent TGF-beta binding proteins (LTBP) are a family of carrier proteins.

LTBP is a family of secreted multidomain proteins that were originally identified by their association with the latent form of transforming growth factors. They interact with a variety of extracellular matrix proteins and may play a role in the regulation of TGF beta bioavailability.

== Genes ==
latent transforming growth factor beta binding protein 1

Identifiers
- Symbol: LTBP1
- Alt. symbols: TGF-beta1-BP-1
- NCBI gene: 4052
- HGNC: 6714
- OMIM: 150390
- RefSeq: NM_206943
- UniProt: Q14766

Other data
- Locus: Chr. 2 p22-p21
Search for
- Structures: Swiss-model
- Domains: InterPro

latent transforming growth factor beta binding protein 2

Identifiers
- Symbol: LTBP2
- Alt. symbols: LTBP3, C14orf141
- NCBI gene: 4053
- HGNC: 6715
- OMIM: 602091
- RefSeq: NM_000428
- UniProt: Q14767

Other data
- Locus: Chr. 14 q24.3
Search for
- Structures: Swiss-model
- Domains: InterPro

latent transforming growth factor beta binding protein 3

Identifiers
- Symbol: LTBP3
- Alt. symbols: LTBP2
- NCBI gene: 4054
- HGNC: 6716
- OMIM: 602090
- RefSeq: NM_021070
- UniProt: Q9NS15

Other data
- Locus: Chr. 11 q12
Search for
- Structures: Swiss-model
- Domains: InterPro

latent transforming growth factor beta binding protein 4

Identifiers
- Symbol: LTBP4
- Alt. symbols: LTBP-4, LTBP-4L
- NCBI gene: 8425
- HGNC: 6717
- OMIM: 604710
- RefSeq: NM_003573
- UniProt: Q8N2S1

Other data
- Locus: Chr. 19 q13.1-13.2
Search for
- Structures: Swiss-model
- Domains: InterPro
