= PR/SET domain 15 =

Protein-coding gene in humans

PRDM15

Identifiers
- Aliases: PRDM15, C21orf83, PFM15, ZNF298, PR domain 15, PR/SET domain 15
- External IDs: OMIM: 617692; MGI: 1930121; GeneCards: PRDM15

Gene location (Human)
Chr.	Chromosome 21 (human)
Band	21q22.3	Start	41,798,225 bp
Band	21q22.3	End	41,879,482 bp

Gene location (Mouse)
Chr.	Chromosome 16 (mouse)
Band	16|16 C4	Start	97,592,667 bp
Band	16|16 C4	End	97,653,050 bp
RNA expression pattern
Bgee	Human / Mouse (ortholog); Top expressed in: sural nerve; mucosa of ileum; gonad; granulocyte; bone marrow cell; lymph node; testicle; tonsil; tendon of biceps brachii; tibialis anterior muscle / Top expressed in: superior cervical ganglion; hand; tail of embryo; cumulus cell; genital tubercle; lobe of prostate; otolith organ; granulocyte; lacrimal gland; utricle; More reference expression data
BioGPS	n/a
Gene ontology
Molecular function	methyltransferase activity; transferase activity; DNA binding; metal ion binding; nucleic acid binding; DNA-binding transcription factor activity, RNA polymerase II-specific; RNA polymerase II cis-regulatory region sequence-specific DNA binding; promoter-specific chromatin binding
Cellular component	nucleus; nucleoplasm; nuclear body
Biological process	methylation; transcription, DNA-templated; regulation of transcription, DNA-templated; regulation of transcription by RNA polymerase II; negative regulation of MAPK cascade; positive regulation of transcription by RNA polymerase II; positive regulation of canonical Wnt signaling pathway; regulation of stem cell division; multicellular organism development
Sources:Amigo / QuickGO
Orthologs
Databases	NCBI: entry; OMA: entry
Species	Human	Mouse
Entrez	63977	114604
Ensembl	ENSG00000141956	ENSMUSG00000014039
UniProt	P57071	E9Q8T2
RefSeq (mRNA)	NM_001040424; NM_001282934; NM_022115	NM_144789; NM_001359077; NM_001359078
RefSeq (protein)	NP_001035514; NP_001269863; NP_071398	NP_001346006; NP_001346007; NP_659038; NP_001390355; NP_001390356 NP_001390357; NP_001390358; NP_001390359; NP_001390360; NP_001390361; NP_001390366; NP_001390367
Location (UCSC)	Chr 21: 41.8 – 41.88 Mb	Chr 16: 97.59 – 97.65 Mb
PubMed search
- Wikidata
View/Edit Human	View/Edit Mouse

PR/SET domain 15 is a protein that in humans is encoded by the PRDM15 gene.

PRDM15 safeguards naive pluripotency by transcriptionally regulating WNT and MAPK-ERK signaling.

PRDM15 modulates WNT and MAPK/ERK signaling by directly promoting the expression of Rspo1 (R-spondin1) and Spry1 (Sprouty1). Mzoughi et al., have shown that PRDM15 binds to the promoter region of both genes, inducing changes in the local chromatin to promote their transcription. In a second report, the same team has identified a loss-of-function mutation in patients with holoprosencephaly and microcephaly. They used mouse models and embryonic stem cells to uncover an unexpected link between Notch and WNT/PCP signaling and early embryo patterning. Both pathways are deregulated in PRDM15 mutants, leading to patterning defects and a spectrum of anterior brain malformations.

== See also ==
- Notch proteins
- Planar cell polarity (PCP)
- SET domain
