= PNDS =

PNDS may refer to:

- Nigerien Party for Democracy and Socialism (Parti Nigerien pour la Democratie et le Socialisme), a political party in Niger
- Paraneoplastic neurological disorder
- Persistent Neurodevelopmental Stuttering, associated with the human gene NAGPA
- Post nasal drip syndrome, a disorder that occurs when excessive mucus is produced by the nasal mucosa

== See also ==
- PND (disambiguation)
