= Prickle (protein) =

prickle-like 1 (Drosophila)

Identifiers
- Symbol: PRICKLE1
- NCBI gene: 144165
- OMIM: 608500

Prickle is also known as REST/NRSF-interacting LIM domain protein, which is a putative nuclear translocation receptor. Prickle is part of the non-canonical Wnt signaling pathway that establishes planar cell polarity. A gain or loss of function of Prickle1 causes defects in the convergent extension movements of gastrulation. In epithelial cells, Prickle2 establishes and maintains cell apical/basal polarity. Prickle1 plays an important role in the development of the nervous system by regulating the movement of nerve cells.

The first prickle protein was identified in Drosophila as a planar cell polarity protein. Vertebrate prickle-1 was first found as a rat protein that binds to a transcription factor, neuron-restrictive silencer factor (NRSF). It was then recognized that other vertebrates including mice and humans have two genes that are related to Drosophila prickle. Mouse prickle-2 was found to be expressed in mature neurons of the brain along with mouse homologs of Drosophila planar polarity genes flamingo and dischevelled. Prickle interacts with flamingo to regulate sensory axon advance at the transition between the peripheral nervous system and the central nervous system. Also, Prickle1 interacts with RE1-silencing transcription factor (REST) by transporting REST out of the nucleus. REST turns off several critical genes in neurons by binding to particular regions of DNA in the nucleus.

prickle-like 2 (Drosophila)

Identifiers
- Symbol: PRICKLE2
- NCBI gene: 166336
- OMIM: 608501

Prickle is recruited to the cell surface membrane by strabismus, another planar cell polarity protein. In the developing Drosophila wing, prickle becomes concentrated at the proximal side of cells. Prickle can compete with the ankyrin-repeat protein Diego for a binding site on Dishevelled.

In Drosophila, prickle is present inside cells in multiple forms due to alternative splicing of the prickle mRNA. The relative levels of the alternate forms may be regulated and involved in the normal control of planar cell polarity.

Mutations in Prickle genes can cause epilepsy in humans by perturbing Prickle function. One mutation in Prickle1 gene can result in Prickle1-Related Progressive Myoclonus Epilepsy-Ataxia Syndrome. This mutation disrupts the interaction between prickle-like 1 and REST, which results in the inability to suppress REST. Gene knockdown of Prickle1 by shRNA or dominant-negative constructs results in decreased axonal and dendritic extension in neurons in the hippocampus. Prickle1 gene knockdown in neonatal retina causes defects in axon terminals of photoreceptors and in inner and outer segments.
