= Notch 4 =

Protein-coding gene in the species Homo sapiens

NOTCH4

Identifiers
- Aliases: NOTCH4, INT3, notch 4, notch receptor 4
- External IDs: OMIM: 164951; MGI: 107471; GeneCards: NOTCH4

Gene location (Human)
| Chr. | Chromosome 6 (human) |
| Band | 6p21.32 | Start | 32,194,843 bp |
| Band | 6p21.32 | End | 32,224,067 bp |

Gene location (Mouse)
| Chr. | Chromosome 17 (mouse) |
| Band | 17 B1|17 18.15 cM | Start | 34,783,242 bp |
| Band | 17 B1|17 18.15 cM | End | 34,807,477 bp |
RNA expression pattern
| Bgee | Human / Mouse (ortholog); Top expressed in: apex of heart; right lung; subcutaneous adipose tissue; upper lobe of left lung; lactiferous gland; left ventricle; right auricle of heart; right lobe of thyroid gland; left lobe of thyroid gland; myometrium / Top expressed in: external carotid artery; tail of embryo; gastrula; internal carotid artery; right lung; right lung lobe; left lung; lumbar subsegment of spinal cord; myocardium of ventricle; left lung lobe; More reference expression data |
| BioGPS | n/a |
Gene ontology
| Molecular function | protein binding; protein heterodimerization activity; calcium ion binding; signaling receptor activity; Notch binding |
| Cellular component | integral component of membrane; cytosol; endoplasmic reticulum membrane; membrane; Golgi membrane; integral component of plasma membrane; nucleoplasm; extracellular region; cell surface; nucleus; plasma membrane |
| Biological process | regulation of transcription, DNA-templated; negative regulation of cell differentiation; endothelial cell morphogenesis; negative regulation of endothelial cell differentiation; morphogenesis of a branching structure; transcription, DNA-templated; mammary gland development; positive regulation of transcription, DNA-templated; multicellular organism development; positive regulation of transcription of Notch receptor target; branching involved in blood vessel morphogenesis; cell fate determination; endothelial cell differentiation; transcription initiation from RNA polymerase II promoter; Notch signaling pathway; cell differentiation; regulation of developmental process; vasculature development; wound healing; hemopoiesis; miRNA-mediated gene silencing by inhibition of translation; positive regulation of Notch signaling pathway; negative regulation of Notch signaling pathway |
Sources:Amigo / QuickGO
Orthologs
| Databases | NCBI: entry; OMA: entry |
| Species | Human | Mouse |
| Entrez | 4855 | 18132 |
| Ensembl | ENSG00000234876; ENSG00000238196; ENSG00000204301; ENSG00000232339; ENSG00000223355 ENSG00000235396; ENSG00000206312 | ENSMUSG00000015468 |
| UniProt | Q99466 | P31695 |
| RefSeq (mRNA) | NM_004557 | NM_010929 |
| RefSeq (protein) | NP_004548 | NP_035059 |
| Location (UCSC) | Chr 6: 32.19 – 32.22 Mb | Chr 17: 34.78 – 34.81 Mb |
| PubMed search |
- Wikidata
| View/Edit Human | View/Edit Mouse |

Neurogenic locus notch homolog 4 (Notch 4) is a protein that in humans is encoded by the NOTCH4 gene located on chromosome 6.

== Gene ==
An alternative splice variant of the NOTCH4 gene has been described, but its biological significance has not been determined.

== Structure ==
The neurogenic locus notch homolog 4 protein is a member of the Notch family. Members of this type 1 transmembrane protein family share structural characteristics. These include an extracellular domain consisting of multiple epidermal growth factor-like (EGF) repeats, and an intracellular domain that consists of multiple, but different, domain types.

== Function ==
Notch protein family members play a role in a variety of developmental processes by controlling cell fate decisions. The Notch signaling pathway is an evolutionarily conserved intercellular signaling pathway that regulates interactions between physically adjacent cells

In Drosophila, notch interacts with its cell-bound ligands (delta and serrate), and establishes an intercellular signaling pathway that then plays a key role in development. Homologues of the notch-ligands have also been identified in humans, but precise interactions between these ligands and the human notch homologues remain to be determined. The notch protein is cleaved in the trans-Golgi network, and then presented on the cell surface as a heterodimer. The protein functions as a receptor for membrane bound ligands, and may play a role in vascular, renal, and hepatic development.

== Clinical significance ==
Mutations in the notch4 gene may be associated with susceptibility to schizophrenia in a small portion of cases.
