= VWA2 =

Protein

Identifiers
- Aliases: VWA2, AMACO, CCSP-2, NET42, von Willebrand factor A domain containing 2, CCSP2
- External IDs: OMIM: 618281; MGI: 2684334; HomoloGene: 18238; GeneCards: VWA2; OMA:VWA2 - orthologs

Gene location (Human)
Chr.	Chromosome 10 (human)
Band	10q25.3	Start	114,239,254 bp
Band	10q25.3	End	114,294,489 bp

Gene location (Mouse)
Chr.	Chromosome 19 (mouse)
Band	19|19 D2	Start	56,862,681 bp
Band	19|19 D2	End	56,900,510 bp
RNA expression pattern
Bgee	Human / Mouse (ortholog); Top expressed in: thymus; right uterine tube; olfactory zone of nasal mucosa; sural nerve; testicle; body of stomach; fundus; skin of abdomen; body of pancreas; skin of leg / Top expressed in: otic vesicle; molar; secondary oocyte; primary oocyte; lip; tail of embryo; proximal tubule; genital tubercle; cervix; pulmonary alveolar epithelium; More reference expression data
BioGPS	n/a
Gene ontology
Molecular function	protein binding; identical protein binding; calcium ion binding
Cellular component	extracellular region; basement membrane; extracellular exosome; extracellular space; extracellular matrix; collagen-containing extracellular matrix
Biological process	calcium-independent cell-matrix adhesion; protein homooligomerization; regulation of insulin receptor signaling pathway; growth plate cartilage chondrocyte morphogenesis
Sources:Amigo / QuickGO
Orthologs
Species	Human	Mouse
Entrez	340706	240675
Ensembl	ENSG00000165816	ENSMUSG00000025082
UniProt	Q5GFL6	Q70UZ7
RefSeq (mRNA)	NM_001272046; NM_198496; NM_001320804	NM_172840
RefSeq (protein)	NP_001258975; NP_001307733	NP_766428
Location (UCSC)	Chr 10: 114.24 – 114.29 Mb	Chr 19: 56.86 – 56.9 Mb
PubMed search
- Wikidata
View/Edit Human	View/Edit Mouse

von Willebrand factor A domain-containing protein 2, also known as A domain-containing protein similar to matrilin and collagen (AMACO), is a protein that in humans is encoded by the VWA2 gene.

AMACO is a member of the von Willebrand factor A-like (VWA) domain containing protein superfamily and consists of three VWA-like domains, two EGF-like domains, a cysteine-rich domain and a unique C-terminal domain. AMACO is an extracellular matrix protein and mostly deposited adjacent to basement membranes.

AMACO binds directly to FRAS1 which is part of the Fraser complex important for epithelial-connective tissue interaction, the exact biological role of AMACO, however, is still unknown. In 2005 AMACO was found markedly induced in colon cancers; indicating that it might be a good candidate as a biomarker for this type of cancer.
