= Quebec platelet disorder =

- Other names: Factor V Quebec
- Autosomal dominant is the manner of inheritance of this condition

Quebec platelet disorder (QPD) is a rare autosomal dominant bleeding disorder first described in a family from the province of Quebec, Canada. The disorder is characterized by large amounts of the fibrinolytic enzyme urokinase-type plasminogen activator (uPA) in platelets. This causes accelerated fibrinolysis (blood clot breakdown) which can result in bleeding.

== Signs and symptoms ==
Individuals with QPD are at risk for experiencing a number of bleeding symptoms, including joint bleeds, hematuria, and large bruising.

== Pathophysiology ==
The disorder is characterized by large amounts of uPA in platelets. Consequently, stored platelet plasminogen is converted to plasmin, which is thought to play a role in degrading a number of proteins stored in platelet α-granules. These proteins include platelet factor V, von Willebrand factor, fibrinogen, thrombospondin-1, and osteonectin. There is also a quantitative deficiency in the platelet protein multimerin 1 (MMRN1). Furthermore, upon QPD platelet activation, uPA can be released into forming clots and accelerate clot lysis, resulting in delayed-onset bleeding (12-24hrs after injury).

In 2010, the genetic cause of QPD was determined as a mutation involving an extra copy of the gene encoding uPA. The mutation causes overproduction of uPA, an enzyme that accelerates blood clot breakdown.

== Diagnosis ==
Genetic testing is the only way to definitively diagnose QPD, as most other tests cannot confirm this diagnosis. Methods include polymerase chain reaction or Southern blotting for the genetic sequence, or assays for platelet uPA levels or platelet granules.

== Treatment ==
Bleeding episodes are treated using antifibrinolytic medication, particularly tranexamic acid, to prevent fibrinolysis.

== History ==
The discovery was made by a team of doctors at McMaster University led by Dr. Catherine Hayward, a hematologist.
