= Matrilin =

Protein family

Matrilins are proteoglycan-associated proteins that are major components of extracellular matrix of various tissues. They include:

- Matrilin-1
- Matrilin-2
- Matrilin-3
- Matrilin-4

Matrilin-1 and -3 are expressed near exclusively in skeletal tissues. Matrilin-2 and -4 have a much broader distribution and are also found in loose connective tissue.
