= PND =

PND may refer to:

== Medicine ==
- Paroxysmal nocturnal dyspnoea, a breathing disorder
- Post-nasal drip, from the nose

== Politics ==
- New Democracy Party (Portugal) (Partido da Nova Democracia)
- National Democratic Party (Djibouti) (Parti National Démocratique)
- Democratic Nationalist Party (Romania), dissolved

== Transport ==
- Pending LRT station (LRT station abbreviation), Bukit Panjang, Singapore
- Punta Gorda Airport (IATA code), Belize

== Other uses ==
- PartyNextDoor, Canadian singer
- Penalty Notice for Disorder, UK fine for anti-social offences
- Personal navigation device or personal navigation assistant
- Personennamendatei (Name Authority File)
- Pitcairn Islands dollar
- Police National Database, UK

== See also ==
- PNDS (disambiguation)
