= Prickle =

Prickle may refer to:

- Thorns, spines, and prickles, a sharp, needle-like structures
- Prickle cell of the skin
- Prickle (protein), a planar cell polarity protein
- The collective noun for a pack of porcupines
- Prickle (Gumby character), a character on The Gumby Show
