= Matrilin-2 =

Protein-coding gene in the species Homo sapiens

MATN2

Identifiers
- Aliases: MATN2, matrilin 2
- External IDs: OMIM: 602108; MGI: 109613; GeneCards: MATN2

Gene location (Human)
Chr.	Chromosome 8 (human)
Band	8q22.1-q22.2	Start	97,868,840 bp
Band	8q22.1-q22.2	End	98,036,724 bp

Gene location (Mouse)
Chr.	Chromosome 15 (mouse)
Band	15|15 B3.1	Start	34,306,823 bp
Band	15|15 B3.1	End	34,436,419 bp
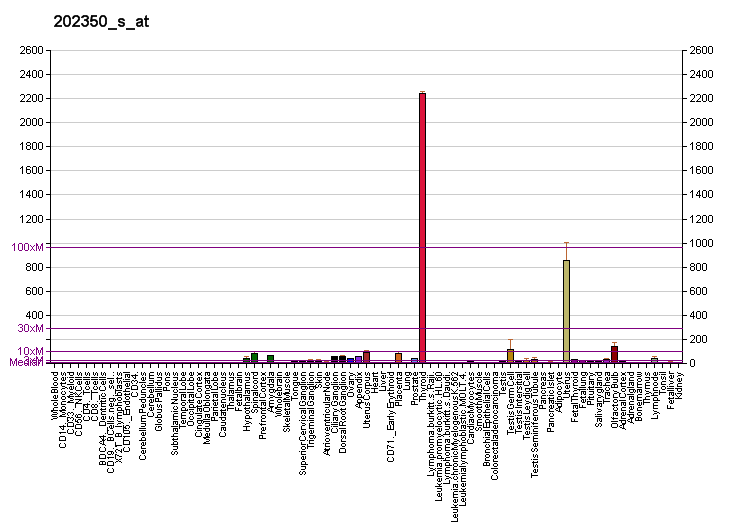
RNA expression pattern
Bgee	Human / Mouse (ortholog); Top expressed in: tibia; trigeminal ganglion; spinal ganglia; seminal vesicula; canal of the cervix; Achilles tendon; tail of epididymis; thyroid gland; right ovary; left lobe of thyroid gland / Top expressed in: external carotid artery; efferent ductule; vas deferens; sciatic nerve; internal carotid artery; seminal vesicula; Gonadal ridge; tunica adventitia of aorta; cervix; decidua; More reference expression data
BioGPS	More reference expression data
Gene ontology
Molecular function	calcium ion binding; protein binding; molecular function; extracellular matrix structural constituent
Cellular component	extracellular region; basement membrane; extracellular matrix; extracellular space; collagen-containing extracellular matrix
Biological process	glial cell migration; dendrite regeneration; axon guidance; neuron migration; response to axon injury; neuron projection development; biological process; growth plate cartilage chondrocyte morphogenesis
Sources:Amigo / QuickGO
Orthologs
Databases	NCBI: entry; OMA: entry
Species	Human	Mouse
Entrez	4147	17181
Ensembl	ENSG00000132561	ENSMUSG00000022324
UniProt	O00339	Q3TQ80
RefSeq (mRNA)	NM_002380; NM_030583; NM_001317748	NM_016762; NM_001358780
RefSeq (protein)	NP_001304677; NP_002371; NP_085072	NP_058042; NP_001345709
Location (UCSC)	Chr 8: 97.87 – 98.04 Mb	Chr 15: 34.31 – 34.44 Mb
PubMed search
- Wikidata
View/Edit Human	View/Edit Mouse

Matrilin-2 is a matrilin protein that in humans is encoded by the MATN2 gene.

This gene encodes a member of the von Willebrand factor A domain containing protein family. This family of proteins is thought to be involved in the formation of filamentous networks in the extracellular matrices of various tissues. This protein contains five von Willebrand factor A domains. The specific function of this gene has not yet been determined. Two transcript variants encoding different isoforms have been found for this gene.
