= CELSR2 =

Protein-coding gene in humans

Identifiers
- Aliases: CELSR2, CDHF10, EGFL2, Flamingo1, MEGF3, ADGRC2, cadherin EGF LAG seven-pass G-type receptor 2
- External IDs: OMIM: 604265; MGI: 1858235; GeneCards: CELSR2

Gene location (Human)
Chr.	Chromosome 1 (human)
Band	1p13.3	Start	109,249,539 bp
Band	1p13.3	End	109,275,751 bp

Gene location (Mouse)
Chr.	Chromosome 3 (mouse)
Band	3 F3|3 47.02 cM	Start	108,298,167 bp
Band	3 F3|3 47.02 cM	End	108,323,383 bp
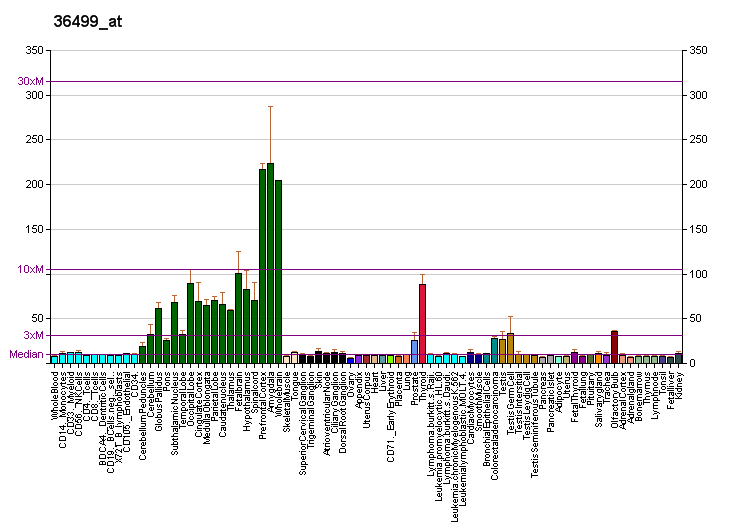

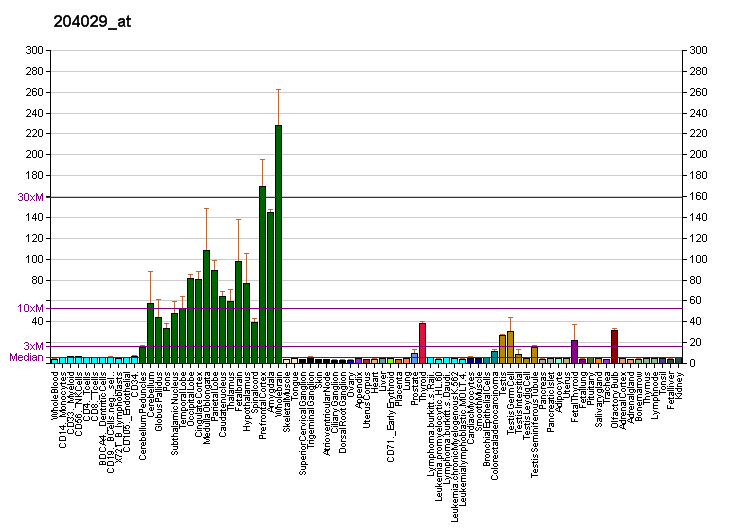
RNA expression pattern
Bgee	Human / Mouse (ortholog); Top expressed in: ganglionic eminence; ventricular zone; right frontal lobe; prefrontal cortex; primary visual cortex; hippocampus proper; postcentral gyrus; C1 segment; Brodmann area 9; superior frontal gyrus / Top expressed in: superior surface of tongue; gallbladder; lip; subiculum; superior frontal gyrus; visual cortex; motor neuron; ascending aorta; primary visual cortex; extensor digitorum longus muscle; More reference expression data
BioGPS	More reference expression data
Gene ontology
Molecular function	G protein-coupled receptor activity; signal transducer activity; calcium ion binding; transmembrane signaling receptor activity
Cellular component	integral component of membrane; plasma membrane; membrane; cytoplasm
Biological process	homophilic cell adhesion via plasma membrane adhesion molecules; regulation of transcription, DNA-templated; cell surface receptor signaling pathway; multicellular organism development; regulation of cell-cell adhesion; Wnt signaling pathway, planar cell polarity pathway; G protein-coupled receptor signaling pathway; signal transduction; neural plate anterior/posterior regionalization; Wnt signaling pathway; cell adhesion; dendrite morphogenesis; cell-cell adhesion
Sources:Amigo / QuickGO
Orthologs
Databases	NCBI: entry; OMA: entry
Species	Human	Mouse
Entrez	1952	53883
Ensembl	ENSG00000143126	ENSMUSG00000068740
UniProt	Q9HCU4	Q9R0M0
RefSeq (mRNA)	NM_001408	NM_001004177; NM_017392
RefSeq (protein)	NP_001399	NP_001004177; NP_059088
Location (UCSC)	Chr 1: 109.25 – 109.28 Mb	Chr 3: 108.3 – 108.32 Mb
PubMed search
- Wikidata
View/Edit Human	View/Edit Mouse

Cadherin EGF LAG seven-pass G-type receptor 2 is a protein that in humans is encoded by the CELSR2 gene.

The protein encoded by this gene is a member of the flamingo subfamily, part of the cadherin superfamily. The flamingo subfamily consists of nonclassic-type cadherins; a subpopulation that does not interact with catenins. The flamingo cadherins are located at the plasma membrane and have nine cadherin domains, seven epidermal growth factor-like repeats and two laminin A G-type repeats in their ectodomain. They also have seven transmembrane domains, a characteristic unique to this subfamily. It is postulated that these proteins are receptors involved in contact-mediated communication, with cadherin domains acting as homophilic binding regions and the EGF-like domains involved in cell adhesion and receptor-ligand interactions. The specific function of this particular member has not been determined.

== See also ==
- Flamingo (protein)
