= TMEFF2 =

Protein-coding gene in the species Homo sapiens

Identifiers
- Aliases: TMEFF2, CT120.2, HPP1, TENB2, TPEF, TR, TR-2, transmembrane protein with EGF like and two follistatin like domains 2
- External IDs: OMIM: 605734; MGI: 1861735; GeneCards: TMEFF2
Available structures
PDB	Ortholog search: PDBe RCSB
PDB	List of PDB id codes 2FMW

Gene location (Human)
Chr.	Chromosome 2 (human)
Band	2q32.3	Start	191,949,043 bp
Band	2q32.3	End	192,194,933 bp

Gene location (Mouse)
Chr.	Chromosome 1 (mouse)
Band	1|1 C1.1	Start	50,939,806 bp
Band	1|1 C1.1	End	51,226,429 bp
RNA expression pattern
Bgee	Human / Mouse (ortholog); Top expressed in: middle temporal gyrus; Brodmann area 46; spinal ganglia; Brodmann area 23; thalamus; pars reticulata; entorhinal cortex; corpus callosum; subthalamic nucleus; endothelial cell / Top expressed in: anterior horn of spinal cord; facial motor nucleus; anterior amygdaloid area; supraoptic nucleus; optic nerve; habenula; lateral hypothalamus; ventral tegmental area; globus pallidus; deep cerebellar nuclei; More reference expression data
BioGPS	n/a
Gene ontology
Molecular function	molecular function
Cellular component	integral component of membrane; extracellular region; membrane; plasma membrane
Biological process	negative regulation of integrin biosynthetic process; negative regulation of cell migration; negative regulation of stress fiber assembly; wound healing, spreading of cells; animal organ morphogenesis; tissue development
Sources:Amigo / QuickGO
Orthologs
Databases	NCBI: entry; OMA: entry
Species	Human	Mouse
Entrez	23671	56363
Ensembl	ENSG00000144339	ENSMUSG00000026109
UniProt	Q9UIK5	Q9QYM9
RefSeq (mRNA)	NM_001305134; NM_001305145; NM_016192	NM_019790
RefSeq (protein)	NP_001292063; NP_001292074; NP_057276	NP_062764
Location (UCSC)	Chr 2: 191.95 – 192.19 Mb	Chr 1: 50.94 – 51.23 Mb
PubMed search
- Wikidata
View/Edit Human	View/Edit Mouse

The Transmembrane protein with an EGF-like and two follistatin-like domains 2 (TMEFF2) gene is located on chromosome 2q32-q33 and encodes a 374-residue long single polypeptide, type-I transmembrane proteoglycan. According to the HUGO gene nomenclature committee, the aliases of TMEFF2 include, HPP1, Tomoregulin (TR), Transmembrane protein TENB2 (TENB2), Cancer/testis antigen family 120, member 2 (CT120.2) and Transmembrane protein containing EGF and follistatin domains (TPEF). TMEFF2 was identified and characterized by at least five independent groups within the time span of approximately a year.

TMEFF2 is proteolytically shed from the cell surface. The reported functions of TMEFF2 span across a wide range of physiological and pathological spectra including metabolism, neuroprotection, apoptosis, embryonic development, onco-suppression and endocrine function. TMEFF2 promoter and its 5′-upstream CpG island are methylated in a number of cancers. An inverse correlation between TMEFF2 methylation and the stage, response to therapy and survival outcome has been observed. The detection of methylated free-circulating TMEFF2 DNA has been suggested as a potential diagnostic tool for colorectal cancer. The TMEFF2 downregulation signature equals and sometimes outperforms the Gleason and pathological scores in prostate cancer. TMEFF2 is downregulated in glioma and cotricotropinomas, and it impairs the production of adrenocorticotropic hormone in glioma cells. Through binding the amyloid β protein, its precursor and derivatives, TMEFF2 provides neuroprotection in Alzheimer's disease.

TMEFF2 is a multidomain protein with its N-terminus harbouring a signal peptide followed by two follistatin-like domains, an EGF (epidermal growth factor)-like domain, a transmembrane portion and a short intracellular domain. The EGF-like domain of TMEFF2 appears to be functionally ineffective because of the substitution of a crucial arginine residue (Arg39) with histidine, whereas the follistatin-like domains are reported to be crucial for the relevant functions of TMEFF2 .
