= Multimerin 1 =

Protein-coding gene in the species Homo sapiens

MMRN1

Identifiers
- Aliases: MMRN1, ECM, EMILIN4, GPIa*, MMRN, multimerin 1
- External IDs: OMIM: 601456; MGI: 1918195; GeneCards: MMRN1

Gene location (Human)
Chr.	Chromosome 4 (human)
Band	4q22.1	Start	89,879,532 bp
Band	4q22.1	End	89,954,629 bp

Gene location (Mouse)
Chr.	Chromosome 6 (mouse)
Band	6 B3|6 29.22 cM	Start	60,901,960 bp
Band	6 B3|6 29.22 cM	End	60,966,362 bp
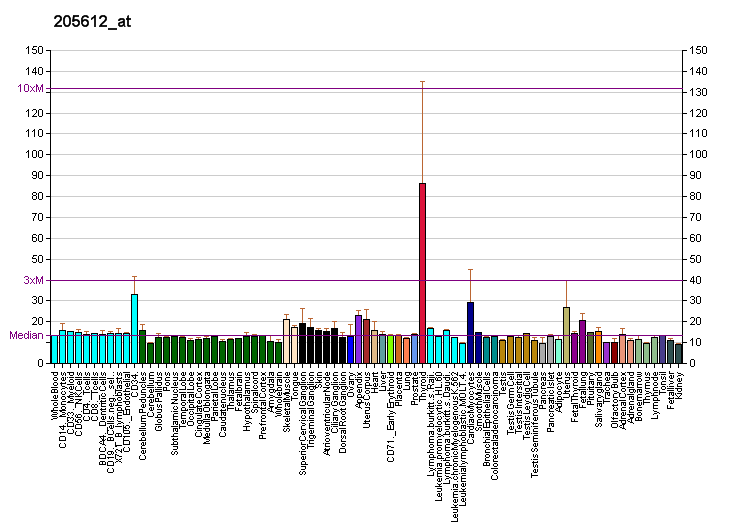
RNA expression pattern
Bgee	Human / Mouse (ortholog); Top expressed in: pericardium; right lobe of thyroid gland; left uterine tube; gallbladder; left lobe of thyroid gland; testicle; decidua; ectocervix; Achilles tendon; canal of the cervix / Top expressed in: carotid body; Paneth cell; blood; gastrula; intercostal muscle; dermis; esophagus; conjunctival fornix; proximal straight tubule; skin of abdomen; More reference expression data
BioGPS	More reference expression data
Gene ontology
Molecular function	protein binding; calcium ion binding; extracellular matrix structural constituent
Cellular component	extracellular region; platelet alpha granule lumen; extracellular matrix; collagen-containing extracellular matrix
Biological process	platelet degranulation; cell adhesion; blood coagulation; positive regulation of cell-substrate adhesion
Sources:Amigo / QuickGO
Orthologs
Databases	NCBI: entry; OMA: entry
Species	Human	Mouse
Entrez	22915	70945
Ensembl	ENSG00000138722	ENSMUSG00000054641
UniProt	Q13201	B2RPV6
RefSeq (mRNA)	NM_007351; NM_001371403	NM_001163507; NM_027613
RefSeq (protein)	NP_031377; NP_001358332	NP_001156979; NP_081889
Location (UCSC)	Chr 4: 89.88 – 89.95 Mb	Chr 6: 60.9 – 60.97 Mb
PubMed search
- Wikidata
View/Edit Human	View/Edit Mouse

Multimerin 1, also known as elastin microfibril interfacer 4 (EMILIN-4), is a protein that, in humans, is encoded by the MMRN1 gene.

Multimerin is a massive, soluble protein found in platelets and in the endothelium of blood vessels. It is composed of subunits linked by interchain disulfide bonds to form large, variably sized homomultimers. Multimerin is a factor V/Va-binding protein and may function as a carrier protein for platelet factor V. It may also have functions as an extracellular matrix or adhesive protein. Recently, patients with an unusual autosomal-dominant bleeding disorder (factor V Quebec/Quebec Platelet Disorder) were found to have a deficiency of platelet multimerin.
