= CELSR1 =

Protein-coding gene in humans

Identifiers
- Aliases: CELSR1, CDHF9, FMI2, HFMI2, ME2, ADGRC1, cadherin EGF LAG seven-pass G-type receptor 1, LMPHM9
- External IDs: OMIM: 604523; MGI: 1100883; GeneCards: CELSR1

Gene location (Human)
| Chr. | Chromosome 22 (human) |
| Band | 22q13.31 | Start | 46,360,834 bp |
| Band | 22q13.31 | End | 46,537,620 bp |

Gene location (Mouse)
| Chr. | Chromosome 15 (mouse) |
| Band | 15 E2|15 40.42 cM | Start | 85,783,130 bp |
| Band | 15 E2|15 40.42 cM | End | 85,918,404 bp |
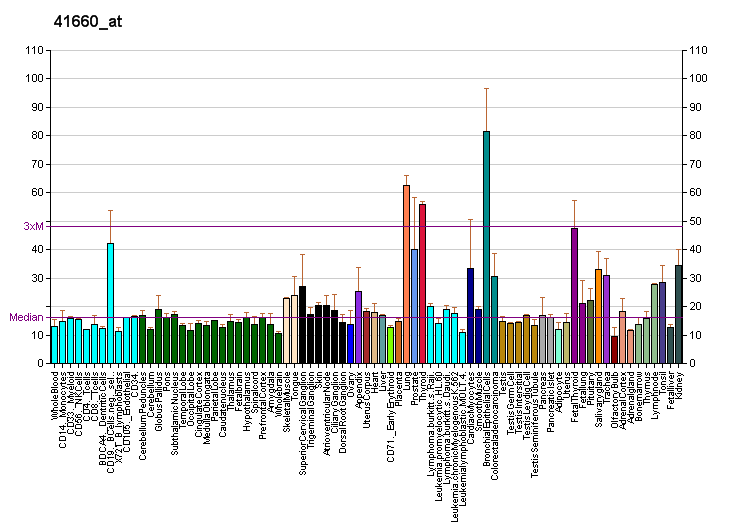

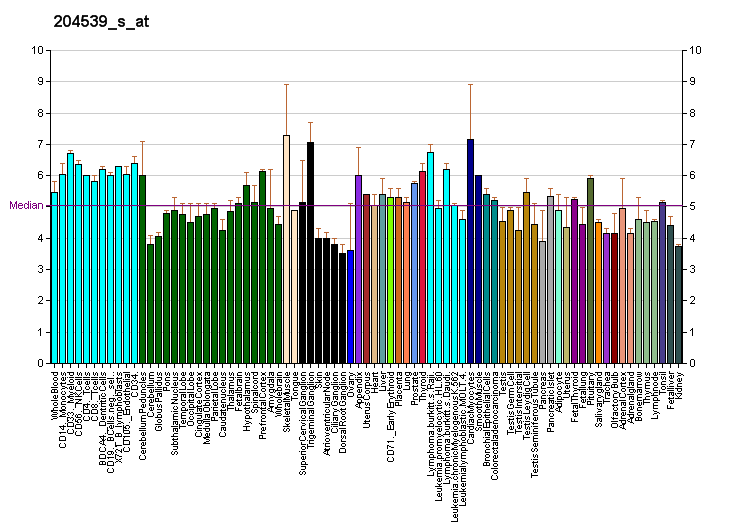

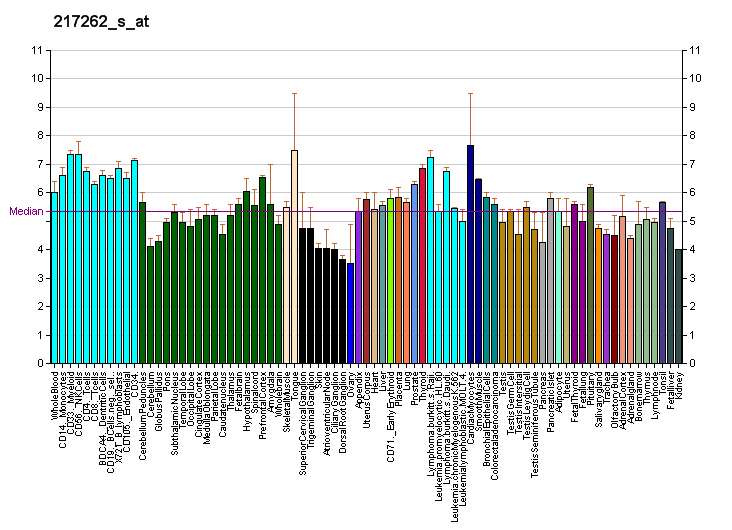
RNA expression pattern
| Bgee | Human / Mouse (ortholog); Top expressed in: ventricular zone; bronchial epithelial cell; right uterine tube; olfactory zone of nasal mucosa; ganglionic eminence; skin of abdomen; anterior pituitary; skin of leg; secondary oocyte; mucosa of paranasal sinus / Top expressed in: ventricular zone; molar; vestibular sensory epithelium; hair follicle; lip; medullary collecting duct; skin of external ear; tail of embryo; secondary oocyte; primary oocyte; More reference expression data |
| BioGPS | More reference expression data |
Gene ontology
| Molecular function | calcium ion binding; G protein-coupled receptor activity; protein dimerization activity; signal transducer activity; transmembrane signaling receptor activity |
| Cellular component | integral component of membrane; membrane; plasma membrane; integral component of plasma membrane; nucleoplasm |
| Biological process | hair follicle development; planar dichotomous subdivision of terminal units involved in lung branching morphogenesis; G protein-coupled receptor signaling pathway; lateral sprouting involved in lung morphogenesis; regulation of actin cytoskeleton organization; locomotory behavior; orthogonal dichotomous subdivision of terminal units involved in lung branching morphogenesis; establishment of planar polarity of embryonic epithelium; establishment of planar polarity; wound healing; neuron migration; establishment of body hair planar orientation; planar cell polarity pathway involved in neural tube closure; multicellular organism development; Wnt signaling pathway, planar cell polarity pathway; central nervous system development; cell surface receptor signaling pathway; neural tube closure; cell adhesion; inner ear morphogenesis; apical protein localization; Rho protein signal transduction; anterior/posterior pattern specification; signal transduction; homophilic cell adhesion via plasma membrane adhesion molecules; protein localization involved in establishment of planar polarity; cell-cell adhesion |
Sources:Amigo / QuickGO
Orthologs
| Databases | NCBI: entry; OMA: entry |
| Species | Human | Mouse |
| Entrez | 9620 | 12614 |
| Ensembl | ENSG00000075275 | ENSMUSG00000016028 |
| UniProt | Q9NYQ6 | O35161 |
| RefSeq (mRNA) | NM_014246; NM_001378328 | NM_009886 |
| RefSeq (protein) | NP_055061; NP_001365257 | NP_034016 |
| Location (UCSC) | Chr 22: 46.36 – 46.54 Mb | Chr 15: 85.78 – 85.92 Mb |
| PubMed search |
- Wikidata
| View/Edit Human | View/Edit Mouse |

Cadherin EGF LAG seven-pass G-type receptor 1, also known as flamingo homolog 2 or cadherin family member 9, is a protein that in humans is encoded by the CELSR1 gene.

== Function ==
The protein encoded by this gene is a member of the flamingo subfamily, part of the cadherin superfamily. The flamingo subfamily consists of nonclassic-type cadherins; a subpopulation that does not interact with catenins. The flamingo cadherins are located at the plasma membrane and have nine cadherin domains, seven epidermal growth factor-like repeats and two laminin G-like domains in their ectodomain. They also have seven transmembrane domains, a characteristic unique to this subfamily. It is postulated that these proteins are receptors involved in contact-mediated communication, with cadherin domains acting as homophilic binding regions and the EGF-like domains involved in cell adhesion and receptor-ligand interactions. This particular member is a developmentally regulated, neural-specific gene which plays an unspecified role in early embryogenesis.

== See also ==
- Flamingo (protein)
