= CELSR3 =

Protein-coding gene in the species Homo sapiens

Identifiers
- Aliases: CELSR3, CDHF11, EGFL1, FMI1, HFMI1, MEGF2, RESDA1, ADGRC3, cadherin EGF LAG seven-pass G-type receptor 3
- External IDs: OMIM: 604264; MGI: 1858236; GeneCards: CELSR3

Gene location (Human)
Chr.	Chromosome 3 (human)
Band	3p21.31	Start	48,636,463 bp
Band	3p21.31	End	48,662,886 bp

Gene location (Mouse)
Chr.	Chromosome 9 (mouse)
Band	9|9 F2	Start	108,703,519 bp
Band	9|9 F2	End	108,730,168 bp
RNA expression pattern
Bgee	Human / Mouse (ortholog); Top expressed in: right hemisphere of cerebellum; ganglionic eminence; pituitary gland; paraflocculus of cerebellum; Brodmann area 10; cerebellar vermis; anterior pituitary; right frontal lobe; postcentral gyrus; Region I of hippocampus proper / Top expressed in: cerebellar cortex; hypothalamus; olfactory bulb; ganglionic eminence; primary visual cortex; superior frontal gyrus; striatum of neuraxis; granulocyte; layer of retina; neural layer of retina; More reference expression data
BioGPS	n/a
Gene ontology
Molecular function	calcium ion binding; G protein-coupled receptor activity; signal transducer activity; protein binding; transmembrane signaling receptor activity
Cellular component	integral component of membrane; membrane; plasma membrane
Biological process	regulation of protein phosphorylation; dopaminergic neuron axon guidance; G protein-coupled receptor signaling pathway; serotonergic neuron axon guidance; neuron migration; regulation of protein localization; multicellular organism development; Wnt signaling pathway, planar cell polarity pathway; cell surface receptor signaling pathway; cell adhesion; axonal fasciculation; signal transduction; homophilic cell adhesion via plasma membrane adhesion molecules; planar cell polarity pathway involved in axon guidance; cilium assembly; cell-cell adhesion
Sources:Amigo / QuickGO
Orthologs
Databases	NCBI: entry; OMA: entry
Species	Human	Mouse
Entrez	1951	107934
Ensembl	ENSG00000008300	ENSMUSG00000023473
UniProt	Q9NYQ7	Q91ZI0
RefSeq (mRNA)	NM_001407	NM_080437; NM_001359572; NM_001359573
RefSeq (protein)	NP_001398	NP_536685; NP_001346501; NP_001346502
Location (UCSC)	Chr 3: 48.64 – 48.66 Mb	Chr 9: 108.7 – 108.73 Mb
PubMed search
- Wikidata
View/Edit Human	View/Edit Mouse

Cadherin EGF LAG seven-pass G-type receptor 3 is a protein that in humans is encoded by the CELSR3 gene.

The protein encoded by this gene is a member of the flamingo subfamily, part of the cadherin superfamily. The flamingo subfamily consists of nonclassic-type cadherins; a subpopulation that does not interact with catenins. The flamingo cadherins are located at the plasma membrane and have nine cadherin domains, seven epidermal growth factor-like repeats and two laminin A G-type repeats in their ectodomain. They also have seven transmembrane domains, a characteristic unique to this subfamily. It is postulated that these proteins are receptors involved in contact-mediated communication, with cadherin domains acting as homophilic binding regions and the EGF-like domains involved in cell adhesion and receptor-ligand interactions. The specific function of this particular member has not been determined.

== See also ==
- Flamingo (protein)
