= HABP2 =

Mammalian protein found in Homo sapiens

Identifiers
- Aliases: HABP2, FSAP, HABP, HGFAL, PHBP, NMTC5, hyaluronan binding protein 2
- External IDs: OMIM: 603924; MGI: 1196378; GeneCards: HABP2

Gene location (Human)
Chr.	Chromosome 10 (human)
Band	10q25.3	Start	113,550,837 bp
Band	10q25.3	End	113,589,602 bp

Gene location (Mouse)
Chr.	Chromosome 19 (mouse)
Band	19|19 D2	Start	56,275,569 bp
Band	19|19 D2	End	56,309,254 bp
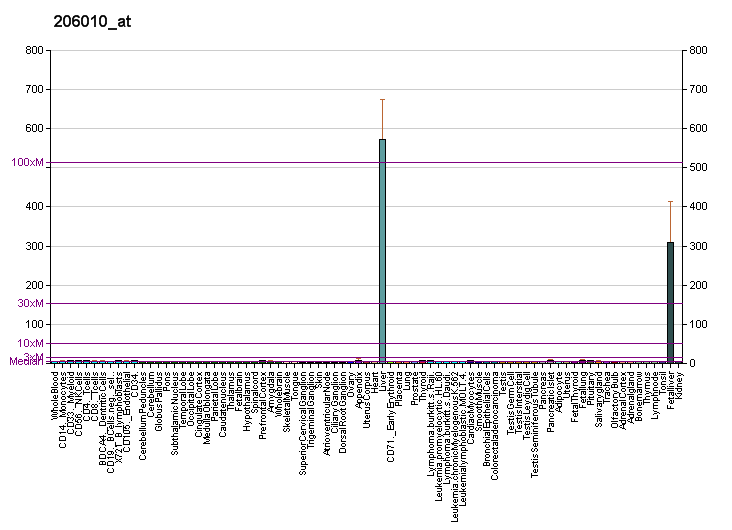
RNA expression pattern
Bgee	Human / Mouse (ortholog); Top expressed in: right lobe of liver; pancreatic ductal cell; gallbladder; oocyte; secondary oocyte; body of pancreas; islet of Langerhans; human kidney; gonad; muscle of thigh / Top expressed in: right kidney; yolk sac; crypt of lieberkuhn of small intestine; liver; human kidney; left lobe of liver; proximal tubule; stomach; epithelium of stomach; muscle of thigh; More reference expression data
BioGPS	More reference expression data
Gene ontology
Molecular function	peptidase activity; glycosaminoglycan binding; serine-type peptidase activity; hydrolase activity; calcium ion binding; serine-type endopeptidase activity
Cellular component	extracellular region; extracellular space
Biological process	cell adhesion; proteolysis
Sources:Amigo / QuickGO
Orthologs
Databases	NCBI: entry; OMA: entry
Species	Human	Mouse
Entrez	3026	226243
Ensembl	ENSG00000148702	ENSMUSG00000025075
UniProt	Q14520	Q8K0D2
RefSeq (mRNA)	NM_004132; NM_001177660	NM_146101; NM_001329935; NM_001329936
RefSeq (protein)	NP_001171131; NP_004123	NP_001316864; NP_001316865; NP_666213
Location (UCSC)	Chr 10: 113.55 – 113.59 Mb	Chr 19: 56.28 – 56.31 Mb
PubMed search
- Wikidata
View/Edit Human	View/Edit Mouse

Hyaluronan-binding protein 2 also known as factor VII activating protease (FSAP) is a protein that in humans is encoded by the HABP2 gene.

The protein encoded by this gene is an extracellular serine protease which binds hyaluronic acid. It is involved in cell adhesion. The protein is synthesized as a single chain, but then undergoes an autoproteolytic event to form the functional heterodimer. Further autoproteolysis leads to smaller, inactive peptides. Two transcript variants utilizing alternative polyA sites exist for this gene.
