= Hemicentin 1 =

Protein found in humans

HMCN1

Identifiers
- Aliases: HMCN1, ARMD1, FBLN6, FIBL-6, FIBL6, hemicentin 1
- External IDs: OMIM: 608548; MGI: 2685047; GeneCards: HMCN1

Gene location (Human)
Chr.	Chromosome 1 (human)
Band	1q25.3-q31.1	Start	185,734,391 bp
Band	1q25.3-q31.1	End	186,190,949 bp

Gene location (Mouse)
Chr.	Chromosome 1 (mouse)
Band	1|1 G1	Start	150,438,275 bp
Band	1|1 G1	End	150,869,186 bp
RNA expression pattern
Bgee	Human / Mouse (ortholog); Top expressed in: Descending thoracic aorta; ascending aorta; visceral pleura; right coronary artery; skin of hip; left coronary artery; synovial membrane; synovial joint; cardiac muscle tissue of right atrium; right lung / Top expressed in: hand; atrium; Gonadal ridge; atrioventricular valve; external carotid artery; vas deferens; dermis; vestibular membrane of cochlear duct; condyle; lung; More reference expression data
BioGPS	n/a
Gene ontology
Molecular function	calcium ion binding; extracellular matrix structural constituent; signaling receptor activity; protein homodimerization activity; cell adhesion molecule binding
Cellular component	extracellular matrix; extracellular region; basement membrane; cell junction; cell cortex; extracellular exosome; cytoplasm; cleavage furrow; collagen-containing extracellular matrix
Biological process	response to stimulus; visual perception; cell cycle; cell division; homophilic cell adhesion via plasma membrane adhesion molecules; heterophilic cell-cell adhesion via plasma membrane cell adhesion molecules; response to bacterium
Sources:Amigo / QuickGO
Orthologs
Databases	NCBI: entry; OMA: entry
Species	Human	Mouse
Entrez	83872	545370
Ensembl	ENSG00000143341	ENSMUSG00000066842
UniProt	Q96RW7	D3YXG0
RefSeq (mRNA)	NM_031935	NM_001024720
RefSeq (protein)	NP_114141	NP_001019891
Location (UCSC)	Chr 1: 185.73 – 186.19 Mb	Chr 1: 150.44 – 150.87 Mb
PubMed search
- Wikidata
View/Edit Human	View/Edit Mouse

Hemicentin-1 is a protein that in humans is encoded by the HMCN1 gene.

This gene encodes a large extracellular member of the immunoglobulin superfamily. A similar protein in C. elegans forms long, fine tracks at specific extracellular sites that are involved in many processes such as stabilization of the germline syncytium, anchorage of mechanosensory neurons to the epidermis, and organization of hemidesmosomes in the epidermis. Mutations in this gene may be associated with age-related macular degeneration.
