= LTBP1 =

Protein-coding gene in the species Homo sapiens

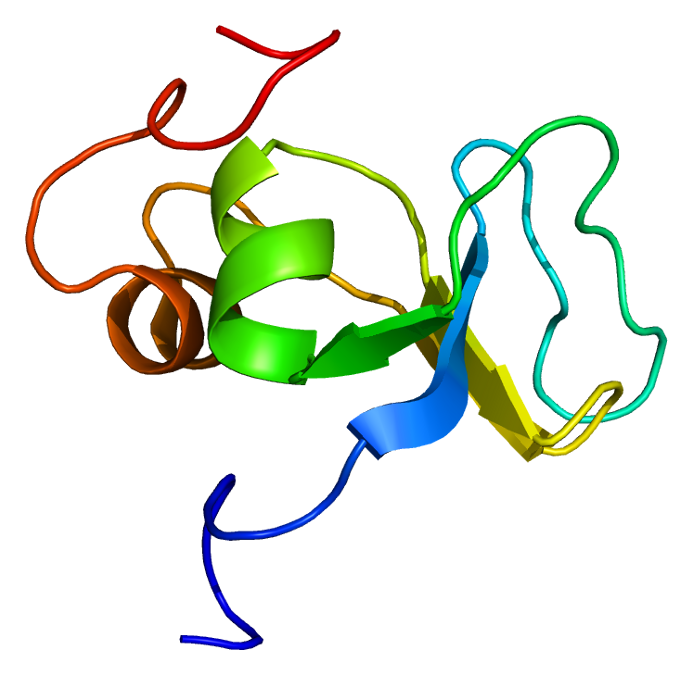
Available structures
PDB	Ortholog search: PDBe RCSB
PDB	List of PDB id codes 1KSQ

Identifiers
- Aliases: LTBP1, latent transforming growth factor beta binding protein 1
- External IDs: OMIM: 150390; MGI: 109151; HomoloGene: 522; GeneCards: LTBP1; OMA:LTBP1 - orthologs

Gene location (Human)
Chr.	Chromosome 2 (human)
Band	2p22.3	Start	32,946,953 bp
Band	2p22.3	End	33,399,509 bp

Gene location (Mouse)
Chr.	Chromosome 17 (mouse)
Band	17|17 E2	Start	75,312,563 bp
Band	17|17 E2	End	75,699,507 bp
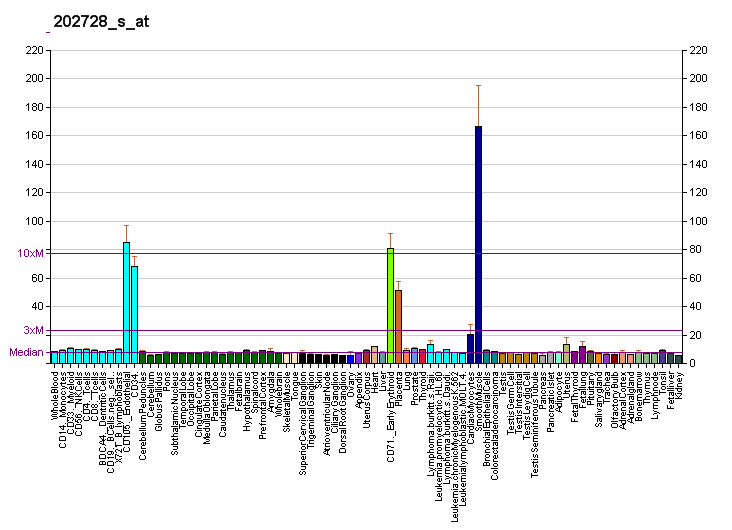

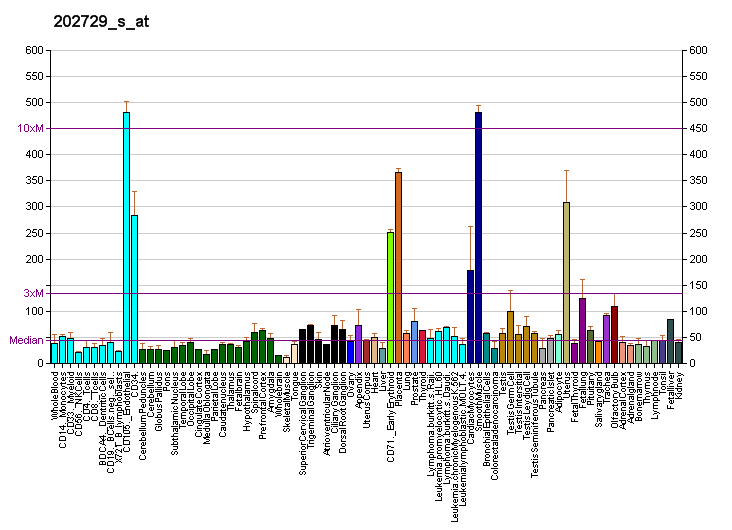
RNA expression pattern
Bgee	Human / Mouse (ortholog); Top expressed in: right coronary artery; Descending thoracic aorta; ascending aorta; saphenous vein; stromal cell of endometrium; urethra; popliteal artery; tibial arteries; ventricular zone; left coronary artery / Top expressed in: ascending aorta; cumulus cell; tunica media of zone of aorta; aortic valve; ciliary body; umbilical cord; efferent ductule; atrium; blood; human fetus; More reference expression data
BioGPS	More reference expression data
Gene ontology
Molecular function	protein binding; calcium ion binding; transforming growth factor beta-activated receptor activity; growth factor binding; microfibril binding; transforming growth factor beta binding; extracellular matrix structural constituent
Cellular component	extracellular matrix; microfibril; extracellular space; endoplasmic reticulum lumen; extracellular region; protein-containing complex; collagen-containing extracellular matrix
Biological process	ventricular septum development; sequestering of TGFbeta in extracellular matrix; coronary vasculature development; aorta development; transmembrane receptor protein serine/threonine kinase signaling pathway; post-translational protein modification; regulation of transforming growth factor beta activation
Sources:Amigo / QuickGO
Orthologs
Species	Human	Mouse
Entrez	4052	268977
Ensembl	ENSG00000049323	ENSMUSG00000001870
UniProt	Q14766	Q8CG19
RefSeq (mRNA)	NM_000627; NM_001166264; NM_001166265; NM_001166266; NM_206943	NM_019919; NM_206958; NM_001331233; NM_001331234; NM_001331235 NM_001331236; NM_001331237
RefSeq (protein)	NP_000618; NP_001159736; NP_001159737; NP_001159738; NP_996826	NP_001318162; NP_001318163; NP_001318164; NP_001318165; NP_001318166 NP_064303; NP_996841
Location (UCSC)	Chr 2: 32.95 – 33.4 Mb	Chr 17: 75.31 – 75.7 Mb
PubMed search
- Wikidata
View/Edit Human	View/Edit Mouse

Latent-transforming growth factor beta-binding protein 1 is a protein that in humans is encoded by the LTBP1 gene.

The protein encoded by this gene belongs to the family of latent TGF-beta binding proteins (LTBPs). The secretion and activation of TGF-betas is regulated by their association with latency-associated proteins and with latent TGF-beta binding proteins. The product of this gene targets latent complexes of transforming growth factor beta to the extracellular matrix, where the latent cytokine is subsequently activated by several different mechanisms. Alternatively spliced transcript variants encoding different isoforms have been identified.

== Interactions ==
LTBP1 (gene) has been shown to interact with TGF beta 1.
