= Strabismus (protein) =

vang-like 1 (van gogh, Drosophila)

Identifiers
- Symbol: VANGL1
- NCBI gene: 81839
- OMIM: 610132

Strabismus was originally identified as a Drosophila protein involved in planar cell polarity. Flies with mutated strabismus genes have altered development of ommatidia in their eyes. Vertebrates have two Strabismus-related proteins, VANGL1 and VANGL2 (an alternate name for the Drosophila "Strabismus" protein is "Van Gogh").

The amino acid sequence and localization studies for Strabismus indicate that it is a membrane protein. Prickle is another protein in the planar cell polarity signaling pathway. Prickle is recruited to the cell surface membrane by strabismus. In cells of the developing Drosophila wing, Prickle and Strabismus are concentrated at the cell surface membrane on the most proximal side of cells.

== Vertebrate cell movement ==
vang-like 2 (van gogh, Drosophila)

Identifiers
- Symbol: VANGL2
- NCBI gene: 57216
- OMIM: 600533

VANGL2 is involved in the migration of groups of cells during vertebrate embryogenesis.

== Humans ==
In humans, mutations in VANGL1 have been associated with neural tube defects including spina bifida, and with some forms of cancer including hepatocellular carcinoma.
