= DNER =

Protein-coding gene in the species Homo sapiens

Identifiers
- Aliases: DNER, UNQ26, bet, delta/notch like EGF repeat containing
- External IDs: OMIM: 607299; MGI: 2152889; GeneCards: DNER

Gene location (Human)
Chr.	Chromosome 2 (human)
Band	2q36.3	Start	229,357,629 bp
Band	2q36.3	End	229,714,555 bp

Gene location (Mouse)
Chr.	Chromosome 1 (mouse)
Band	1|1 C5	Start	84,347,560 bp
Band	1|1 C5	End	84,673,942 bp
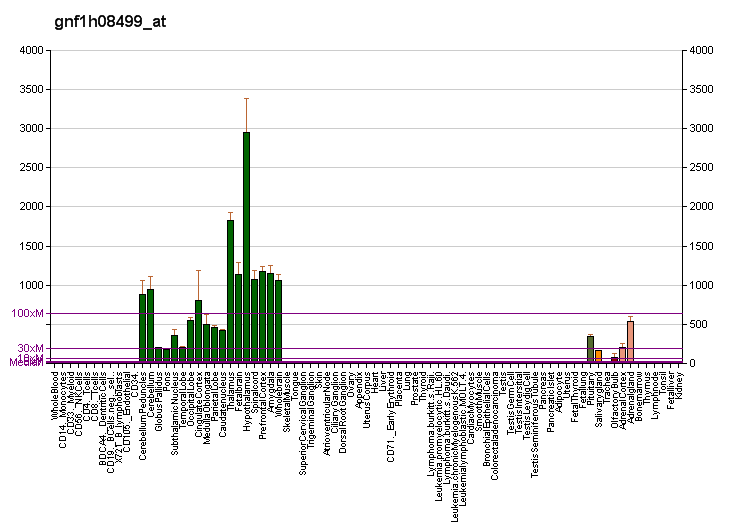
RNA expression pattern
Bgee	Human / Mouse (ortholog); Top expressed in: lateral nuclear group of thalamus; cerebellar vermis; pars reticulata; pars compacta; parotid gland; subthalamic nucleus; external globus pallidus; inferior ganglion of vagus nerve; superior vestibular nucleus; internal globus pallidus / Top expressed in: lobe of cerebellum; cerebellar vermis; ventromedial nucleus; barrel cortex; piriform cortex; habenula; mammillary body; ventral tegmental area; deep cerebellar nuclei; substantia nigra; More reference expression data
BioGPS	More reference expression data
Gene ontology
Molecular function	clathrin binding; calcium ion binding; protein binding; transmembrane signaling receptor activity; Notch binding
Cellular component	integral component of membrane; soma; plasma membrane; dendrite; early endosome; membrane
Biological process	Notch receptor processing; synapse assembly; central nervous system development; neuron migration; endocytosis; glial cell differentiation; skeletal muscle fiber development; Notch signaling pathway
Sources:Amigo / QuickGO
Orthologs
Databases	NCBI: entry; OMA: entry
Species	Human	Mouse
Entrez	92737	227325
Ensembl	ENSG00000187957	ENSMUSG00000036766
UniProt	Q8NFT8	Q8JZM4
RefSeq (mRNA)	NM_139072	NM_152915
RefSeq (protein)	NP_620711	NP_690879
Location (UCSC)	Chr 2: 229.36 – 229.71 Mb	Chr 1: 84.35 – 84.67 Mb
PubMed search
- Wikidata
View/Edit Human	View/Edit Mouse

Delta and Notch-like epidermal growth factor-related receptor is a protein that in humans is encoded by the DNER gene.
