= Matrilin-1 =

Protein found in humans

MATN1

Identifiers
- Aliases: MATN1, CMP, CRTM, matrilin 1, cartilage matrix protein, matrilin 1
- External IDs: OMIM: 115437; MGI: 106591; GeneCards: MATN1

Gene location (Human)
Chr.	Chromosome 1 (human)
Band	1p35.2	Start	30,711,277 bp
Band	1p35.2	End	30,723,585 bp

Gene location (Mouse)
Chr.	Chromosome 4 (mouse)
Band	4 D2.2|4 64.09 cM	Start	130,671,696 bp
Band	4 D2.2|4 64.09 cM	End	130,682,786 bp
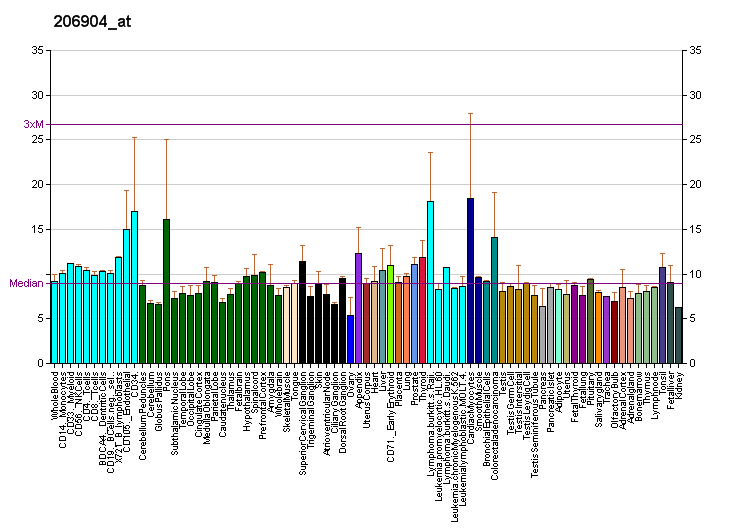

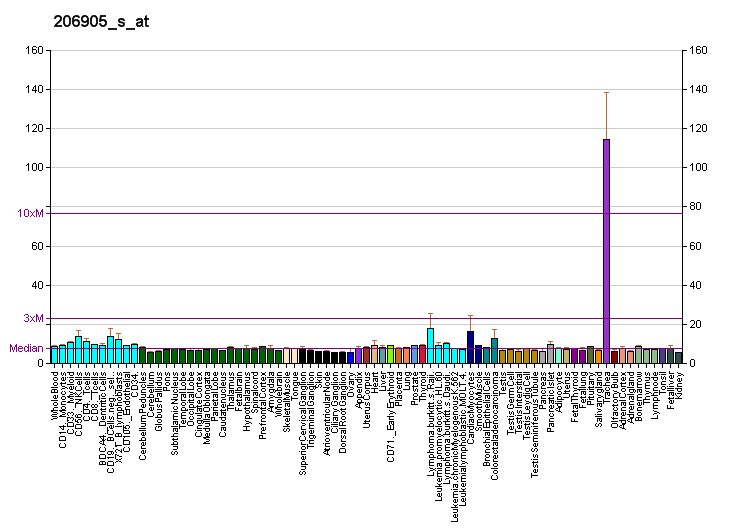
RNA expression pattern
Bgee	Human / Mouse (ortholog); Top expressed in: cartilage tissue; tibia; trachea; tendon of biceps brachii; testicle; internal globus pallidus; gonad; granulocyte; bone marrow; cervix / Top expressed in: occiput; occipital bone; splanchnocranium; toe; rib; thyroid cartilage; humerus; sphenoid bone; human fetus; ilium; More reference expression data
BioGPS	More reference expression data
Gene ontology
Molecular function	extracellular matrix structural constituent; protein binding; calcium ion binding
Cellular component	extracellular region; extracellular matrix; collagen-containing extracellular matrix; extracellular space
Biological process	extracellular matrix organization; chondrocyte differentiation; growth plate cartilage chondrocyte morphogenesis; regulation of bone mineralization; protein-containing complex assembly
Sources:Amigo / QuickGO
Orthologs
Databases	NCBI: entry; OMA: entry
Species	Human	Mouse
Entrez	4146	17180
Ensembl	ENSG00000162510	ENSMUSG00000040533
UniProt	P21941	P51942
RefSeq (mRNA)	NM_002379	NM_010769
RefSeq (protein)	NP_002370	NP_034899
Location (UCSC)	Chr 1: 30.71 – 30.72 Mb	Chr 4: 130.67 – 130.68 Mb
PubMed search
- Wikidata
View/Edit Human	View/Edit Mouse

Matrilin 1, cartilage matrix protein, also known as MATN1, is a matrilin protein which in humans is encoded by the MATN1 gene.

== Function ==
This gene encodes a member of von Willebrand factor A domain containing protein family. This family of proteins are thought to be involved in the formation of filamentous networks in the extracellular matrices of various tissues. Mutations of this gene have been associated with variety of inherited chondrodysplasias. Three microsatellite polymorphisms in the gene, respectively consisting of 103 bp, 101 bp and 99 bp, have been linked to idiopathic scoliosis.
