= MEGF6 =

Protein-coding gene in humans

Identifiers
- Aliases: MEGF6, EGFL3, multiple EGF like domains 6
- External IDs: OMIM: 604266; MGI: 1919351; GeneCards: MEGF6

Gene location (Human)
Chr.	Chromosome 1 (human)
Band	1p36.32	Start	3,487,951 bp
Band	1p36.32	End	3,611,508 bp

Gene location (Mouse)
Chr.	Chromosome 4 (mouse)
Band	4|4 E2	Start	154,255,187 bp
Band	4|4 E2	End	154,360,170 bp
RNA expression pattern
Bgee	Human / Mouse (ortholog); Top expressed in: right coronary artery; Descending thoracic aorta; ascending aorta; left coronary artery; skin of abdomen; left uterine tube; skin of leg; popliteal artery; tibial arteries; vagina / Top expressed in: molar; otic vesicle; lip; calvaria; internal carotid artery; efferent ductule; external carotid artery; squamous epithelium; esophagus; mesothelium; More reference expression data
BioGPS	n/a
Gene ontology
Molecular function	protein binding; calcium ion binding
Cellular component	extracellular region; cellular component
Biological process	biological process
Sources:Amigo / QuickGO
Orthologs
Databases	NCBI: entry; OMA: entry
Species	Human	Mouse
Entrez	1953	230971
Ensembl	ENSG00000162591	ENSMUSG00000057751
UniProt	O75095	Q80V70
RefSeq (mRNA)	NM_001409	NM_001162977; NM_172273
RefSeq (protein)	NP_001400	n/a
Location (UCSC)	Chr 1: 3.49 – 3.61 Mb	Chr 4: 154.26 – 154.36 Mb
PubMed search
- Wikidata
View/Edit Human	View/Edit Mouse

Multiple EGF like domains 6 is a protein that in humans is encoded by the MEGF6 gene.
