= NAGPA =

Protein-coding gene in the species Homo sapiens

Identifiers
- Aliases: NAGPA, Nagpa, AI596180, UCE, APAA, N-acetylglucosamine-1-phosphodiester alpha-N-acetylglucosaminidase
- External IDs: OMIM: 607985; MGI: 1351598; GeneCards: NAGPA
Enzyme activity
EC #	BRENDA	ExPASy	KEGG	MetaCyc
3.1.4.45	↗	↗	↗	↗

Gene location (Human)
Chr.	Chromosome 16 (human)
Band	16p13.3	Start	5,024,844 bp
Band	16p13.3	End	5,034,141 bp

Gene location (Mouse)
Chr.	Chromosome 16 (mouse)
Band	16|16 A1	Start	5,013,153 bp
Band	16|16 A1	End	5,021,876 bp
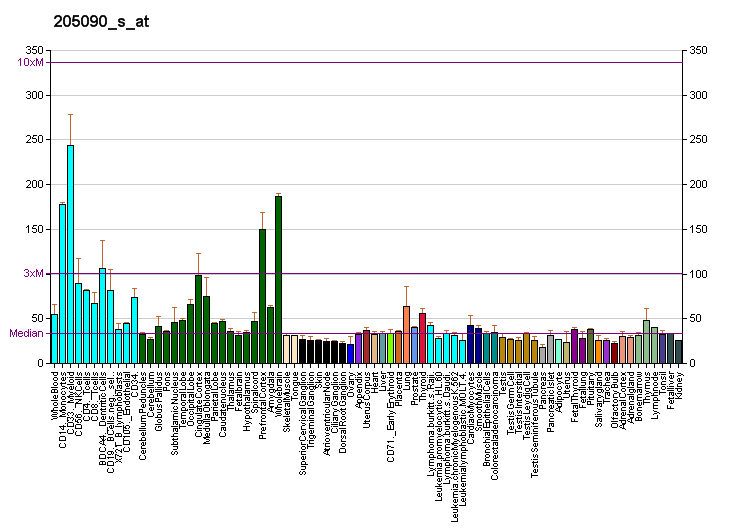
RNA expression pattern
Bgee	Human / Mouse (ortholog); Top expressed in: middle temporal gyrus; Brodmann area 10; right frontal lobe; oocyte; primary visual cortex; Brodmann area 9; secondary oocyte; Brodmann area 23; granulocyte; monocyte / Top expressed in: interventricular septum; yolk sac; right kidney; genital tubercle; submandibular gland; granulocyte; lip; esophagus; morula; embryo; More reference expression data
BioGPS	More reference expression data
Gene ontology
Molecular function	N-acetylglucosamine-1-phosphodiester alpha-N-acetylglucosaminidase activity; hydrolase activity; protein binding
Cellular component	integral component of membrane; Golgi cisterna membrane; Golgi apparatus; membrane; integral component of plasma membrane
Biological process	protein glycosylation; protein targeting to lysosome; lysosome organization; secretion of lysosomal enzymes; carbohydrate metabolic process
Sources:Amigo / QuickGO
Orthologs
Databases	NCBI: entry; OMA: entry
Species	Human	Mouse
Entrez	51172	27426
Ensembl	ENSG00000103174	ENSMUSG00000023143
UniProt	Q9UK23	Q8BJ48
RefSeq (mRNA)	NM_016256	NM_013796
RefSeq (protein)	NP_057340	NP_038824
Location (UCSC)	Chr 16: 5.02 – 5.03 Mb	Chr 16: 5.01 – 5.02 Mb
PubMed search
- Wikidata
View/Edit Human	View/Edit Mouse

N-acetylglucosamine-1-phosphodiester alpha-N-acetylglucosaminidase is an enzyme that in humans is encoded by the NAGPA gene.

Hydrolases are transported to lysosomes after binding to mannose 6-phosphate receptors in the trans-Golgi network. This gene encodes the enzyme that catalyzes the second step in the formation of the mannose 6-phosphate recognition marker on lysosomal hydrolases. Commonly known as 'uncovering enzyme' or UCE, this enzyme removes N-acetyl-D-glucosamine (GlcNAc) residues from GlcNAc-alpha-P-mannose moieties and thereby produces the recognition marker. This reaction most likely occurs in the trans-Golgi network. This enzyme functions as a homotetramer of two disulfide-linked homodimers. In addition to having an N-terminal signal peptide, the protein's C-terminus contains multiple signals for trafficking it between lysosomes, the plasma membrane, and trans-Golgi network.

To date, the only disorder in humans associated with this gene is Persistent Neurodevelopmental Stuttering (PNdS).
