= LTBP3 =

Protein-coding gene in the species Homo sapiens

Identifiers
- Aliases: LTBP3, LTBP-3, LTBP2, STHAG6, pp6425, DASS, latent transforming growth factor beta binding protein 3, GPHYSD3
- External IDs: OMIM: 602090; MGI: 1101355; HomoloGene: 7405; GeneCards: LTBP3; OMA:LTBP3 - orthologs

Gene location (Human)
| Chr. | Chromosome 11 (human) |
| Band | 11q13.1 | Start | 65,538,559 bp |
| Band | 11q13.1 | End | 65,558,930 bp |

Gene location (Mouse)
| Chr. | Chromosome 19 (mouse) |
| Band | 19 A|19 4.34 cM | Start | 5,790,932 bp |
| Band | 19 A|19 4.34 cM | End | 5,808,560 bp |
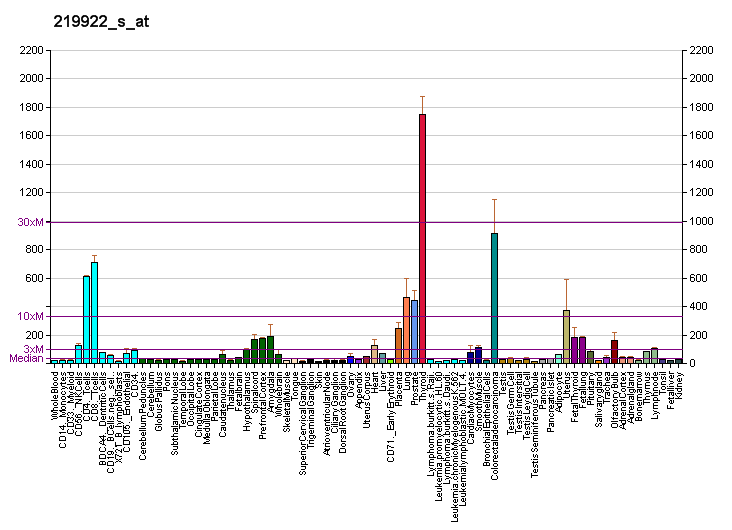
RNA expression pattern
| Bgee | Human / Mouse (ortholog); Top expressed in: Descending thoracic aorta; ascending aorta; right ovary; right coronary artery; left ovary; gastric mucosa; right uterine tube; body of uterus; stromal cell of endometrium; canal of the cervix / Top expressed in: ciliary body; ascending aorta; semi-lunar valve; external carotid artery; iris; aortic valve; vestibular membrane of cochlear duct; retinal pigment epithelium; tunica media of zone of aorta; internal carotid artery; More reference expression data |
| BioGPS | More reference expression data |
Gene ontology
| Molecular function | calcium ion binding; transforming growth factor beta binding; growth factor binding |
| Cellular component | extracellular matrix; extracellular exosome; extracellular region; collagen-containing extracellular matrix |
| Biological process | transforming growth factor beta activation; positive regulation of mesenchymal stem cell proliferation; positive regulation of mesenchymal stem cell differentiation |
Sources:Amigo / QuickGO
Orthologs
| Species | Human | Mouse |
| Entrez | 4054 | 16998 |
| Ensembl | ENSG00000168056 | ENSMUSG00000024940 |
| UniProt | Q9NS15 | Q61810 |
| RefSeq (mRNA) | NM_001130144; NM_001164266; NM_021070 | NM_008520 |
| RefSeq (protein) | NP_001123616; NP_001157738; NP_066548 | NP_032546 |
| Location (UCSC) | Chr 11: 65.54 – 65.56 Mb | Chr 19: 5.79 – 5.81 Mb |
| PubMed search |
- Wikidata
| View/Edit Human | View/Edit Mouse |

Latent-transforming growth factor beta-binding protein 3 is a protein that in humans is encoded by the LTBP3 gene.
