= LTBP2 =

Protein-coding gene in the species Homo sapiens

Identifiers
- Aliases: LTBP2, C14orf141, GLC3D, LTBP3, MSPKA, MSTP031, WMS3, latent transforming growth factor beta binding protein 2
- External IDs: OMIM: 602091; MGI: 99502; HomoloGene: 369; GeneCards: LTBP2; OMA:LTBP2 - orthologs

Gene location (Human)
| Chr. | Chromosome 14 (human) |
| Band | 14q24.3 | Start | 74,498,183 bp |
| Band | 14q24.3 | End | 74,612,378 bp |

Gene location (Mouse)
| Chr. | Chromosome 12 (mouse) |
| Band | 12|12 D1 | Start | 84,829,986 bp |
| Band | 12|12 D1 | End | 84,923,306 bp |
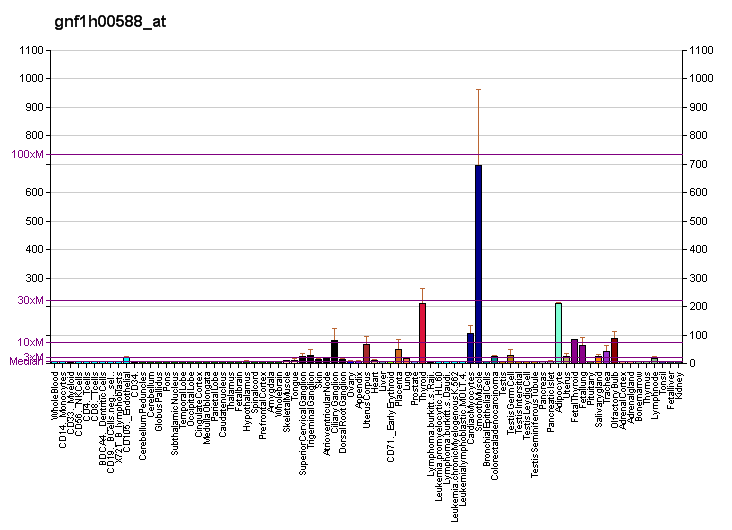

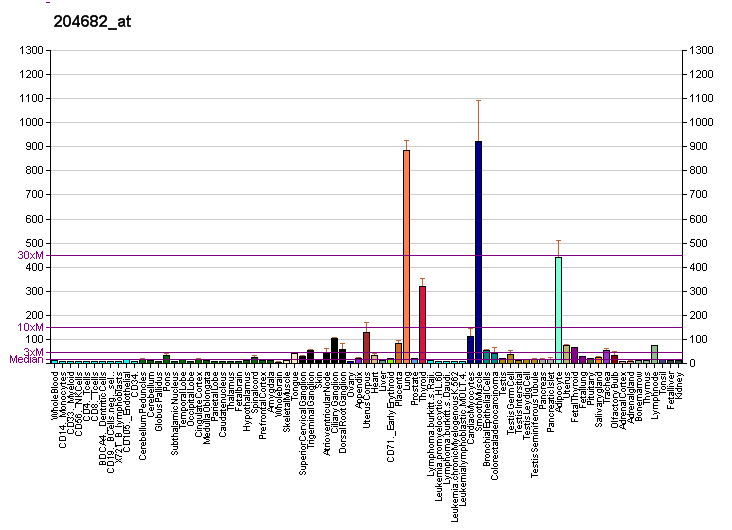
RNA expression pattern
| Bgee | Human / Mouse (ortholog); Top expressed in: Descending thoracic aorta; ascending aorta; stromal cell of endometrium; right coronary artery; tendon of biceps brachii; saphenous vein; pericardium; left coronary artery; popliteal artery; tibial arteries / Top expressed in: aortic valve; ascending aorta; rib; stroma of bone marrow; vestibular membrane of cochlear duct; external carotid artery; left lung lobe; brown adipose tissue; ciliary body; calvaria; More reference expression data |
| BioGPS | More reference expression data |
Gene ontology
| Molecular function | calcium ion binding; heparin binding; protein binding; growth factor binding; extracellular matrix structural constituent; microfibril binding |
| Cellular component | extracellular matrix; extracellular exosome; intracellular anatomical structure; extracellular space; extracellular region; collagen-containing extracellular matrix |
| Biological process | protein targeting; transforming growth factor beta receptor signaling pathway; protein secretion; supramolecular fiber organization |
Sources:Amigo / QuickGO
Orthologs
| Species | Human | Mouse |
| Entrez | 4053 | 16997 |
| Ensembl | ENSG00000119681 | ENSMUSG00000002020 |
| UniProt | Q14767 | O08999 |
| RefSeq (mRNA) | NM_000428 | NM_013589; NM_001370743 |
| RefSeq (protein) | NP_000419 | NP_038617; NP_001357672 |
| Location (UCSC) | Chr 14: 74.5 – 74.61 Mb | Chr 12: 84.83 – 84.92 Mb |
| PubMed search |
- Wikidata
| View/Edit Human | View/Edit Mouse |

Latent-transforming growth factor beta-binding protein 2 is a protein that in humans is encoded by the LTBP2 gene.

The protein encoded by this gene belongs to the family of latent transforming growth factor (TGF)-beta binding proteins (LTBP), which are extracellular matrix proteins with multi-domain structure. This protein is the largest member of the LTBP family possessing unique regions and with most similarity to the fibrillins.

It has thus been suggested that it may have multiple functions: as a member of the TGF-beta latent complex, as a structural component of microfibrils, and a role in cell adhesion.
