= Flamingo (protein) =

Protein

cadherin, EGF LAG seven-pass G-type receptor 1 (flamingo homolog, Drosophila)

Identifiers
- Symbol: CELSR1
- NCBI gene: 9620
- OMIM: 604523

cadherin, EGF LAG seven-pass G-type receptor 2 (flamingo homolog, Drosophila)

Identifiers
- Symbol: CELSR2
- Alt. symbols: EGFL2
- NCBI gene: 1952
- OMIM: 604265

cadherin, EGF LAG seven-pass G-type receptor 3 (flamingo homolog, Drosophila)

Identifiers
- Symbol: CELSR3
- Alt. symbols: EGFL1
- NCBI gene: 1951
- OMIM: 604264

Flamingo is a member of the adhesion-GPCR family of proteins. Flamingo has sequence homology to cadherins and G protein-coupled receptors (GPCR). Flamingo was originally identified as a Drosophila protein involved in planar cell polarity. Mammals have three flamingo homologs, CELSR1, CELSR2, CELSR3. In mice, all three have distinct expression patterns in organs such as the kidney, skin, and lungs, as well as the brain.

== Protein structure ==
Flamingo is an atypical cadherin, with a cadherin-like extracellular domain, composed of cadherin and EGF adhesive repeats, that can bind to other Flamingo proteins expressed on neighboring cells. The transmembrane domain, however, is a 7-pass membrane domain most structurally similar to that of a G protein-coupled receptor, though it is not known to interact with G protein.

== Planar cell polarity ==
Flamingo is one of the core proteins in the planar cell polarity (PCP) pathway, which is required for successful body elongation during gastrulation in early development, as well as the formation of developing organs such as the brain, inner ear, and kidney. It has been extensively studied for its role in patterning developmental tissues in a wide range of species. CELSR1 is the primary flamingo homolog involved in PCP in vertebrates. In humans, CELSR1 mutations are correlated with severe birth defects, including brain, hearing, and kidney defects, due to incorrect establishment of planar polarity in those organs.

== Function in neurons ==
In Drosophila, flamingo mutants were found to have abnormal dendrite branching, outgrowth and routing. Kimura et al. proposed that flamingo regulates dendrite branch elongation and prevents the dendritic trees of adjacent Drosophila sensory neurons from having overlap of dendritic arbors.

A study of mammalian flamingo homolog CELSR2 found that it is involved in the regulation of dendrite growth. RNAi was used to alter CELSR2 expression in cortical and cerebral brain slice cultures. The dendrites of pyramidal neurons in cortical cultures and Purkinje neurons in cerebellar cultures were simplified when CELSR2 expression was reduced. Mice that lack CELSR3 have altered bundling of axons to form fascicles.
