= Muscular dystrophy =

Diseases in which skeletal and visceral muscles break down over time

- Other names: Muscle dysfunction
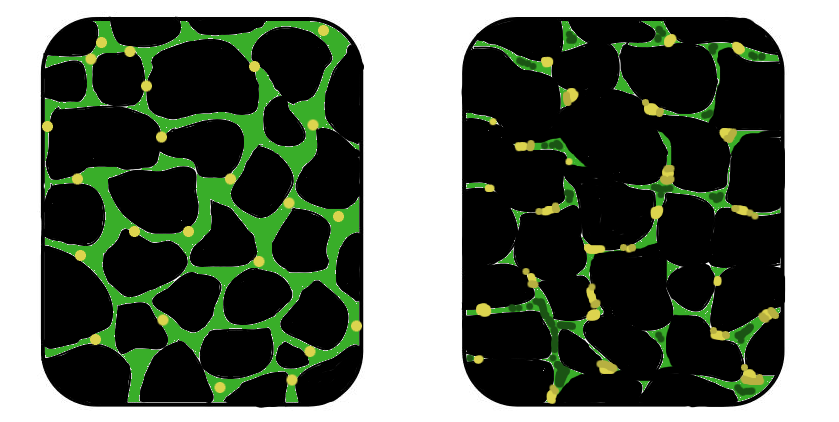
- In affected muscle (right), the tissue has become disorganized and the concentration of dystrophin (green) is greatly reduced, compared to normal muscle (left).
- Specialty: Neuromuscular medicine
- Symptoms: Increasing weakening, breakdown of skeletal muscles, trouble walking
- Duration: Chronic
- Types: > 30, including Duchenne muscular dystrophy, Becker muscular dystrophy, facioscapulohumeral muscular dystrophy, limb–girdle muscular dystrophy, myotonic dystrophy
- Causes: Genetic (X-linked recessive, autosomal recessive, or autosomal dominant)
- Diagnostic method: Genetic testing
- Treatment: Pharmacotherapy, physical therapy, braces, corrective surgery, assisted ventilation
- Prognosis: Depends on the particular disorder

Muscular dystrophy (MD) is a genetically and clinically heterogeneous group of rare neuromuscular diseases that cause progressive weakness and breakdown of skeletal muscles over time. The disorders differ as to which muscles are primarily affected, the degree of weakness, how fast they worsen, and when symptoms begin. Some types are also associated with problems in other organs.

Over 30 different disorders are classified as muscular dystrophies. Of those, Duchenne muscular dystrophy (DMD) accounts for approximately 50% of cases and affects males beginning around the age of four. Other relatively common muscular dystrophies include Becker muscular dystrophy, facioscapulohumeral muscular dystrophy, and myotonic dystrophy, whereas limb–girdle muscular dystrophy and congenital muscular dystrophy are themselves groups of several – usually extremely rare – genetic disorders.

Muscular dystrophies are caused by mutations in genes, usually those involved in making muscle proteins. The muscle protein dystrophin is in most muscle cells and works to strengthen the muscle fibers and protect them from injury as muscles contract and relax. It links the muscle membrane to the thin muscular filaments within the cell. Dystrophin is an integral part of the muscular structure. An absence of dystrophin can cause impairments: healthy muscle tissue can be replaced by fibrous tissue and fat, causing an inability to generate force. Respiratory and cardiac complications can occur as well. These mutations are either inherited from parents or may occur spontaneously during early development. Muscular dystrophies may be X-linked recessive, autosomal recessive, or autosomal dominant. Diagnosis often involves blood tests and genetic testing.

There is no cure for any disorder from the muscular dystrophy group. Several drugs designed to address the root cause are currently available including gene therapy (Elevidys), and antisense drugs (Ataluren, Eteplirsen etc.). Other medications used include glucocorticoids (Deflazacort, Vamorolone); calcium channel blockers (Diltiazem); to slow skeletal and cardiac muscle degeneration, anticonvulsants to control seizures and some muscle activity, and Histone deacetylase inhibitors (Givinostat) to delay damage to dying muscle cells. Physical therapy, braces, and corrective surgery may help with some symptoms while assisted ventilation may be required in those with weakness of breathing muscles.

Outcomes depend on the specific type of disorder. Many affected people will eventually become unable to walk and Duchenne muscular dystrophy in particular is associated with shortened life expectancy.

Muscular dystrophy was first described in the 1830s by Charles Bell. The word "dystrophy" comes from the Greek dys, meaning "no, un-" and troph- meaning "nourish".

== Signs and symptoms ==
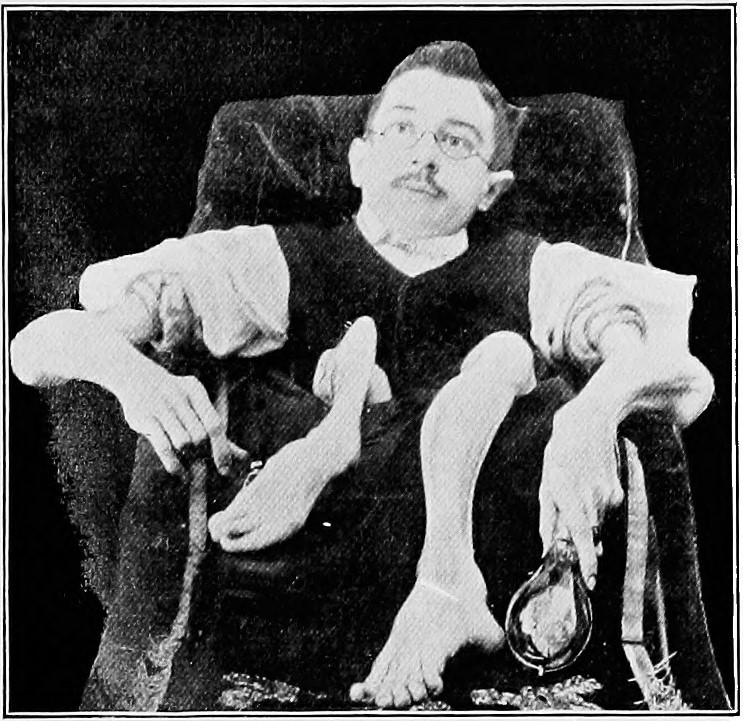
Severe limb deformities and contractures indicative of muscular dystrophy

The signs and symptoms consistent with muscular dystrophy are:

- Progressive muscular wasting
- Poor balance
- Scoliosis (abnormal curvature of the spine or the back)
- Muscle contracture leads to limited range of movement of joints.
- Muscle spasms
- Progressive inability to walk
- Waddling gait
- Gowers' sign as in Duchenne muscular dystrophy.
- Calf deformation as in Duchenne muscular dystrophy.
- Respiratory difficulty
- Cardiomyopathy

== Causes ==
The majority of muscular dystrophies are inherited; the different muscular dystrophies follow various inheritance patterns (X-linked, autosomal recessive or autosomal dominant). In a small percentage of patients, the disorder may have been caused by a de novo (spontaneous) mutation.

== Diagnosis ==
The diagnosis of muscular dystrophy is based on the results of muscle biopsy, increased creatine phosphokinase (CpK3), electromyography, and genetic testing. A physical examination and the patient's medical history will help the doctor determine the type of muscular dystrophy. Specific muscle groups are affected by different types of muscular dystrophy.

An MRI can be used to assess the white matter of the nervous system and measure the merosin levels in young boys. An absence of merosin in young boys will result with neurological deficits and changes in the white matter.

=== Classification ===
Disorder name	OMIM	Gene	Inheritance pattern	Age of onset	Muscles affected	Description
Becker muscular dystrophy	300376	DMD	XR	Childhood	Distal limbs progressing to generalised weakness	A less severe variant of Duchenne muscular dystrophy, affects predominantly boys.
Collagen VI-related dystrophies, including Bethlem muscular dystrophy, intermediate collagen VI-related dystrophy and Ullrich congenital muscular dystrophy	158810 254090	COL6A1, COL6A2, COL6A3	AD, AR	Congenital to adult	Proximal, axial and respiratory muscles; joint contractures and distal joint laxity may occur	A spectrum of collagen VI-related muscle disorders ranging from the milder Bethlem phenotype through intermediate forms to the more severe Ullrich congenital muscular dystrophy phenotype.
Congenital muscular dystrophy	Multiple	Multiple	AD, AR	At birth	Generalised weakness	Symptoms include general muscle weakness and possible joint deformities. Disease progresses slowly, and lifespan is shortened. Congenital muscular dystrophy includes several disorders with a range of symptoms. Muscle degeneration may be mild or severe. Problems may be restricted to skeletal muscle, or muscle degeneration may be paired with effects on the brain and other organ systems. Several forms of the congenital muscular dystrophies are caused by defects in proteins thought to have some relationship to the dystrophin-glycoprotein complex and to the connections between muscle cells and their surrounding cellular structure. Some forms of congenital muscular dystrophy show severe brain malformations, such as lissencephaly and hydrocephalus.
Duchenne muscular dystrophy	310200	DMD	XR	Childhood	Distal limbs progressing to generalised weakness, involving respiratory muscles	The most common childhood form of muscular dystrophy, affects predominantly boys (mild symptoms may occur in female carriers). Characterised by progressive muscle wasting. Clinical symptoms become evident when the child begins walking. By age 10, the child may need braces and by age 12, most patients are unable to walk. Typical lifespans range from 15 to 45. Sporadic mutations in this gene occur frequently.
Distal muscular dystrophy	254130	DYSF	AD, AR	20–60 years	Distal muscles in hands, forearms and lower legs	Progress is slow and not life-threatening. Miyoshi myopathy, one of the distal muscular dystrophies, causes initial weakness in the calf muscles, and is caused by defects in the same gene responsible for one form of limb–girdle muscular dystrophy.
Emery–Dreifuss muscular dystrophy	Multiple	Multiple	XR, AD, AR	Childhood, early teenage years	Distal limb muscles, limb-girdle, heart	Symptoms include muscle weakness and wasting, starting in the distal limb muscles and progressing to involve the limb–girdle muscles. Most patients also have cardiac conduction defects and arrhythmias.
Facioscapulohumeral muscular dystrophy	158900	DUX4	AD	Adolescence	Face, shoulders, upper arms, progressing to other muscles	Causes progressive weakness, initially in the muscles of the face, shoulders, and upper arms. Additional muscles are often affected. Affected individuals can become severely disabled, with 20% requiring a wheelchair by age 50. 30% of cases involve spontaneous mutations. Penetrance and severity seem to be lower in females compared to males.
Limb–girdle muscular dystrophy	Multiple	Multiple	AD, AR	Any	Upper arms and legs	The person normally leads a normal life with some assistance. Rare cardiopulmonary complications can be life-threatening.
Myotonic muscular dystrophy	160900; 602668	DMPK; CNBP	AD	Adulthood	Skeletal muscles, heart, other muscle groups	Presents with myotonia (delayed relaxation of muscles), as well as muscle wasting and weakness. Varies in severity and manifestations and affects many body systems in addition to skeletal muscles, including the heart, endocrine organs, and eyes.
Oculopharyngeal muscular dystrophy	164300	PABPN1	AD, rarely AR	40–50 years	Eye muscles, face, throat, pelvis, shoulders	

== Management ==
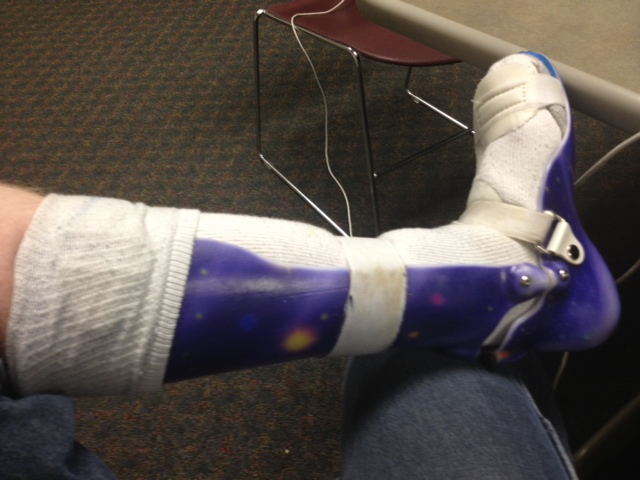
Ankle foot orthosis

There is no cure for muscular dystrophy. In terms of management, physical therapy, occupational therapy, orthotic intervention (e.g., ankle-foot orthosis), speech therapy, and respiratory therapy may be helpful. Low-intensity corticosteroids such as prednisone, and deflazacort may help to maintain muscle tone. Orthoses (orthopedic appliances used for support) and corrective orthopedic surgery may be needed to improve the quality of life in some cases. The cardiac problems that occur with Emery–Dreifuss muscular dystrophy (EDMD) and myotonic muscular dystrophy may require a pacemaker. The myotonia (delayed relaxation of a muscle after a strong contraction) occurring in myotonic muscular dystrophy may be treated with medications such as quinine.

Low-intensity assisted exercises, dynamic exercise training, or assisted bicycle training of the arms and legs during a 24-week trial were shown to significantly delay the functional loss of muscular dystrophy. These therapies may be performed in a safe and feasible manner, even for children in their ambulation stages. However, eccentric or intense exercises causing soreness should not be used, as they can cause further damage.

Occupational therapy assists the patient to engage in activities of daily living (such as self-feeding and self-care activities) and leisure activities at the most independent level possible. This may be achieved with use of adaptive equipment or the use of energy-conservation techniques. Occupational therapy may implement changes to a person's environment, both at home or work, to increase the individual's function and accessibility. Furthermore, it addresses psychosocial changes and cognitive decline that may accompany MD, and provides support and education about the disease to the family and patient.

== Prognosis ==
Prognosis depends on the individual form of muscular dystrophy. Some dystrophies cause progressive weakness and loss of muscle function, which may result in severe physical disability and a life-threatening deterioration of respiratory muscles or heart. Other dystrophies do not affect life expectancy and only cause relatively mild impairment.

== History ==
In the 1860s, descriptions of boys who grew progressively weaker, lost the ability to walk, and died at an early age became more prominent in medical journals. In the following decade, French neurologist Guillaume Duchenne published a comprehensive account of the most common and severe form of the disease, which now carries his name.

== Society and culture ==
In 1966 in the U.S. and Canada, Jerry Lewis and the Muscular Dystrophy Association (MDA) began the annual Labor Day telecast The Jerry Lewis Telethon, significant in raising awareness of muscular dystrophy in North America. Some disability-rights advocates have criticized the telethon for portraying victims of the disease as deserving pity rather than respect.

On December 18, 2001, the MD CARE Act was signed into law in the United States. The law amends the Public Health Service Act to provide research for the various muscular dystrophies and established the Muscular Dystrophy Coordinating Committee to help focus research efforts through a coherent research strategy.

== Research and advocacy ==
The Muscular Dystrophy Association (MDA) is involved in research, advocacy, and services for individuals affected by muscular dystrophy. The organization provides resources that contribute to understanding and addressing this condition.

== See also ==
- Fukuyama congenital muscular dystrophy
- Muscle hypertrophy
- Muscular Dystrophy UK
- Muscular Dystrophy Association (United States)
- Muscular Dystrophy Canada
- Spinal muscular atrophies
