= SUN domain =

Sad1_UNC

Identifiers
- Symbol: Sad1_UNC
- Pfam: PF07738
- Pfam clan: CL0202
- InterPro: IPR012919
Available protein structures:
- PDB: IPR012919 PF07738 (ECOD; PDBsum)
- AlphaFold: IPR012919; PF07738

SUN (Sad1p, UNC-84) domains are conserved C-terminal protein regions a few hundred amino acids long. SUN domains are usually found following a transmembrane domain and a less conserved region of amino acids. Most proteins containing SUN domains are thought to be involved in the positioning of the nucleus in the cell. It is thought that SUN domains interact directly with KASH domains in the space between the outer and inner nuclear membranes to bridge the nuclear envelope and transfer force from the nucleoskeleton to the cytoplasmic cytoskeleton which enables mechanosensory roles in cells. SUN proteins are thought to localize to the inner nuclear membrane. The S. pombe Sad1 protein localises at the spindle pole body. In mammals, the SUN domain is present in two proteins, Sun1 and Sun2. The SUN domain of Sun2 has been demonstrated to be in the periplasm.

== Examples of SUN proteins ==
Caenorhabditis elegans

- SUN-1/matefin
- UNC-84

Drosophila melanogaster

- Klaroid
- Spag4

Mammals

- SUN1, SUN2, SUN3, SUN4, SUN5

Schizosaccharomyces pombe

- Sad1p

Saccharomyces cerevisiae

- Mps3p

Maize

- SUN1, SUN2, SUN3, SUN4, SUN5

Arabidopsis

- SUN1, SUN2
