= Emery–Dreifuss muscular dystrophy =

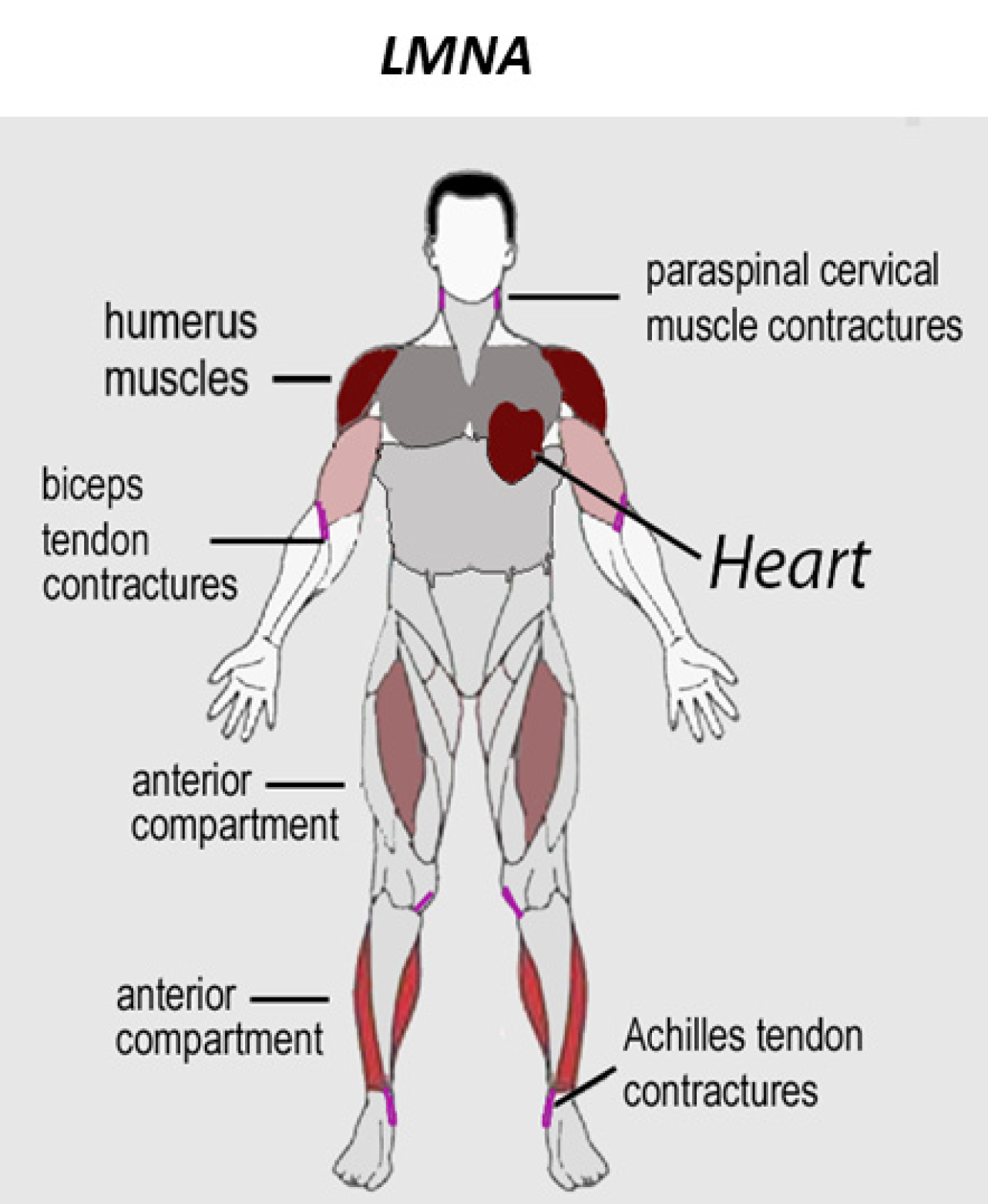
- Diagram of the muscles preferentially weakened and the locations of contraction development in EDMD2, due to LMNA mutation.
- Specialty: Neurology, neuromuscular medicine
- Symptoms: Joint contractures, muscle weakness, heart issues
- Complications: Heart failure
- Usual onset: First or second decade
- Duration: Lifelong
- Causes: Mutation in one of several gene, including EMD LMNA genes
- Diagnostic method: Genetic testing. Adjunctive: creatine kinase, EMG, and muscle MRI
- Treatment: Physical therapy, orthopedic surgery, pacemaker
- Frequency: 0.39 per 100,000

Emery–Dreifuss muscular dystrophy (EDMD) is a type of muscular dystrophy, a group of heritable diseases that cause progressive impairment of muscles. EDMD affects muscles used for movement (skeletal muscles), causing atrophy, weakness, and contractures. It almost always affects the heart, causing abnormal rhythms, heart failure, or sudden cardiac death. It is rare, affecting 0.39 per 100,000 (1 per 250,000) people. It is named after Alan Eglin H. Emery and Fritz E. Dreifuss.

== Classification ==
Emery–Dreifuss muscular dystrophy can be sub-classified by pattern of inheritance: X-linked, autosomal dominant, and autosomal recessive.

- Autosomal dominant: heart problems with weakness (and wasting) of skeletal muscles and Achilles tendon contractures.
- X-linked: result of the EMD gene mutation, characterized by cardiac involvement.
- Autosomal recessive: characterized by cardiac issues, such as arrhythmia.

== Signs and symptoms ==
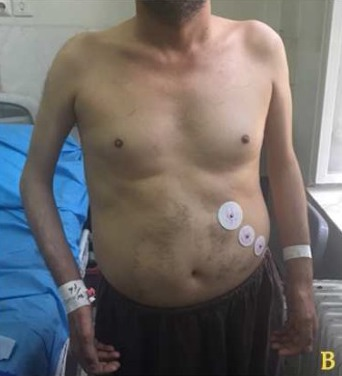
Humeral muscle atrophy and elbow contracture in person with EDMD

The classic triad of EDMD consists of early contractures, muscle weakness, and heart involvement, typically manifesting in adolescence.

Contractures often manifest before weakness, and they can be more disabling. They tend to fix the elbow into flexion and ankle into plantarflexion via Achilles tendon shortening. The spine is also affected, with limited neck flexion initially, and eventually the entire spine can become fixed into extension, referred to as a rigid spine. Elbow and neck contractures seldom occur in other diseases. Eventually, orthopedics (walker, cane) may be needed.

The weakness is slowly progressive and preferentially involves the muscles that overlie the humerus bone (biceps and triceps muscles) and those situated on the outside of the lower leg (peroneal). Later, the muscles that position the scapula can be weakened, completing a pattern that is termed 'scapulohumeroperoneal'. Weakness of the scapular fixators can cause a winged scapula, which can impair the ability to lift the arms over the head and can be painful. Weakness of the peroneal muscles can result in toe walking, which can present in the first decade of life. Facial, hand, and thigh muscles can be affected, although less often. Calf hypertrophy can occur.

Involvement of the heart occurs in almost all cases, presenting as syncope in the second or third decades, or as sudden cardiac death. A multitude of cardiac arrhythmias can result, requiring a pacemaker often by age 30 years. Reported arrhythmias include bradycardia, atrial fibrillation/flutter, atrioventricular conduction defect, and atrial paralysis. Later in the disease, cardiomyopathy can occur. Sometimes, cardiac involvement is the predominant manifestation of EDMD, with minimal involvement of the skeletal muscles.

=== EDMD1 ===
Skeletal muscle involvement usually occurs before cardiac involvement. Of female carriers, 10-20% have abnormal heart rhythm or conduction, with increased risk of sudden cardiac death.

=== EDMD2 ===
The disease course of EDMD 2 is more severe than EDMD1. Compared to EDMD1, cardiac symptoms are more likely to be the initial manifestation. EDMD2 can result in a much broader spectrum of disease, and the severity of muscle weakness is less predictable. However, muscle weakness typically is slowly progressive in first three decades, with an increased rate of progression thereafter.

== Genetics ==
Mutations in one of several genes cause the various types of Emery–Dreifuss muscular dystrophy. Mutation of the EMD or LMNA gene is the cause in 40% of cases. Each gene implicated in EDMD provides instructions for making a protein that is associated with the nuclear envelope, which surrounds the nucleus of a cell. The nuclear envelope regulates the movement of molecules into and out of the nucleus, and researchers believe it may play a role in regulating the activity of certain genes.

Type	OMIM	Gene	Protein	Inheritance	Description
EDMD1	310300	EMD	emerin	XLR	Emerin is a transmembrane protein of the inner nuclear membrane which appears to be essential for the normal function of skeletal and cardiac muscle. Most EMD mutations prevent the production of any functional emerin.
EDMD2	181350	LMNA	lamin A and lamin C	AD	EDMD-causing mutations of LMNA result in the production of an altered version of their encoded proteins.
EDMD3	616516	LMNA	lamin A and lamin C	AR	EDMD-causing mutations of LMNA result in the production of an altered version of their encoded proteins.
EDMD4	612998	SYNE1	nesprin-1	AD	Muscle cells indicate loss of nuclear envelope consistency. Cerebellar ataxia occurs at approximately 30 years of age.
EDMD5	612999	SYNE2	nesprin-2	AD	In SYNE2 we see a transition in the said gene, that results in T89M as a result of a substitution. Via fluorescent in-situ hybridization the gene is located at chromosome 14q23
EDMD6	300696	FHL1	four and a half LIM domains 1 (FHL1)	XLR	FHL1 is located at the sarcomere and sarcolemma, unlike the rest of the proteins implicated in EDMD. It is involved in sarcomere assembly.
EDMD7	614302	TMEM43	transmembrane protein 43 (LUMA)	AD	LUMA binds to emerin and LMNA, and interacts with SUN2. It is involved with nuclear membrane structural organization and maintenance of shape, and deficiency of it causes abnormally shaped nuclei.
XLR = X-linked recessive; AD = autosomal dominant; AR = autosomal recessive

Mutations of the genes SUN1 and SUN2 have each been shown to cause EDMD in single cases. TTN has also been associated with EDMD phenotype.

Protein structures

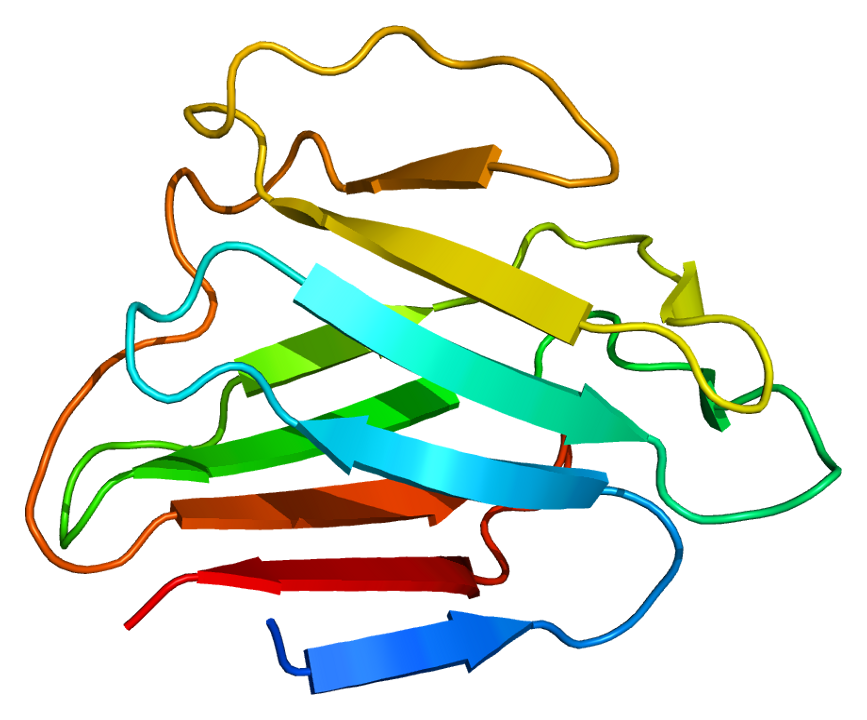
Protein LMNA

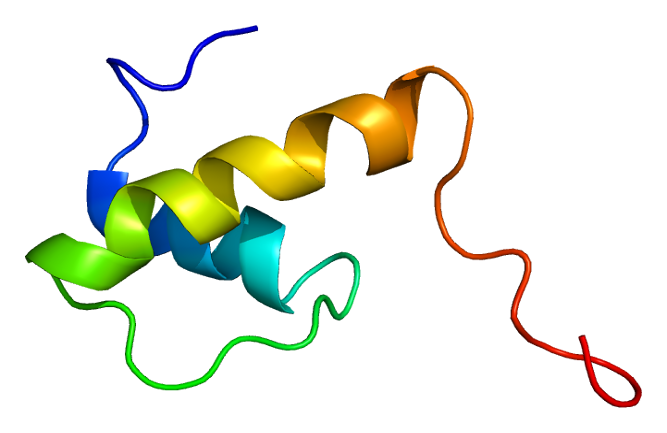
Protein EMD

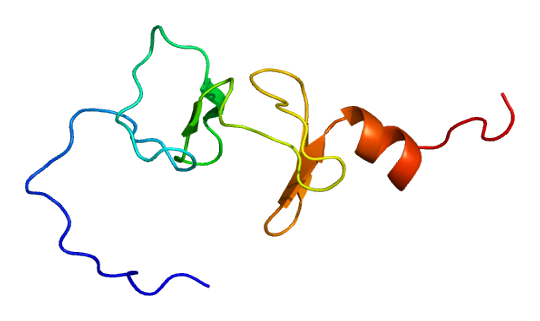
Protein FHL1

== Pathophysiology ==
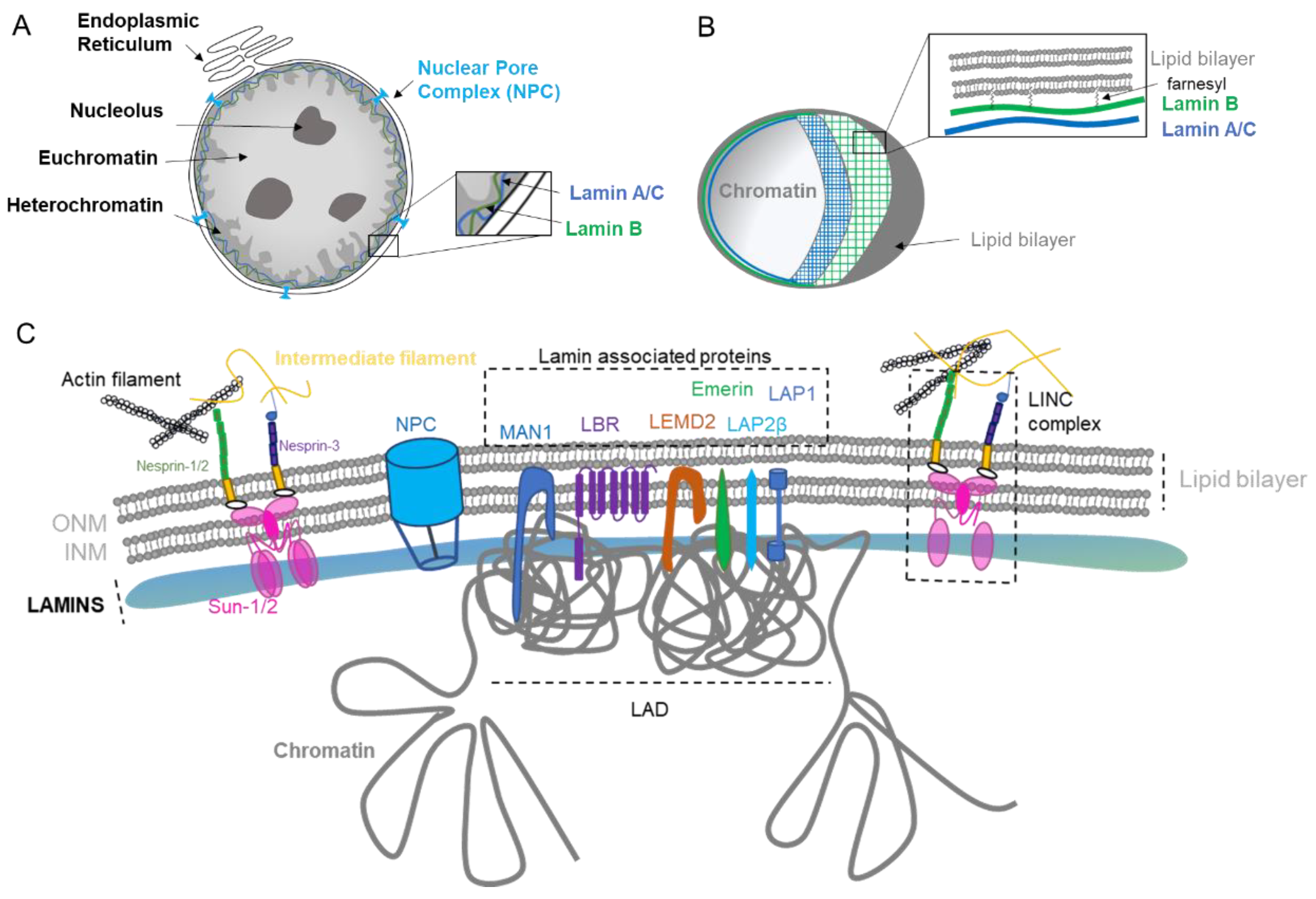
Depiction of nuclear envelope and its proteins, many of which are implicated in EDMD

Genetic mutations causing EDMD affect proteins comprising the nuclear membrane.Possibly, in all EDMD subtypes, there is impaired protein importation into the nucleus.

Another possibility is that in all subtypes, there is a loss of nuclear structural integrity.

== Diagnosis ==
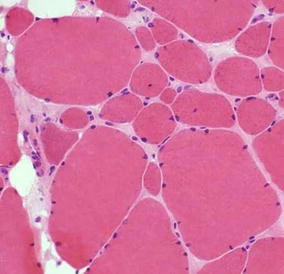
Hemoxylin & eosin stained muscle biopsy showing variable muscle fibre sizes in an 8 year old male with EDMD

A positive genetic test in a person with the signs and symptoms of EDMD provides a definitive diagnosis. Genetic testing can involve single-gene testing or genomic testing. Auxiliary testing can include the following:

- CAT scan
- Serum CK analysis
- EKG
- Echocardiogram
- Electromyogram
- Immunodetection

=== Differential diagnosis ===
Contractures manifest early in the disease course. Other diseases that have early or congenital contractures are diseases involving collagen mutations, including Ullrich congenital muscular dystrophy and Bethlem myopathy. SELENON-related myopathy and arthrogryposis multiplex congenita also cause congenital contractures.

Weakness initially affects the humeral and peroneal muscles, progressing to involve the scapular and pelvic muscles. Facioscapulohumeral muscular dystrophy has a similar muscle involvement pattern.

== Management ==
ACE inhibitor

Following diagnosis, the extent of the disease should be established regarding the heart, the lungs, and the muscles/bones (musculoskeletal). Metabolic functions should also be assessed, as lipodystrophy can co-occur with EDMD, by measuring levels of sugar, cholesterol, and triglycerides in the blood. Tests useful for heart evaluation include electrocardiography (EKG), echocardiography (echo), cardiac MRI, and electrophysiology studies. Musculoskeletal function can be assessed by a physical therapist or orthopedist. Regardless of the extent of the disease, cardiac and respiratory complications should be monitored. EKG, holter, and echo are recommended yearly, and additional tests can be indicated depending on heart involvement. Pulmonary function tests (PFTs) are recommended every 2–3 years, or yearly in those with respiratory involvement.

Although the root cause of EDMD is not currently treatable, its manifestations and complications can be treated. Heart involvement can be addressed with medications (antiarrhythmics, beta-blockers, and ACE inhibitors), pacemakers, defibrillators, and sometimes heart transplantation. Affecting breathing can be addressed with physical therapy and, later in the disease, mechanical ventilation. Contractures and scoliosis can be addressed with orthopedic surgery. Mobility can be improved with physical therapy, occupational therapy, and mechanical aids (canes, orthoses, wheelchairs).

== Epidemiology ==
It is rare, affecting 0.39 per 100,000 (1 per 250,000) people.

Type	Incidence
EDMD1	0.13 - 0.2 per 100,000
EDMD2	Majority of EDMD cases
EDMD3	10 reported cases
EDMD4	1 person
EDMD5	
EDMD6	1% of EDMD cases
EDMD7	

== See also ==
- Laminopathies
- Noncompaction cardiomyopathy
