= Alan Emery =

British medical geneticist

Professor Alan Emery
- Born: Alan Eglin Heathcote Emery; 1928 (age 97–98)
- Education: University of Manchester, Johns Hopkins University (Ph.D.)
- Occupation: Medical genetics
- Known for: Emery–Dreifuss muscular dystrophy and its defective protein product, emerin
- Scientific career
- Workplaces: University of Edinburgh, Green Templeton College, Oxford

Alan Eglin Heathcote Emery FRCP, FRCPE, , FLS, FRSA, FRSE (born August 21, 1928) is a British medical geneticist, known for his study of muscular dystrophy.

Emery began his working life in the King's Hussars, and graduated in biological sciences from University of Manchester. In 1960 he obtained his medical degree there.

His PhD in human genetics was earned at Johns Hopkins University.

In 1968 he became a foundation professor of human genetics at the University of Edinburgh.

Having established the European Neuromuscular Centre, he was its chief scientific advisor from 1999.

He was the first president of the Royal Society of Medicine’s Section of Medical Genetics, which he established, from 2001 to 2004.

He was a research fellow and subsequently an honorary fellow of Green Templeton College from 1985.

He was elected a Fellow of the Royal College of Physicians (FRCP), Fellow of the Royal College of Physicians of Edinburgh (FRCPE), a Fellow of the American College of Medical Genetics (FACMG), a Fellow of the Linnean Society (FLS), a Fellow of the Royal Society of Arts (FRSA) and a Fellow of the Royal Society of Edinburgh (FRSE).

Both Emery–Dreifuss muscular dystrophy and its first known defective protein product, emerin, are named after him (the former jointly with Fritz E. Dreifuss).
