= Type VI collagen =

Type of collagen protein

Collagen VI (ColVI) is a type of collagen primarily associated with the extracellular matrix of skeletal muscle. ColVI maintains regularity in muscle function and stabilizes the cell membrane. It is synthesized by a complex, multistep pathway that leads to the formation of a unique network of linked microfilaments located in the extracellular matrix (ECM). ColVI plays a vital role in numerous cell types, including chondrocytes, neurons, myocytes, fibroblasts, and cardiomyocytes. ColVI molecules are made up of three alpha chains: α1(VI), α2(VI), and α3(VI). It is encoded by 6 genes: COL6A1, COL6A2, COL6A3, COL6A4, COL6A5, and COL6A6. The chain lengths of α1(VI) and α2(VI) are about 1,000 amino acids. The chain length of α3(VI) is roughly a third larger than those of α1(VI) and α2(VI), and it consists of several spliced variants within the range of 2,500 to 3,100 amino acids.

The first two alpha chains subunits of ColVI have a molecular weight of 140-150 KDa and the third polypeptide chain is larger with a molecular weight of 250-300kDa. ColVI is also found in the skin, lungs, blood vessels, cornea and intervertebral disc. It also forms part of the peripheral nerves, brain, myocardium and adipose tissue.

== Function ==
Collagen VI plays many different roles in the cell depending on which tissue in which it is expressed. ColVI maintains a mechanical function in the cell, which is typical of most types of Collagen, by providing stability and structural support in the ECM. ColVI allows muscle cells to connect with the ECM by interacting with perlecan in the basal lamina. ColVI also functions as a cytoprotective agent:

1. ColVI plays an important role in cancer by acting as a chemotherapy resistance modulator.
2. ColVI inhibits oxidative damage and apoptosis.
3. ColVI regulates cell differentiation and autophagic machinery.
4. With the assistance of other collagens, proteoglycans, matrilineal, fibronectins, and glycoproteins, ColVI anchors the basement membrane of the skin to the extracellular matrix.

== Expression in various tissues ==
=== Muscle tissue ===
ColVI is one of the primary components of muscle extra cellular matrix. It has been shown to play an integral role in building the basement membrane of myofiber endomysium. The crucial role of ColVI in skeletal muscle can be seen by the fact that mutations in the genes responsible for encoding ColVI cause diseases affecting the function of skeletal muscle, including Ullrich congenital muscular dystrophy and Bethlem myopathy. Absence of ColVI in muscle cells results in muscle cell dysfunction due to defects in the regulation of the autophagic pathway. ColVI is also a key component of muscle cell generation, and has been shown to have the ability to regenerate itself.

=== Nervous tissue ===
ColVI is expressed in both the central nervous system and peripheral nervous system.

==== Central nervous system ====
The presence of ColVI in the brain was originally discovered in meningeal cells. ColVI has also been linked to the development of Alzheimer's disease. When treated with AB-peptides, mice without the COL6A1 gene were observed to have an increase in apoptosis compared to wild type mice, suggesting that ColVI plays a neuroprotective role against AB-peptide toxicity. Further, ColVI has been suggested to play an anti-apoptotic role in other parts of the nervous system, as seen in studies analyzing the effects of UV-induced apoptosis.

==== Peripheral nervous system ====
ColVI is expressed by Schwann cells in the peripheral nervous system. It is present in the connective tissue of the endoneurium, perineurium, and epineurium. ColVI has been shown to be expressed by immature Schwann cells when they begin to differentiate into myelinating cells, suggesting that ColVI plays an integral role in regulating Schwann cell differentiation. ColVI also plays a key role in the peripheral nervous system myelination and maintains proper functioning of the sciatic nerve.

=== Adipose tissue ===
ColVI also plays a key role in the extracellular matrix of white adipose tissue. Lack of ColVI in the extracellular matrix of white adipose tissue leads to molecular characteristic notably seen in obese individuals. Endotrophin, a peptide generated by ColVI in white adipose tissue, has been shown to promote the growth of breast cancer cells. Further, therapeutic transplantation of adipose-derived stem cells has been shown to secrete and assemble ColVI microfibrils.

==== Role of Collagen VI in knee function ====
Studies have revealed that the mutation or deletion of genes encoding for collagen VI can result in numerous musculoskeletal disorders, e.g. hip osteoarthritis, tissue fibrosis, tissue ossification, and muscular dystrophies. The deletion of the COL6A1 gene in mice was used to determine the function of collagen VI in the bone and cartilage of knee joints. The absence of collagen VI impacted the structure and shape of the knee joint, but did not critically affect physicality of the cartilage.

== Associated disorders ==
Defects in Collagen VI are associated with Ullrich congenital muscular dystrophy and Bethlem myopathy. Phenotypes associated with Ullrich congenital muscular dystrophy are typically more severe than phenotypes associated with Bethlem myopathy. Rare cases of collagen VI related myopathies with phenotypes of intermediate severity have been reported. Whole genome sequencing reveals that these intermediate phenotypes most likely result from a premature translation termination codon caused by a variation in the COL6A3 gene, as well as an amino acid substitution in the N2-terminal domain caused by nonsense-mediated decay. Biopsied muscle tissue samples in individuals with Ullrich congenital muscular dystrophy and Bethlem myopathy showed a significant decrease in protein levels of Beclin1 and VNIP3, demonstrating that mutated ColVI causes defect in the regulation of autophagic pathways. In the absence of any proven therapeutic agents for treatment, a global registry is intended to facilitate matching people living with the conditions with potential clinical trials. At present the primary methods of treating these disorders are surgery and physical therapy.

=== Ullrich congenital muscular dystrophy ===
Ullrich congenital muscular dystrophy (UCMD) is a condition that primarily affects the function of skeletal muscles. UCMD has been associated with mutations in the COL6A1, COL6A2, and COL6A3 gene. The most common pattern of inheritance for UCMD is autosomal recessive, although an autosomal dominant pattern of inheritance is observed in rare cases.

==== Symptoms ====
- Severe weakness and atrophy of skeletal muscles
- Contractures in knees and elbows
- Hyper-mobility in wrists and ankles
- Rigid spine

==== Treatments ====
The most common treatment for individuals affected by Ullrich congenital muscular dystrophy is physical therapy, with an emphasis on the mobilization and stabilization of affected joints. Surgical interventions may be needed to correct contractures or scoliosis.

=== Bethlem myopathy ===
Bethlem myopathy is the mildest form of Collagen VI related myopathies. Related symptoms include ligamentous laxity, hypotonia in infancy, and difficulty breathing due to weakness in respiratory muscles. Bethlem myopathy affects approximately 1 in 200,000 people.
