= C62H111N11O12 =

The molecular formula C_{62}H_{111}N_{11}O_{12} (molar mass: 1202.611 g/mol, exact mass: 1201.841 u) may refer to:

- Ciclosporin
- NIM811
