= Muscle contracture =

Permanent shortening of a muscle

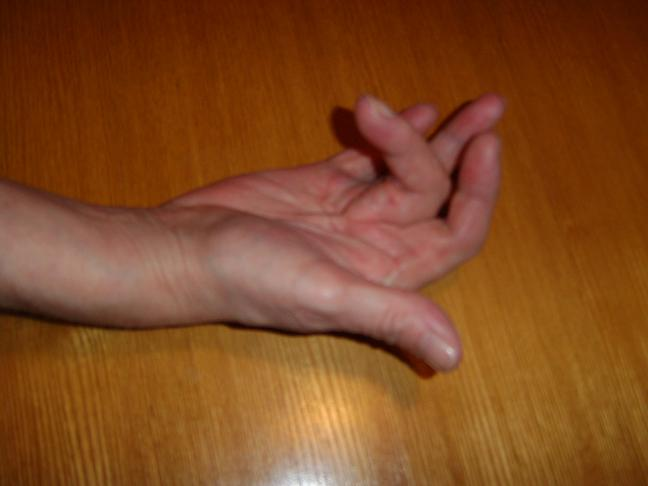
A finger contracture caused by Dupuytren's contracture.

Muscle contractures can occur for many reasons, such as paralysis, muscular atrophy, and forms of muscular dystrophy. Fundamentally, the muscle and its tendons shorten, resulting in reduced flexibility.

Various interventions can slow, stop, or even reverse muscle contractures, ranging from physical therapy to surgery.

== Cause ==
=== Immobilization ===
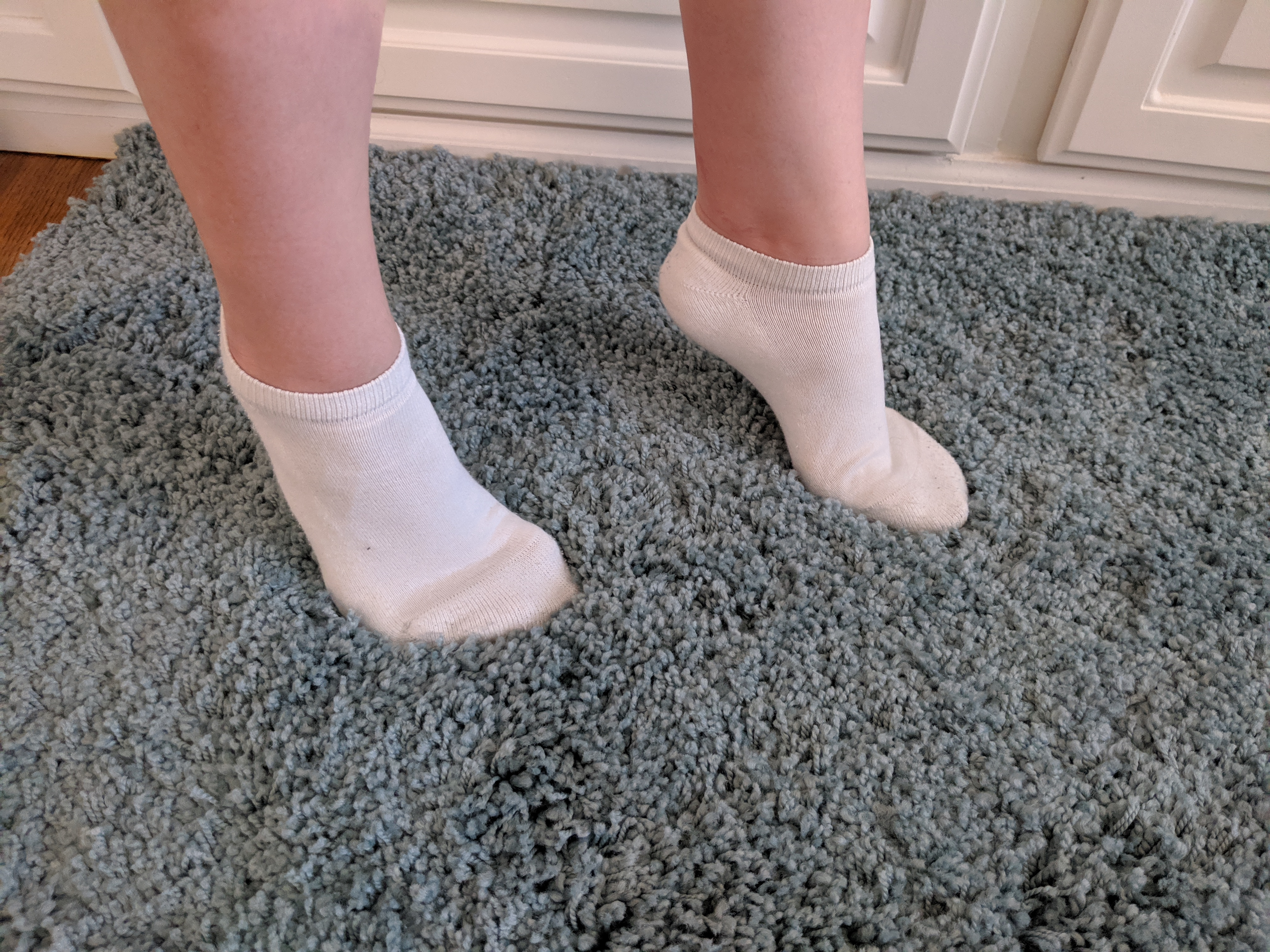
Toe walking in an autistic individual

Joints are usually immobilized in a shortened position resulting in changes within the joint connective tissue, and the length of the muscle and associated tendon. Prolonged immobilization facilitates tissue proliferation which impinges on the joint space. Maintaining a shortened position for a prolonged period of time leads to: fibrous adhesion formation, loss of sarcomeres, and a loss of tissue extensibility.

For example, after a fracture when immobilization is done by casting the limb in plaster of paris, the muscle length shortens because the muscle is not used for a large span of time.

A common cause for having the ankle lose its flexibility in this manner is from having sheets tucked in at the foot of the bed when sleeping. The weight of the sheets keep the feet plantarflexed all night. By not tucking the sheets in at the foot of the bed, or by sleeping with the feet hanging off the bed when in the prone position, is part of correcting this imbalance.

Due to sensory issues, some autistic people prefer to toe walk instead of their feet making full contact with the ground. Chronic toe walking leads to muscle contracture due to the lack of calf muscles being adequately stretched. Once the muscle contracture has developed, the voluntary toe walking then becomes involuntary. If someone has a disability that causes spasticity (such as cerebral palsy), they may walk on their toes involuntarily.

=== Spasticity ===
If spasticity is left untreated, contractures can occur. A loss of muscle tone inhibition (hypertonia) causes a muscle to become hyperactive resulting in constant contraction, which reduces an individual's control of the affected area. The joint will remain in a flexed state producing similar effects as listed in immobilization.

=== Muscle imbalance ===
A muscle imbalance between an agonist and antagonist muscle can occur due to a neurological disorder, spinal cord injury, myopathy, and our lifestyle/postural habits. One muscle may be normal while the other is atrophic or hypertrophic; alternately, one muscle may be hypertrophic while the other is atrophic. A decrease in muscle tone leads to continuous disuse and eventually muscular atrophy. The constant contraction of the agonist muscle with minimal resistance can result in a contracture. Selective muscle hypertrophy may exacerbate contractures and postural instability.

For example, in the case of partial paralysis (i.e. poliomyelitis) the loss of strength and muscle control tend to be greater in some muscles than in others, leading to an imbalance between the various muscle groups around specific joints. Case in point: when the muscles which dorsiflex (flex the foot upward) are less functional than the muscles which plantarflex (flex the foot downward) a contracture occurs, giving the foot a progressively downward angle and loss of flexibility.

=== Low ATP reservoir in the muscle ===
In the metabolic myopathies of GSD-V (McArdle disease) and GSD-VII (Tarui disease), temporary muscle contractures develop in response to impending muscle damage associated with the ATP (energy) deficiency. The muscle contracts and fails to relax again, becoming hard or stiff, the muscle may swell up, and although temporary, it is longer lasting and generally more painful than muscle cramps. These contractures are different from cramps, because they are not elicited by the nerve, but by intrinsic mechanisms in the muscle itself and are silent on electromyography. This type of transient contracture has also been called pseudomyotonia.

In GSD-V and GSD-VII, a cramp or contracture is managed by cessation of the causal activity until pain resolves; however, repeated episodes can accumulate muscle damage (see below under fibrosis). Unlike stretching of muscle cramps, stretching of a muscle in contracture should be avoided as it may cause further muscle damage by tearing muscle fibres (i.e. resist uncurling the fingers of a "clawed" hand).

=== Congenital muscular dystrophies ===
Some congenital muscular dystrophies, such as Bethlem myopathy, Ullrich congenital muscular dystrophy, Merosin-deficient congenital muscular dystrophy (MDC1A) or LAMA2-related CMD, rigid spine syndrome and LMNA-related congenital muscular dystrophy cause muscle contractures to develop. In Bethlem myopathy and Ullrich congenital muscular dystrophy, mutations in collagen VI and XII genes result in deficient or dysfunctional microfibrillar collagen in the extracellular matrix of muscle and other connective tissues. The potential effects on muscle include progressive dystrophic changes, fibrosis and evidence for increased apoptosis. In Bethlem myopathy 1, contractures presenting in infancy may resolve by age 2 years, but reoccur as the disease progresses, typically by late of the first decade or early teens.

=== Congenital myopathies ===
Congenital myopathy such as, core myopathies, nemaline myopathies and centronuclear myopathies and so forth can result in muscle contractures of the extremities and spine.

=== Ischemia ===
Following trauma (such as fractures, crush injuries, burns and arterial injuries), ischemia (restriction of blood flow) leads to the death of muscle tissue (necrosis) and can cause contracture, such as Volkmann's contracture.

=== Adhesions and fibrosis ===
Adhesions bind two separate tissues or organs together with fibrotic scar tissue, joining muscle fibres to facia, ligaments, or joints. Fibrosis occurs within the same organ, the fibrotic scar tissue within skeletal muscle known as myofibrosis, limits muscle contractibility and stiffens muscles.

Muscle injury (such as a large burn or surgery) can cause muscle contractures as internal scar tissue (adhesions and fibrosis) develops. Repetitive muscle injuries (e.g. sports injuries, major muscle strains) and micro-injuries (e.g. overuse injuries, minor muscle strains) can also cause this. Adhesions and fibrosis are made of dense fibrous tissue, which are strong and supportive, helping to prevent the injury or micro-injury from reoccurring. However, the fibrotic scar tissue causes the muscle tissue to become stuck together which restricts movement, causing pain, weakness, and limited joint mobility.

== Treatment ==
=== Passive stretching ===
Typically performed by physical therapists, passive stretching is a more beneficial preventative measure and tool to maintain available range of motion (ROM) rather than used as a treatment. It is very important to continually move the limb throughout its full range at a specific velocity but a passive stretch can't be maintained for the period of time required for optimal benefit.

A 2017 Cochrane review found that stretching does not provide any short-term pain relief.

=== Splinting ===
A contracture corrective device (CCD) is a dynamic splint that provides a continuous stretch with a continuous force and operates based on the principles of creep. It is the most advantageous splint but more research is required. Splints are used in long-term treatments and must be removed in order to stretch the antagonist muscle to maintain range of motion (passive stretching).

=== Electrical stimulation ===
Electrical stimulation improves passive range of motion but only temporarily. Once the treatment is withdrawn, all benefits are reduced. It can play a critical role in muscle atrophy prevention.

=== Surgery ===
Surgery is a solution to muscle shortening but other complications may arise. Following muscle lengthening surgery, force production and ROM is usually reduced due to the shift in sarcomere locations between a muscle's maximal and minimal length. In adjunct with surgery, refractory muscle contracture can also be treated with Botulinum toxins A and B; however, the effectiveness of the toxin is slowly lost over time, and most patients need a single treatment to correct muscle contracture over the first few weeks after surgery. Shortening of the surgically lengthened muscle can re-occur.
