= Fritz E. Dreifuss =

American neurologist

- Born: January 20, 1926
- Died: October 18, 1997 (aged 71)

Fritz E. Dreifuss, MD (January 20, 1926 – October 18, 1997) was a German-born, New Zealand-educated, American neurologist and subspecialist in epilepsy based at the University of Virginia in Charlottesville, Virginia, US.

== Early life ==
Dreifuss was born in Dresden, Germany. To escape German state persecution of Jews, the Dreifuss family emigrated to New Zealand, arriving in 1937. His father began a general practice in medicine.

== Education ==
Fritz was educated at Wanganui Collegiate and the University of Otago, from where he graduated MB ChB (NZ) in 1951. He trained in neurology at Auckland Hospital, New Zealand, and the National Hospital for Neurology and Neurosurgery (Queen Square/NHNN) in London, England.

== Early career ==
In 1959 he was hired as a faculty neurologist at the University of Virginia. During his first faculty year, he also worked as a medical intern at a regional hospital to be eligible for a Virginia medical license.

== Clinical practice and the Comprehensive Epilepsy Center ==
Dreifuss’ clinical and research career centered on the evaluation and treatment of epilepsy in children and adults. In 1959, he was named head of the Commonwealth of Virginia's Child Neurology Program. To fulfill this mission, he formed a series of satellite field clinics around the Commonwealth to provide state-of-the-art neurological care in regions remote from main medical centers at a time when neurologists were few. He maintained this clinics throughout his career in collaboration with colleague James Q. Miller. Although the emphasis was on epilepsy, patients with a wide range of neurological disorders were served. Three Appalachian field clinics in Tazewell, Wise, and Bristol, Virginia continue to be staffed by University of Virginia neurologists.

In the 1960s he and several colleagues in the US, especially Kiffin Penry, created the concept of subspecialty epilepsy care represented as the Comprehensive Epilepsy Program. This approach gathered clinical neurologists, pediatric neurologists, electrophysiologists, specialized nursing, educational consultants, and psychologists with the common mission of epilepsy care. In 1974 Dreifuss competed successfully for an NIH-sponsored grant for the formation of a comprehensive epilepsy center, forming one of the three original centers in the US. An integral part of a comprehensive epilepsy center was the development of feasible long-term monitoring methods with the use of simultaneous video-EEG in order to best diagnose and characterize epileptic seizures. With electrophysiology colleagues, Dreifuss aided in the development of the video-EEG system and was one of its early adopters in clinical epilepsy research.

Although his specialty was epilepsy, Dreifuss published extensively in clinical descriptions within other neurological fields. In 1961 Dreifuss and colleagues described a family with form of muscular dystrophy distinct from more severe Duchenne and Becker muscular dystrophies. This syndrome is now designated Emery–Dreifuss muscular dystrophy.

== Clinical research ==
With collaborator Kiffin Penry and others and with the use of advanced video-EEG techniques, Dreifuss investigated the correlations between the clinical symptoms of absence seizures and their accompaniments on EEG. Dreifuss established that the generalized, 3 Hz, spike-wave discharge is accompanied by loss of attention and, sometimes, minor motor automatisms; even brief discharges have momentary clinical significance. Accordingly, treatment of absence epilepsy could be accurately measured by tracking the amount of spike-wave discharges captured via EEG

Dreifuss used these techniques and others in the process of development of anticonvulsant medications for use in absence epilepsy as well as in other epileptic conditions. He was instrumental in the first publications in the use of sodium valproate in the US in 1976, and in 1996 described those at most risk for side effects in the use of this medication.

== Classification of the epilepsies ==
Arguably his most important contribution was to head the international commission for standardization of terminology and classification of the epilepsies His classification, arrived at through a combination of clinical relevance and diplomacy, stands still as the international standard. The standardization of terms have allowed research protocols and clinical practice to discuss the epilepsies in a common language.

== Awards, offices, and recognitions ==
At the University of Virginia, Dreifuss achieved the title of full Professor of Neurology in 1968 and was awarded the first T.R. Johns Chair of Neurology in 1990 and the Worrell Chair in 1993. He was nominated as vice chair of the department in 1974 and served as interim chair in the department's transition from the leadership of T.R. Johns to G. Frederick Wooten.

He was president of the American Epilepsy Society in 1978, Chairman of the Professional Advisor Board of the Epilepsy Foundation of America (EFA) from 1978 to 1980, President of EFA from 1983 to 1985, chairman of the Board of EFA from 1987 to 1989, secretary-general of the International League Against Epilepsy (ILAE) from 1981 to 1985, and President of ILAE from 1985 to 1989. He, in collaboration with colleague Soo Ik Lee taught a variety of fellows in clinical epilepsy and clinical neurophysiology. He was named an Ambassador for Epilepsy in 1979, was the winner of the William G. Lennox Award of AES in 1983, and was the AES Lennox lecturer in 1986. He received the AES Distinguished Clinical Investigator Award in 1991 and the ILAE Epileptology Prize in 1995. He received the EFA 25th Anniversary Award in 1993. In 2001, the American Academy of Neurology posthumously designated the annual Dreifuss-Penry Award for outstanding career contributions in epileptology.

== Pop culture references ==
Severed Heads, an Australian industrial pop group active in the 1980s, released on their 1983 album “Since the Accident” a cut entitled “Epilepsy ‘82”. This song featured a recording of one of Dreifuss’ lectures on the classification of the epilepsies as background.
