= NIM811 =

Names
- Other names N-Methyl-4-isoleucine cyclosporin

Identifiers
| CAS Number | 143205-42-9 |
| 3D model (JSmol) | Interactive image |
| ChEMBL | ChEMBL1688529 |
| ChemSpider | 4976066 |
| DrugBank | DB13068 |
| PubChem CID | 6473876 |
| UNII | 96262S4I14 |
| CompTox Dashboard (EPA) | DTXSID70904006 |
- InChI: InChI=1S/C62H111N11O12/c1-25-28-29-40(15)52(75)51-56(79)65-43(27-3)58(81)67(18)33-47(74)71(22)50(39(14)26-2)55(78)66-48(37(10)11)61(84)68(19)44(30-34(4)5)54(77)63-41(16)53(76)64-42(17)57(80)69(20)45(31-35(6)7)59(82)70(21)46(32-36(8)9)60(83)72(23)49(38(12)13)62(85)73(51)24/h25,28,34-46,48-52,75H,26-27,29-33H2,1-24H3,(H,63,77)(H,64,76)(H,65,79)(H,66,78)/b28-25+/t39-,40+,41-,42+,43-,44-,45-,46-,48-,49-,50-,51-,52+/m0/s1 Key: RPJPZDVUUKWPGT-FOIHOXPVSA-N
- SMILES: CC[C@H]1C(=O)N(CC(=O)N([C@H](C(=O)N[C@H](C(=O)N([C@H](C(=O)N[C@H](C(=O)N[C@@H](C(=O)N([C@H](C(=O)N([C@H](C(=O)N([C@H](C(=O)N([C@H](C(=O)N1)[C@@H]([C@H](C)C\C=C\C)O)C)C(C)C)C)CC(C)C)C)CC(C)C)C)C)C)CC(C)C)C)C(C)C)[C@@H](C)CC)C)C

Properties
| Chemical formula | C_{62}H_{111}N_{11}O_{12} |
| Molar mass | 1202.635 g·mol^{−1} |
- Except where otherwise noted, data are given for materials in their standard state (at 25 °C [77 °F], 100 kPa). verify (what is ?) Infobox references

NIM811 is a mitochondrial permeability transition inhibitor. Also known as N-methyl-4-isoleucine cyclosporin, it is a substituted cyclosporine analog that binds to cyclophilin; however, this binary complex cannot bind to calcineurin, and therefore lacks immunosuppressive activity.

NIM811 is a form of treatment for patients with the hepatitis C virus (HCV). Studies indicate a strong relationship between a treatment's cyclophilin binding affinity and suppression of HCV activity. NIM811 is also being studied as a potential treatment to genetic muscular diseases such as Ullrich congenital muscular dystrophy (UCMD) and Bethlem myopathy (BM) disease, diseases altering the genes for collagen VI production.
