= Collagen, type VI, alpha 1 =

Protein found in humans

COL6A1

Identifiers
- Aliases: COL6A1, OPLL, BTHLM1, UCHMD1, collagen type VI alpha 1, collagen type VI alpha 1 chain
- External IDs: OMIM: 120220; MGI: 88459; GeneCards: COL6A1

Gene location (Human)
Chr.	Chromosome 21 (human)
Band	21q22.3	Start	45,981,770 bp
Band	21q22.3	End	46,005,050 bp

Gene location (Mouse)
Chr.	Chromosome 10 (mouse)
Band	10 C1|10 39.71 cM	Start	76,544,626 bp
Band	10 C1|10 39.71 cM	End	76,562,002 bp
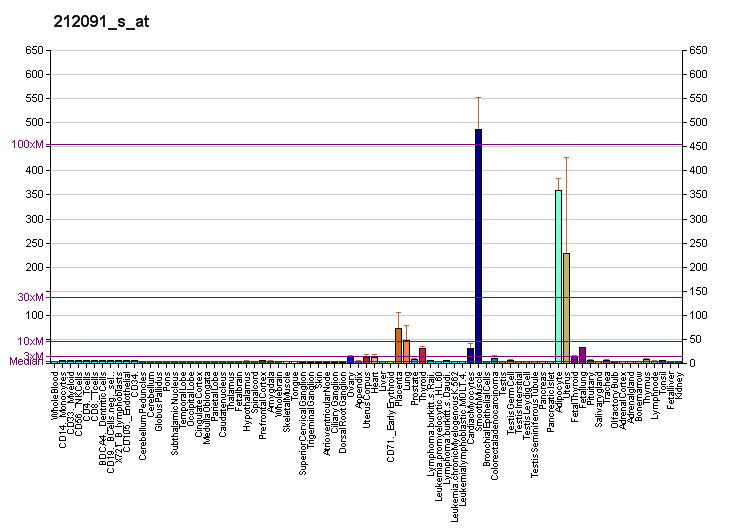

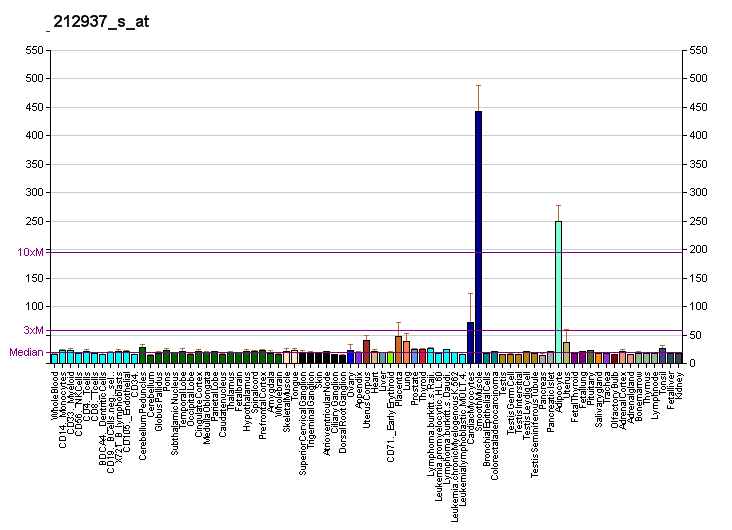

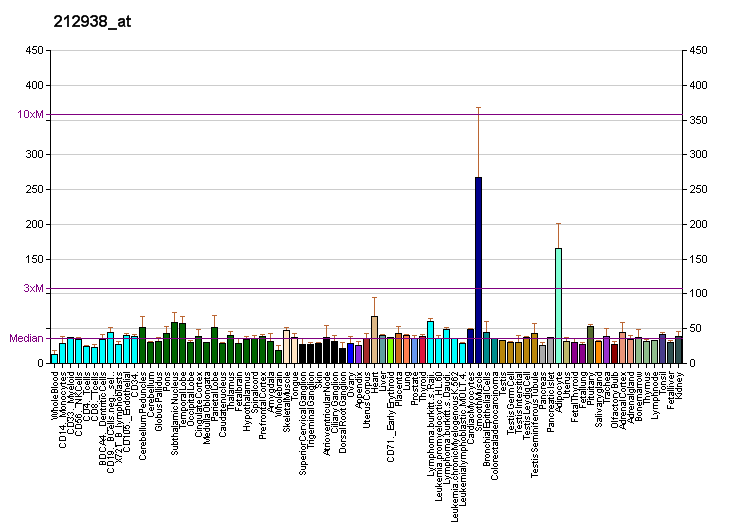
RNA expression pattern
Bgee	Human / Mouse (ortholog); Top expressed in: stromal cell of endometrium; tendon of biceps brachii; body of uterus; muscle layer of sigmoid colon; left uterine tube; saphenous vein; right ovary; canal of the cervix; skin of hip; left ovary / Top expressed in: efferent ductule; umbilical cord; calvaria; internal carotid artery; ankle joint; uterus; ankle; cervix; left lung lobe; vas deferens; More reference expression data
BioGPS	More reference expression data
Gene ontology
Molecular function	platelet-derived growth factor binding; extracellular matrix structural constituent conferring tensile strength
Cellular component	extracellular matrix; extracellular region; collagen type VI trimer; lysosomal membrane; sarcolemma; collagen; endoplasmic reticulum lumen; extracellular exosome; membrane; extracellular space; protein-containing complex; collagen-containing extracellular matrix
Biological process	collagen catabolic process; cellular response to amino acid stimulus; protein heterotrimerization; cell adhesion; extracellular matrix organization; endodermal cell differentiation; osteoblast differentiation; growth plate cartilage chondrocyte morphogenesis
Sources:Amigo / QuickGO
Orthologs
Databases	NCBI: entry; OMA: entry
Species	Human	Mouse
Entrez	1291	12833
Ensembl	ENSG00000142156	ENSMUSG00000001119
UniProt	P12109	Q04857
RefSeq (mRNA)	NM_001848	NM_009933
RefSeq (protein)	NP_001839	NP_034063
Location (UCSC)	Chr 21: 45.98 – 46.01 Mb	Chr 10: 76.54 – 76.56 Mb
PubMed search
- Wikidata
View/Edit Human	View/Edit Mouse

Collagen alpha-1(VI) chain is a protein that in humans is encoded by the COL6A1 gene.

== Function ==
The collagens are a superfamily of proteins that play a role in maintaining the integrity of various tissues. Collagens are extracellular matrix proteins and have a triple-helical domain as their common structural element. Collagen VI is a major structural component of microfibrils. The basic structural unit of collagen VI is a heterotrimer of the alpha1(VI), alpha2(VI), and alpha3(VI) chains. The alpha2(VI) and alpha3(VI) chains are encoded by the COL6A2 and COL6A3 genes, respectively. The protein encoded by this gene is the alpha 1 subunit of type VI collagen (alpha1(VI) chain). Pathogenic variants in these genes are associated with collagen VI-related dystrophies, a spectrum of disorders that includes Bethlem muscular dystrophy, intermediate collagen VI-related dystrophy, and Ullrich congenital muscular dystrophy.
