= Otto Ullrich =

German pediatrician

Otto Ullrich (1894-1957) was a German pediatrician who identified and named Ullrich syndrome.

== Biography ==
After Otto Ullrich studied medicine at the Ludwig-Maximilians-Universität München, he served as an assistant physician in the medical corps during World War I. Following the war, he worked at the Ludwig-Maximilians-Universität München; with the chairman of pediatrics, professor Meinhard von Pfaundler (1872-1947). Ullrich was influenced by Pfaundler in his interest in medical genetics.

In 1922, Ullrich served as director of the policlinic and in 1929 achieved faculty status. In 1934, he moved to Berlin as director of the National Centre to Combat Infant Mortality, a post for which knowledge of human genetics was a prerequisite. Ullrich, however, did not enjoy working under the political atmosphere in Berlin, and after six months, he shifted to Essen, as director of the Municipal Children's Hospital. In 1939, Ullrich was called to the chair of paediatrics at Rostock and in 1943 he took up the position in Bonn, where he remained until his death in 1957.

Ullrich's achievements were honoured for excellence in medical genetics in 1991 by the establishment of the Otto Ullrich medal. The creation of this award was announced in the American Journal of Medical Genetics, in an edition which contained an editorial and several articles pertaining to Ullrich and his scientific achievements.

Hans-Rudolf Wiedemann, professor emeritus of Kiel University and Ullrich's former chief resident, rendered this account of his mentor's professional and personal attributes:

As physician, Ullrich was very broad based. At the bedside he was patient and was quickly to win the trust of the child. He examined very calmly and was an excellent observer with a capacity to take in the essentials of the case at a glance. The laboratory data were reviewed routinely but were never overemphasised, quite in the highly critical and analytical Munich spirit. His special ability to retain and to recall previous cases allowed Ullrich to make correct diagnoses with surprising ease. His rounds were as punctual as clockwork and very thorough, offering a wealth of information and experienced counsel, enriched by his critical perspective and pronounced distaste against hastiness, especially in therapy. This was not only a result of his Munich background but also reflected his personal inclination. As a human being Otto Ullrich had a gracious and noble personality, with a compelling glance and a care for moderation and compromise. Apart from professional contacts, Ullrich could be reserved with younger co-workers; however, when he was able to open himself to others he always engendered much joy."
