= Collagen, type VI, alpha 5 =

Protein found in humans

COL6A5

Identifiers
- Aliases: COL6A5, collagen, type VI, alpha 5, COL29A1, VWA4, collagen type VI alpha 5, collagen type VI alpha 5 chain
- External IDs: OMIM: 611916; MGI: 3648134; GeneCards: COL6A5

Gene location (Human)
Chr.	Chromosome 3 (human)
Band	3q22.1	Start	130,345,516 bp
Band	3q22.1	End	130,484,844 bp

Gene location (Mouse)
Chr.	Chromosome 9 (mouse)
Band	9 F1|9	Start	105,733,277 bp
Band	9 F1|9	End	105,837,842 bp
RNA expression pattern
Bgee	Human / Mouse (ortholog); Top expressed in: skin of thigh; testicle; upper lobe of left lung; skin of hip; right lung; lower lobe of lung; duodenum; skin of abdomen; visceral pleura; left testis / Top expressed in: primary oocyte; secondary oocyte; white adipose tissue; ovary; urinary bladder; zygote; colon; esophagus; hypothalamus; adrenal gland; More reference expression data
BioGPS	n/a
Gene ontology
Molecular function	protein binding; extracellular matrix structural constituent conferring tensile strength
Cellular component	collagen; extracellular matrix; extracellular region; collagen-containing extracellular matrix
Biological process	cell adhesion
Sources:Amigo / QuickGO
Orthologs
Databases	NCBI: entry; OMA: entry
Species	Human	Mouse
Entrez	256076	665033
Ensembl	ENSG00000172752	ENSMUSG00000091345
UniProt	A8TX70; H0Y935	A6H584
RefSeq (mRNA)	NM_001278298; NM_153264	NM_001167923
RefSeq (protein)	NP_001265227; NP_694996	NP_001161395
Location (UCSC)	Chr 3: 130.35 – 130.48 Mb	Chr 9: 105.73 – 105.84 Mb
PubMed search
- Wikidata
View/Edit Human	View/Edit Mouse

Collagen alpha-5(VI) chain also known as von Willebrand factor A domain-containing protein 4 is a protein that in humans is encoded by the COL6A5 gene.

COL6A5 is a part of the Collagen VI gene family which produce collagen components for the Extracellular matrix of most connective tissues. In the human genome, part of the collagen VI family is located on chromosome 3q in order of COL6A4, COL6A5, COL6A6. Transcription of COL6A5 only occurs in skin, lung, testis, colon, and small intestine cells.
