= Dystrophinopathy =

- Specialty: Neurology
- Duration: Long term
- Types: Duchenne muscular dystrophy, Becker muscular dystrophy, DMD-associated dilated cardiomyopathy
- Causes: Genetic (inherited or new mutation)
- Diagnostic method: Genetic testing

Dystrophinopathy refers to a spectrum of diseases due to mutations in the DMD gene, which encodes for the dystrophin protein found in muscle. The severe end of the spectrum includes Duchenne muscular dystrophy (DMD), Becker muscular dystrophy (BMD), and DMD-associated dilated cardiomyopathy. The mild end of the spectrum includes asymptomatic increases in serum creatine kinase and muscle cramps with myoglobinuria. Because dystrophin is located on the X chromosome, dystrophinopathy mainly affects males, whereas females range from being carriers, to having delayed-onset and mild disease, to having severe DMD.
