= TMEM43 =

Protein-coding gene in the species Homo sapiens

Identifiers
- Aliases: TMEM43, ARVC5, ARVD5, EDMD7, LUMA, transmembrane protein 43, AUNA3, EDMD7; AUNA2
- External IDs: OMIM: 612048; MGI: 1921372; HomoloGene: 11532; GeneCards: TMEM43; OMA:TMEM43 - orthologs

Gene location (Human)
Chr.	Chromosome 3 (human)
Band	3p25.1	Start	14,125,015 bp
Band	3p25.1	End	14,143,680 bp

Gene location (Mouse)
Chr.	Chromosome 6 (mouse)
Band	6|6 D1	Start	91,450,685 bp
Band	6|6 D1	End	91,465,445 bp
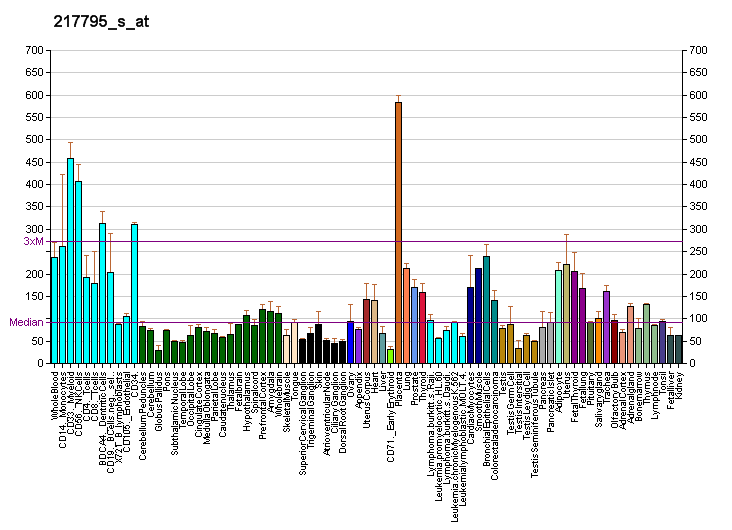
RNA expression pattern
Bgee	Human / Mouse (ortholog); Top expressed in: Descending thoracic aorta; ascending aorta; right coronary artery; tibial arteries; skin of abdomen; skin of hip; skin of leg; tendon of biceps brachii; left coronary artery; body of uterus / Top expressed in: lactiferous gland; lip; granulocyte; esophagus; calvaria; ascending aorta; stroma of bone marrow; white adipose tissue; ankle; muscle of thigh; More reference expression data
BioGPS	More reference expression data
Gene ontology
Molecular function	protein binding; protein self-association
Cellular component	integral component of membrane; nuclear inner membrane; Golgi apparatus; endoplasmic reticulum; membrane; nucleus; integral component of nuclear inner membrane; endoplasmic reticulum lumen
Biological process	nuclear membrane organization
Sources:Amigo / QuickGO
Orthologs
Species	Human	Mouse
Entrez	79188	74122
Ensembl	ENSG00000170876	ENSMUSG00000030095
UniProt	Q9BTV4	Q9DBS1
RefSeq (mRNA)	NM_024334	NM_028766
RefSeq (protein)	NP_077310	NP_083042
Location (UCSC)	Chr 3: 14.13 – 14.14 Mb	Chr 6: 91.45 – 91.47 Mb
PubMed search
- Wikidata
View/Edit Human	View/Edit Mouse

Transmembrane protein 43 (also called luma) is a protein that in humans is encoded by the TMEM43 gene. TMEM43 may have an important role in maintaining nuclear envelope structure by organizing protein complexes at the inner nuclear membrane. Required for retaining emerin at the inner nuclear membrane. However, the localization of TMEM43 in myocardial tissue is controversial discussed. Franke et al. demonstrated that TMEM43 is localized at the intercalated disc but not at the nuclear envelope. In contrast Christensen et al. have shown that TMEM43 is mainly localized at the sarcolemma. Mutations in TMEM43 are associated with ARVD and EDMD7.
