= James Q. Miller =

American neurologist

James Q. Miller, MD (July 6, 1926 – May 15, 2005) was an American neurologist and educator in neurology based at the University of Virginia in Charlottesville, Virginia, USA.

== Early life and education ==
He was born James Quinter Miller in Ohio. His undergraduate education was at Haverford College near Philadelphia, Pennsylvania and his medical degree from the Columbia Medical School in New York City. He was one of the first neurology residents at the Department of Neurology of the University of Virginia in Charlottesville, Virginia. He received additional training in neuropathology, genetics, and child neurology at the Massachusetts General Hospital in Boston, Massachusetts. He enlisted in the Air Force and served as a physician at the base in Newfoundland, Canada.

== Clinical practice and research ==
In 1962 he was hired as a faculty neurologist at the University of Virginia.

He established the first cytogenetics laboratory in Virginia. In this capacity, he established statewide screening programs for sickle cell disease and heritable neurological disease. One of his early papers was his description of two siblings with lissencephaly, now known by the eponym Miller–Dieker syndrome.

Although his main early interests were in neurogenetics and inflammatory diseases of the nervous system, he maintained activities in most of the subspecialty fields of neurology. In collaboration with his colleague Fritz E. Dreifuss, he helped maintain a system of field clinics administered by the Commonwealth of Virginia’s Child Neurology Program. Although the emphasis was on epilepsy, patients with a wide range of neurological disorders were served. Three Appalachian field clinics in Tazewell, Wise, and Bristol, Virginia continue to be staffed by University of Virginia neurologists.

He established one of the early comprehensive multiple sclerosis programs and was highly active in promoting research and participating in regional and national support groups and educatory efforts for multiple sclerosis patients. In his honor, the current multiple sclerosis program at the University of Virginia is entitled the “James Q. Miller Center for Multiple Sclerosis”.

== Leadership in neurology education ==
The main focus of Miller’s career was in the development of methods of medical student education in neurology was an American neurologist and educator in neurology based at the University of Virginia in Charlottesville, Virginia, USA.. His interests lead to his appointment as Assistant Dean of Students at the University of Virginia and to the state Council on Medical Education. He received the Robley Dunglison Award, an award presented annually by U.Va medical students in recognition of teaching excellence, a record 3 times, and was also a recipient of the University-wide Harrison Teaching Award, the American Academy of Neurology's A.B. Baker Award, and the American Neurological Association's Distinguished Teacher Award. His publications include a program of teaching tapes available for self-study for medical students and the study-aide Neurology Recall.
