= Collagen, type XII, alpha 1 =

Protein found in humans

COL12A1

Identifiers
- Aliases: COL12A1, BA209D8.1, COL12A1L, DJ234P15.1, BTHLM2, UCMD2, collagen type XII alpha 1, collagen type XII alpha 1 chain, EDSMYP
- External IDs: OMIM: 120320; MGI: 88448; GeneCards: COL12A1

Gene location (Human)
Chr.	Chromosome 6 (human)
Band	6q13-q14.1	Start	75,084,326 bp
Band	6q13-q14.1	End	75,206,267 bp

Gene location (Mouse)
Chr.	Chromosome 9 (mouse)
Band	9 E1|9 43.82 cM	Start	79,506,273 bp
Band	9 E1|9 43.82 cM	End	79,626,113 bp
RNA expression pattern
Bgee	Human / Mouse (ortholog); Top expressed in: tibia; Achilles tendon; cartilage tissue; stromal cell of endometrium; skin of arm; pericardium; synovial joint; vulva; tail of epididymis; synovial membrane / Top expressed in: body of femur; calvaria; umbilical cord; dermis; stroma of bone marrow; molar; vas deferens; human fetus; efferent ductule; external carotid artery; More reference expression data
BioGPS	n/a
Gene ontology
Molecular function	extracellular matrix structural constituent conferring tensile strength
Cellular component	extracellular vesicle; collagen type XII trimer; collagen; endoplasmic reticulum lumen; extracellular exosome; extracellular space; extracellular matrix; extracellular region; collagen-containing extracellular matrix
Biological process	collagen catabolic process; skeletal system development; cell adhesion; endodermal cell differentiation; collagen fibril organization; growth plate cartilage chondrocyte morphogenesis
Sources:Amigo / QuickGO
Orthologs
Databases	NCBI: entry; OMA: entry
Species	Human	Mouse
Entrez	1303	12816
Ensembl	ENSG00000111799	ENSMUSG00000032332
UniProt	Q99715	Q60847
RefSeq (mRNA)	NM_004370; NM_080645	NM_001290308; NM_007730
RefSeq (protein)	NP_004361; NP_542376	NP_001277237
Location (UCSC)	Chr 6: 75.08 – 75.21 Mb	Chr 9: 79.51 – 79.63 Mb
PubMed search
- Wikidata
View/Edit Human	View/Edit Mouse

Collagen alpha-1(XII) chain is a protein that in humans is encoded by the COL12A1 gene.

This gene encodes the alpha chain of type XII collagen, a member of the FACIT (fibril-associated collagens with interrupted triple helices) collagen family. Type XII collagen is a homotrimer found in association with type I collagen, an association that is thought to modify the interactions between collagen I fibrils and the surrounding matrix.

Alternatively spliced transcript variants encoding different isoforms have been identified.

== Clinical significance ==
Mutations in COL12A1 are known to cause the following conditions:

- Bethlem myopathy 2 (also known as Ehlers–Danlos syndrome myopathic type);
- Ullrich congenital muscular dystrophy 2.
