= T.R. Johns =

American neurologist (1924–1988)

Thomas Richard Johns II, MD (August 25, 1924 in Fairmont, West Virginia – February 11, 1988 in Charlottesville, Virginia) was an American neurologist, a subspecialist in neuromuscular disease, and a clinical researcher on myasthenia gravis based at the University of Virginia. Johns founded the Department of Neurology in 1963 and was its first chairman. He graduated from Harvard College and Harvard Medical School.
