= SUN domain-containing protein 2 =

Protein-coding gene in the species Homo sapiens

SUN2

Identifiers
- Aliases: SUN2, UNC84B, Sad1 and UNC84 domain containing 2
- External IDs: OMIM: 613569; MGI: 2443011; GeneCards: SUN2
Available structures
PDB	Ortholog search: PDBe RCSB
PDB	List of PDB id codes 3UNP, 4DXS, 4DXT, 4FI9

Gene location (Human)
Chr.	Chromosome 22 (human)
Band	22q13.1	Start	38,734,725 bp
Band	22q13.1	End	38,794,143 bp

Gene location (Mouse)
Chr.	Chromosome 15 (mouse)
Band	15|15 E1	Start	79,608,271 bp
Band	15|15 E1	End	79,626,737 bp
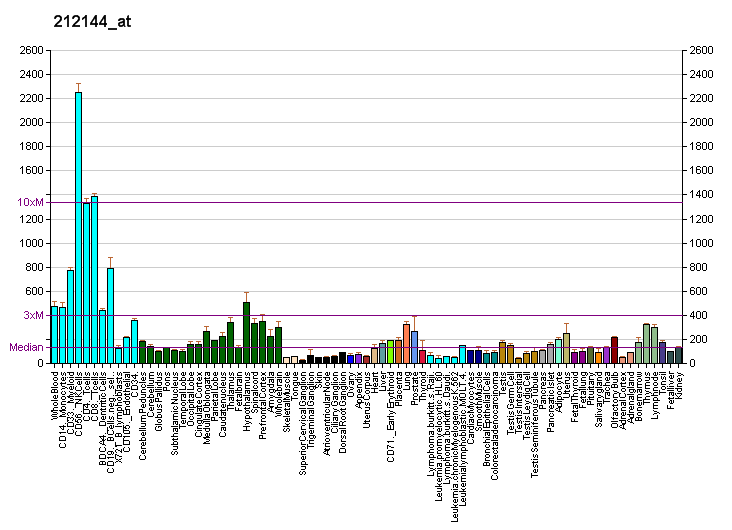
RNA expression pattern
Bgee	Human / Mouse (ortholog); Top expressed in: granulocyte; gastric mucosa; right coronary artery; thoracic aorta; Descending thoracic aorta; popliteal artery; tibial arteries; ascending aorta; right lung; left coronary artery / Top expressed in: granulocyte; ascending aorta; aortic valve; tibiofemoral joint; tunica media of zone of aorta; ankle joint; lip; hair follicle; muscle of thigh; calvaria; More reference expression data
BioGPS	More reference expression data
Gene ontology
Molecular function	microtubule binding; protein binding; identical protein binding; lamin binding; protein-membrane adaptor activity
Cellular component	integral component of membrane; endosome; nuclear membrane; nuclear envelope; membrane; integral component of nuclear inner membrane; condensed nuclear chromosome; nuclear inner membrane; meiotic nuclear membrane microtubule tethering complex; endosome membrane; nucleus
Biological process	nuclear matrix anchoring at nuclear membrane; nuclear envelope organization; nuclear migration along microfilament; centrosome localization; positive regulation of cell migration; mitotic spindle organization; nuclear migration; nucleokinesis involved in cell motility in cerebral cortex radial glia guided migration; meiosis
Sources:Amigo / QuickGO
Orthologs
Databases	NCBI: entry; OMA: entry
Species	Human	Mouse
Entrez	25777	223697
Ensembl	ENSG00000100242	ENSMUSG00000042524
UniProt	Q9UH99	Q8BJS4
RefSeq (mRNA)	NM_001199579; NM_001199580; NM_015374	NM_001205345; NM_001205346; NM_194342
RefSeq (protein)	NP_001186508; NP_001186509; NP_056189	NP_001192274; NP_001192275; NP_919323
Location (UCSC)	Chr 22: 38.73 – 38.79 Mb	Chr 15: 79.61 – 79.63 Mb
PubMed search
- Wikidata
View/Edit Human	View/Edit Mouse

SUN domain-containing protein 2 is a protein that in humans is encoded by the SUN2 gene (previously UNC84B).

== See also ==
- SUN domain-containing protein 1
