= Becker muscular dystrophy =

Genetic muscle disorder

- Other names: Benign pseudohypertrophic muscular dystrophy
- X-linked recessive is the manner in which this condition is inherited
- Specialty: Neurology
- Symptoms: Severe upper extremity muscle weakness, Toe-walking
- Causes: Mutations in DMD gene
- Diagnostic method: Neurological exam, muscle exam
- Treatment: No current cure, Physical therapy
- Frequency: 0.00261% (United Kingdom)

Becker muscular dystrophy (BMD) is an X-linked recessive inherited disorder characterized by slowly progressing muscle weakness of the legs and pelvis. It is a type of dystrophinopathy. The cause is mutations and deletions in any of the 79 exons encoding the large dystrophin protein, essential for maintaining the muscle fiber's cell membrane integrity. Becker muscular dystrophy is related to Duchenne muscular dystrophy in that both result from a mutation in the dystrophin gene, however, the hallmark of Becker is milder in-frame deletions. and hence has a milder course, with patients maintaining ambulation till 50–60 years if detected early.

While there is no known cure, management strategies such as physical therapy, braces, and corrective surgery may alleviate symptoms. Assisted ventilation may be required in those with weakness of breathing muscles. Several drugs designed to address the root cause are currently available including gene therapy (Elevidys).

Other medications used include glucocorticoids (Deflazacort, Vamorolone); calcium channel blockers (Diltiazem); to slow skeletal and cardiac muscle degeneration, anticonvulsants to control seizures and some muscle activity, and Histone deacetylase inhibitors (Givinostat) to delay damage to dying muscle cells. These patients do not require antisense drugs (Ataluren, Eteplirsen, etc.) as a certain percentage of dystrophin is already expressed.

== Signs and symptoms ==
Some symptoms consistent with Becker muscular dystrophy are:

- Muscle weakness, gradually increasing difficulty with walking
- Severe upper extremity muscle weakness
- Toe-walking
- Use of Gower's Maneuver to get up from floor
- Difficulty breathing
- Skeletal deformities of the chest, and back (scoliosis)
- Pseudohypertrophy of calf muscles
- Muscle cramps
- Heart muscle problems
- Elevated creatine kinase levels in blood

Individuals with this disorder typically experience progressive muscle weakness of the leg and pelvis muscles, which is associated with a loss of muscle mass (wasting). Muscle weakness also occurs in the arms, neck, and other areas, but is not as noticeably severe as in the lower half of the body. Calf muscles initially enlarge during the ages of 5–15 (an attempt by the body to compensate for the loss of muscle strength), but the enlarged muscle tissue is eventually replaced by fat and connective tissue (pseudohypertrophy) as the legs become less used (with use of a wheelchair).

=== Complications ===
Possible complications associated with muscular dystrophies (MD) are cardiac arrhythmias. Becker muscular dystrophy (BMD) also demonstrates the following:

- Mental impairment (less common in BMD than in DMD)
- Pulmonary failure
- Pneumonia

== Genetics ==
The gene affected is the DMD gene, is located on the X chromosome and is inherited in an X-linked recessive pattern. Since women have two X chromosomes, if one X chromosome has the non-working gene, the second X chromosome will have a working copy of the gene to compensate, because of this ability to compensate, women rarely develop symptoms. All dystrophinopathies are inherited in an X-linked recessive manner. The risk to the siblings of an affected individual depends upon the carrier status of the mother. Carrier females have a 50% chance of passing the DMD mutation in each pregnancy. Sons who inherit the mutation will be affected; daughters who inherit the mutation will be carriers. Men who have Becker muscular dystrophy can have children, and all their daughters are carriers, but none of the sons will inherit their father's mutation.

The DMD gene can be broken down into four different regions: the N terminal, rod, cysteine-rich, and carboxy terminal. This is the largest gene/protein in the human body, and due to its size, can have many different mutations affecting it and therefore differing clinical presentations. For example some patients with Becker's can be asymptomatic aside from blood work abnormalities, and some can present with progressive muscle weakness, heart defects, and difficulty with activities of daily living. Some literature even describes unique cases where muscle pain, cramping, and elevated creatine kinase levels are the only presenting symptoms instead of the classic presentation of muscle weakness.Becker muscular dystrophy occurs in approximately 1.5 to 6 in 100,000 male births, making it much less common than Duchenne muscular dystrophy. Symptoms usually appear in men at about ages 8–25, but may sometimes begin later. Genetic counseling may be advisable when potential carriers or patients want to have children. Sons of a man with Becker muscular dystrophy do not develop the disorder, but daughters will be carriers (and some carriers can experience some symptoms of muscular dystrophy), so the daughters' sons may develop the disorder.

== Diagnosis ==
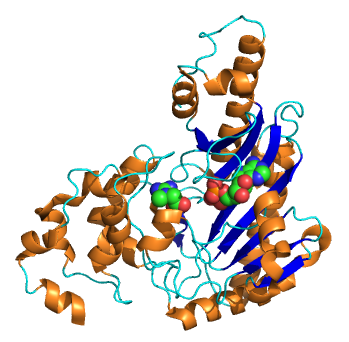
Creatine kinase

In terms of the diagnosis of Becker muscular dystrophy symptom development resembles that of Duchenne muscular dystrophy. A physical exam indicates a lack of pectoral and upper arm muscles, especially when the disease is unnoticed through the early teen years. Muscle wasting begins in the legs and pelvis, and then progresses to the muscles of the shoulders and neck. Calf muscle enlargement (pseudohypertrophy) is quite obvious. Among the exams/tests performed are:

- Muscle biopsy (removes a small piece of muscle tissue, usually from the thigh, to check for dystrophin in muscle cells.)
- Creatine kinase test (checks the level of Creatine Kinase proteins in the blood. Creatine Kinase proteins are normally found inside of healthy muscle cells, but can be found in the blood when muscle cells are damaged.)
- Electromyography (shows that weakness is caused by the destruction of muscle tissue rather than by damage to nerves.)
- Genetic testing (looks for deletion, duplication, or mutation of the dystrophin gene.)

== Treatment ==
There is no known cure for Becker muscular dystrophy yet. Treatment is aimed at control of symptoms to maximize the quality of life which can be measured by specific questionnaires. Activity is encouraged and can be considered vital for long-term survivability for these patients. Inactivity (such as bed rest) or sitting down for too long can worsen the muscle disease. Physical therapy may be helpful to maintain muscle strength. Orthopedic appliances such as braces and wheelchairs may improve mobility and self-care.

Immunosuppressant steroids have been known to help slow the progression of Becker muscular dystrophy. The drug prednisone contributes to increased production of the protein utrophin which closely resembles dystrophin, the protein that is defective in BMD.

The cardiac problems that occur with EDMD and myotonic muscular dystrophy may require a pacemaker. Other cardiomyopathies seen in Becker muscular dystrophy can also be treated with ACE inhibitors, cardiac transplant, and other personalized treatments.

The investigational drug Debio-025 is a known inhibitor of the protein cyclophilin D, which regulates the swelling of mitochondria in response to cellular injury. Researchers decided to test the drug in mice engineered to carry MD after earlier laboratory tests showed deleting a gene that encodes cyclophilin D reduced swelling and reversed or prevented the disease's muscle-damaging characteristics. According to a review by Bushby, et al. if a primary protein is not functioning properly then maybe another protein could take its place by augmenting it. Upregulation of compensatory proteins has been done in models of transgenic mice.

== Prognosis ==
The progression of Becker muscular dystrophy is highly variable—much more so than Duchenne muscular dystrophy. There is also a form that may be considered as an intermediate between Duchenne and Becker MD (mild DMD or severe BMD). The severity of the disease may be indicated by the age of the patient at the onset of the disease. One study showed that there may be two distinct patterns of progression in Becker muscular dystrophy. Onset at around age 7 to 8 years of age shows more cardiac involvement and trouble climbing stairs by age 20, if onset is around age 12, there is less cardiac involvement.The quality of life for patients with Becker muscular dystrophy can be impacted by the symptoms of the disorder. However, with assistive devices, independence can be maintained. People affected by Becker muscular dystrophy can still maintain active lifestyles.

== Research ==
There is no cure for any type of muscular dystrophy group. Several drugs designed to address the root cause are under development, including gene therapy (Microdystrophin), and antisense drugs (Ataluren, Eteplirsen etc.). Other medications used include corticosteroids (Deflazacort), calcium channel blockers (Diltiazem) to slow skeletal and cardiac muscle degeneration, anticonvulsants to control seizures and some muscle activity, and immunosuppressants (Vamorolone) to delay damage to dying muscle cells. Physical therapy, braces, and corrective surgery may help with some symptoms while assisted ventilation may be required in those with weakness of breathing muscles. Outcomes depend on the specific type of disorder.

== History ==
Becker muscular dystrophy is named after the German doctor Peter Emil Becker who published an article about it in 1955.
