= FHL1 =

Mammalian protein found in humans

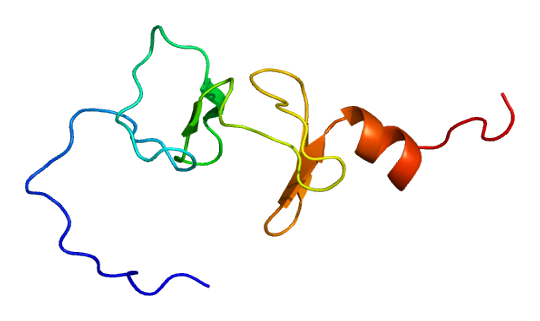

Identifiers
- Aliases: FHL1, FHL-1, FHL1A, FHL1B, FLH1A, KYOT, SLIM, SLIM-1, SLIM1, SLIMMER, XMPMA, RBMX1A, RBMX1B, four and a half LIM domains 1, FCMSU
- External IDs: OMIM: 300163; MGI: 1298387; GeneCards: FHL1
Available structures
PDB	Ortholog search: PDBe RCSB
PDB	List of PDB id codes 1X63, 2CUP, 2CUR

Gene location (Human)
Chr.	X chromosome (human)
Band	Xq26.3	Start	136,146,702 bp
Band	Xq26.3	End	136,211,359 bp

Gene location (Mouse)
Chr.	X chromosome (mouse)
Band	X|X A6	Start	55,777,147 bp
Band	X|X A6	End	55,838,706 bp
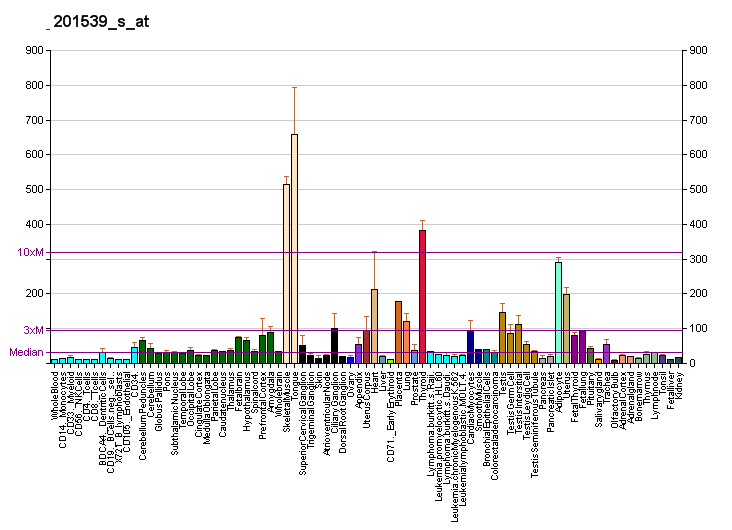

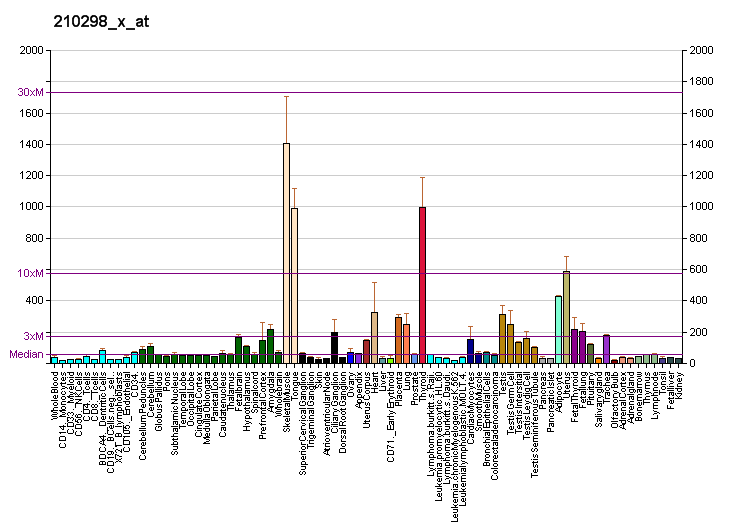

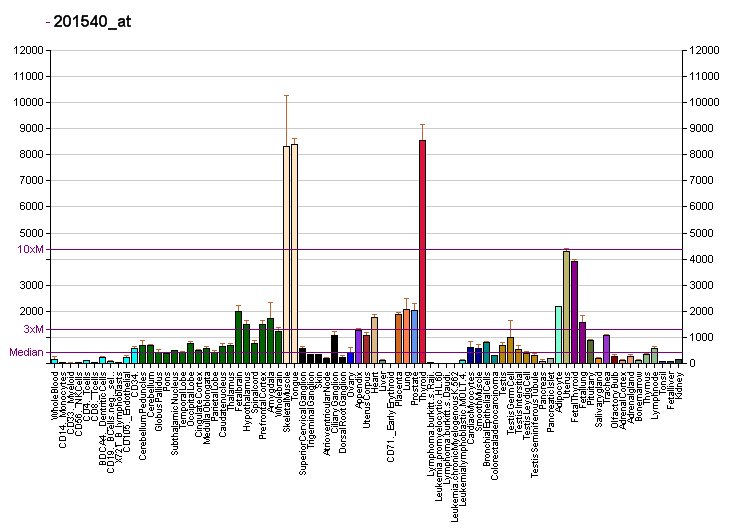
RNA expression pattern
Bgee	Human / Mouse (ortholog); Top expressed in: Skeletal muscle tissue of rectus abdominis; biceps brachii; Skeletal muscle tissue of biceps brachii; body of tongue; vastus lateralis muscle; deltoid muscle; thoracic diaphragm; tibialis anterior muscle; urethra; triceps brachii muscle / Top expressed in: plantaris muscle; ankle; soleus muscle; tunica media of zone of aorta; temporal muscle; sternocleidomastoid muscle; left lung lobe; digastric muscle; tibialis anterior muscle; intercostal muscle; More reference expression data
BioGPS	More reference expression data
Gene ontology
Molecular function	protein binding; transmembrane transporter binding; metal ion binding; molecular function
Cellular component	cytoplasm; plasma membrane; nucleus; focal adhesion; cytosol
Biological process	animal organ morphogenesis; negative regulation of G1/S transition of mitotic cell cycle; multicellular organism development; cell differentiation; muscle organ development; negative regulation of cell growth; regulation of potassium ion transmembrane transporter activity; regulation of membrane depolarization; negative regulation of G2/M transition of mitotic cell cycle; positive regulation of potassium ion transport
Sources:Amigo / QuickGO
Orthologs
Databases	NCBI: entry; OMA: entry
Species	Human	Mouse
Entrez	2273	14199
Ensembl	ENSG00000022267	ENSMUSG00000023092
UniProt	Q13642; Q5JXH9	P97447
RefSeq (mRNA)	NM_001159699; NM_001159700; NM_001159701; NM_001159702; NM_001159703 NM_001159704; NM_001167819; NM_001449; NM_001330659; NM_001369326; NM_001369327; NM_001369328; NM_001369329; NM_001369330; NM_001369331	NM_001077361; NM_001077362; NM_001287800; NM_010211
RefSeq (protein)	NP_001153171; NP_001153172; NP_001153173; NP_001153174; NP_001153175 NP_001153176; NP_001161291; NP_001317588; NP_001440; NP_001356255; NP_001356256; NP_001356257; NP_001356258; NP_001356259; NP_001356260	NP_001070829; NP_001070830; NP_001274729; NP_034341
Location (UCSC)	Chr X: 136.15 – 136.21 Mb	Chr X: 55.78 – 55.84 Mb
PubMed search
- Wikidata
View/Edit Human	View/Edit Mouse

Four and a half LIM domains protein 1 is a protein that in humans is encoded by the FHL1 gene.

== Structure ==
LIM proteins, named for 'LIN11, ISL1, and MEC3,' are defined by the possession of a highly conserved double zinc finger motif called the LIM domain.

== Role in muscle disorders ==
FHL1 has been shown to be heavily expressed in skeletal and cardiac muscles. In 2008 this was borne out by the discovery that defects in the FHL1 gene are responsible for a number of Muscular dystrophy-like muscle disorders, ranging from severe, childhood onset diseases through to adult-onset disorders similar to Limb girdle muscular dystrophy. At least 15 disease-causing mutations in this gene have been discovered. At present different research groups are using different terminology for these disorders, which include:

X-linked myopathy with postural muscle atrophy (XMPMA)
An adult-onset muscle disorder known to affect families in Austria and the UK.

Reducing body myopathy (RBM)
A rare disorder causing progressive muscular weakness characterized by aggresome-like inclusions in the myofibrils. The effects of the disorder can be either severe, with onset of weakness at approximately five years, or adult onset, with weakness occurring in the late 20s, early 30s.

Scapuloperoneal myopathy (SPM)
Another adult-onset muscle disorder, especially affecting the shoulder girdle and legs.
