= SUN domain-containing protein 5 =

Protein-coding gene in the species Homo sapiens

SUN5

Identifiers
- Aliases: SUN5, SPAG4L, TSARG4, dJ726C3.1, Sad1 and UNC84 domain containing 5, SPGF16
- External IDs: OMIM: 613942; MGI: 1923657; GeneCards: SUN5

Gene location (Human)
Chr.	Chromosome 20 (human)
Band	20q11.21	Start	32,983,773 bp
Band	20q11.21	End	33,004,433 bp

Gene location (Mouse)
Chr.	Chromosome 2 (mouse)
Band	2|2 H1	Start	153,698,108 bp
Band	2|2 H1	End	153,713,004 bp
RNA expression pattern
Bgee	Human / Mouse (ortholog); Top expressed in: right testis; left testis; testicle; secondary oocyte; sperm; endothelial cell; external globus pallidus; synovial joint; jejunal mucosa; skin of hip / Top expressed in: spermatid; seminiferous tubule; spermatocyte; lumbar subsegment of spinal cord; lumbar spinal ganglion; temporal muscle; ear; gastrula; islet of Langerhans; carotid body; More reference expression data
BioGPS	n/a
Gene ontology
Molecular function	protein-membrane adaptor activity; molecular function
Cellular component	integral component of membrane; membrane; nucleus; nuclear inner membrane; sperm connecting piece; Golgi apparatus; nuclear envelope; meiotic nuclear membrane microtubule tethering complex
Biological process	nuclear envelope organization; spermatogenesis; cell differentiation; spermatid development
Sources:Amigo / QuickGO
Orthologs
Databases	NCBI: entry; OMA: entry
Species	Human	Mouse
Entrez	140732	76407
Ensembl	ENSG00000167098	ENSMUSG00000027480
UniProt	Q8TC36	Q9DA32
RefSeq (mRNA)	NM_080675	NM_029599; NM_001305048
RefSeq (protein)	NP_542406	NP_001291977; NP_083875
Location (UCSC)	Chr 20: 32.98 – 33 Mb	Chr 2: 153.7 – 153.71 Mb
PubMed search
- Wikidata
View/Edit Human	View/Edit Mouse

SUN domain-containing protein 5, formerly known as sperm-associated antigen 4-like protein (SPAGL4), is a protein that in humans is encoded by the SUN5 gene.
