= Gowers's sign =

Weakness of the lower limb muscles

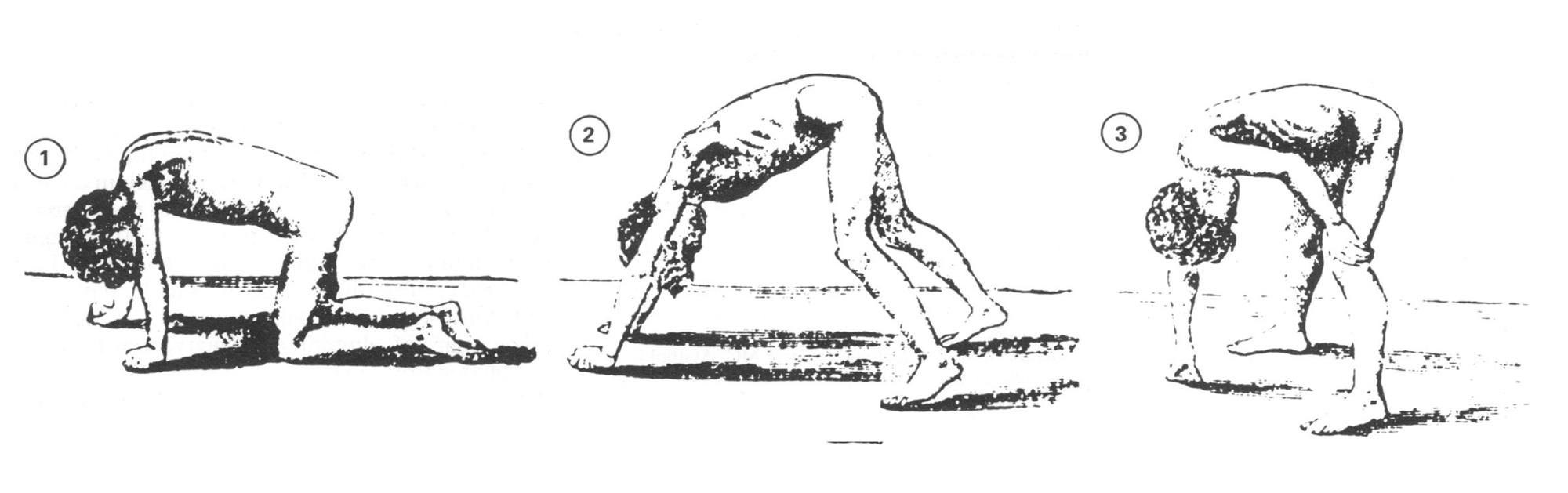
- Gowers's sign
- Differential diagnosis: Duchenne muscular dystrophy

Gowers's sign is a medical sign that indicates weakness of the proximal muscles, namely those of the lower limb. The sign describes a patient that has to use their hands and arms to "walk" up their own body from a squatting position due to lack of hip and thigh muscle strength.

It is named after William Richard Gowers.

== Associations ==
Gowers's sign is classically seen in Duchenne muscular dystrophy where it is mostly evident at 4–6 years, but also presents itself in centronuclear myopathy, myotonic dystrophy and various other conditions associated with proximal muscle weakness, including Becker muscular dystrophy, dermatomyositis and Pompe disease. For this maneuver, the patient is placed on the floor away from any objects that could otherwise be used to pull oneself to a standing position. It is also used in testing paraplegia.

== See also ==
- Spinal muscular atrophy
