= Collagen, type VI, alpha 2 =

Protein found in humans

COL6A2

Identifiers
- Aliases: COL6A2, PP3610, BTHLM1, UCMD1, collagen type VI alpha 2, collagen type VI alpha 2 chain
- External IDs: OMIM: 120240; MGI: 88460; GeneCards: COL6A2

Gene location (Human)
Chr.	Chromosome 21 (human)
Band	21q22.3	Start	46,098,112 bp
Band	21q22.3	End	46,132,848 bp

Gene location (Mouse)
Chr.	Chromosome 10 (mouse)
Band	10 C1|10 39.32 cM	Start	76,431,596 bp
Band	10 C1|10 39.32 cM	End	76,459,464 bp
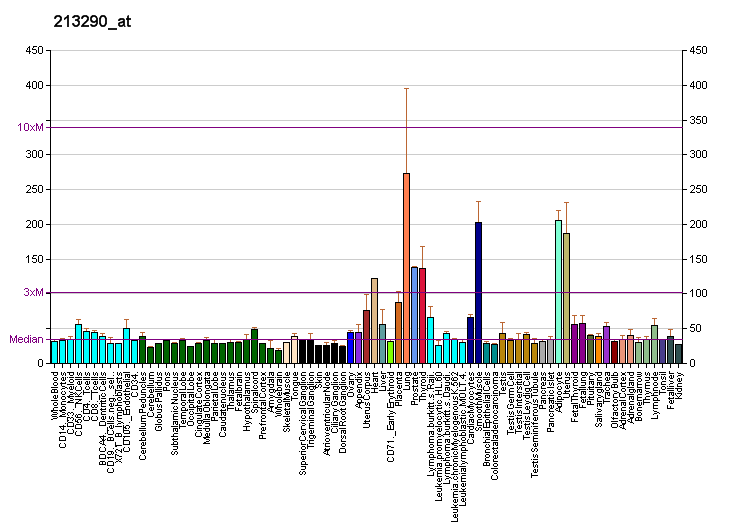

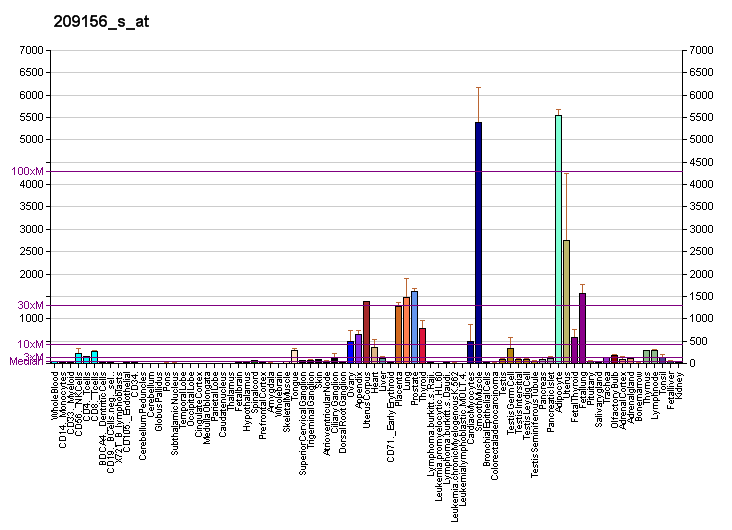
RNA expression pattern
Bgee	Human / Mouse (ortholog); Top expressed in: stromal cell of endometrium; right coronary artery; Descending thoracic aorta; ascending aorta; body of uterus; muscle layer of sigmoid colon; left uterine tube; gastric mucosa; saphenous vein; canal of the cervix / Top expressed in: calvaria; internal carotid artery; external carotid artery; efferent ductule; ankle; Gonadal ridge; vas deferens; uterus; cervix; umbilical cord; More reference expression data
BioGPS	More reference expression data
Gene ontology
Molecular function	protein binding; extracellular matrix structural constituent conferring tensile strength
Cellular component	extracellular vesicle; sarcolemma; collagen; endoplasmic reticulum lumen; extracellular exosome; membrane; extracellular matrix; extracellular region; extracellular space; protein-containing complex; collagen-containing extracellular matrix
Biological process	collagen catabolic process; protein heterotrimerization; cell adhesion; extracellular matrix organization; response to glucose; growth plate cartilage chondrocyte morphogenesis
Sources:Amigo / QuickGO
Orthologs
Databases	NCBI: entry; OMA: entry
Species	Human	Mouse
Entrez	1292	12834
Ensembl	ENSG00000142173	ENSMUSG00000020241
UniProt	P12110	Q02788
RefSeq (mRNA)	NM_001849; NM_058174; NM_058175	NM_146007; NM_001347207
RefSeq (protein)	NP_001840; NP_478054; NP_478055	NP_001334136; NP_666119
Location (UCSC)	Chr 21: 46.1 – 46.13 Mb	Chr 10: 76.43 – 76.46 Mb
PubMed search
- Wikidata
View/Edit Human	View/Edit Mouse

Collagen alpha-2(VI) chain is a protein that in humans is encoded by the COL6A2 gene.

== Function ==
This gene encodes one of the three alpha chains of type VI collagen, a beaded filament collagen found in most connective tissues. The product of this gene contains several domains similar to von Willebrand factor type A domains. These domains have been shown to bind extracellular matrix proteins, an interaction that explains the importance of this collagen in organizing matrix components. Pathogenic variants in this gene are associated with collagen VI-related dystrophies, a spectrum of disorders that includes Bethlem muscular dystrophy, intermediate collagen VI-related dystrophy, and Ullrich congenital muscular dystrophy. Certain biallelic COL6A2 variants have also been associated with a phenotype referred to as myosclerosis. Three transcript variants have been identified for this gene.
