= SUN domain-containing protein 1 =

Protein-coding gene in the species Homo sapiens

SUN1

Identifiers
- Aliases: SUN1, UNC84A, Sad1 and UNC84 domain containing 1
- External IDs: OMIM: 607723; MGI: 1924303; GeneCards: SUN1

Gene location (Human)
Chr.	Chromosome 7 (human)
Band	7p22.3	Start	816,615 bp
Band	7p22.3	End	896,435 bp

Gene location (Mouse)
Chr.	Chromosome 5 (mouse)
Band	5|5 G2	Start	139,186,392 bp
Band	5|5 G2	End	139,235,595 bp
RNA expression pattern
Bgee	Human / Mouse (ortholog); Top expressed in: secondary oocyte; gastric mucosa; mucosa of paranasal sinus; right uterine tube; body of uterus; left ovary; bronchial epithelial cell; right hemisphere of cerebellum; canal of the cervix; right ovary / Top expressed in: spermatocyte; spermatid; saccule; transitional epithelium of urinary bladder; olfactory epithelium; superior frontal gyrus; ectoderm; otic vesicle; otic placode; neural layer of retina; More reference expression data
BioGPS	n/a
Gene ontology
Molecular function	protein binding; lamin binding; protein-membrane adaptor activity
Cellular component	cytoplasm; integral component of membrane; nuclear inner membrane; integral component of nuclear inner membrane; nuclear membrane; acrosomal membrane; intracellular membrane-bounded organelle; nucleus; membrane; meiotic nuclear membrane microtubule tethering complex; nuclear envelope
Biological process	response to mechanical stimulus; homologous chromosome pairing at meiosis; nuclear envelope organization; nuclear matrix anchoring at nuclear membrane; ossification; spermatogenesis; nucleokinesis involved in cell motility in cerebral cortex radial glia guided migration; cell differentiation; meiosis; centrosome localization; meiotic attachment of telomere to nuclear envelope
Sources:Amigo / QuickGO
Orthologs
Databases	NCBI: entry; OMA: entry
Species	Human	Mouse
Entrez	23353	77053
Ensembl	ENSG00000164828	ENSMUSG00000036817
UniProt	O94901	Q9D666
RefSeq (mRNA)	NM_025154; NM_001130965; NM_001171944; NM_001171945; NM_001171946	NM_001256115; NM_001256116; NM_001256117; NM_001256118; NM_024451 NM_001359494; NM_001359496
RefSeq (protein)	NP_001124437; NP_001165415; NP_001165416; NP_001165417; NP_079430 NP_001354562; NP_001354563; NP_001354564; NP_001354565; NP_001354566; NP_001354567; NP_001354568; NP_001354569; NP_001354570; NP_001354571; NP_001354572; NP_001354573; NP_001354574; NP_001354575; NP_001354576; NP_001354577; NP_001354578; NP_001354580; NP_001354582; NP_001354584; NP_001354587; NP_001354589; NP_001354591; NP_001354593; NP_001354594; NP_001354595; NP_001354596; NP_001354597; NP_001354598; NP_001354599; NP_001354600; NP_001354601; NP_001354602; NP_001354603; NP_001354604; NP_001354605; NP_001354606; NP_001354607; NP_001354608; NP_001354609; NP_001354610; NP_001354611; NP_001354612; NP_001354613; NP_001354614; NP_001354615; NP_001354616; NP_001354617; NP_001354618; NP_001354619; NP_001354620; NP_001354621; NP_001354622; NP_001354623; NP_001354624; NP_001354625; NP_001354626; NP_001354627; NP_001354628; NP_001354629; NP_001354630; NP_001354631; NP_001354632; NP_001354633; NP_001354634; NP_001354635; NP_001354637	NP_001243044; NP_001243045; NP_001243046; NP_001243047; NP_077771 NP_001346423; NP_001346425
Location (UCSC)	Chr 7: 0.82 – 0.9 Mb	Chr 5: 139.19 – 139.24 Mb
PubMed search
- Wikidata
View/Edit Human	View/Edit Mouse

SUN domain-containing protein 1 is a protein that in humans is encoded by the SUN1 gene (previously UNC84A).

This gene is a member of the unc-84 homolog family and encodes a nuclear envelope protein with an Unc84 (SUN) domain. The protein is involved in nuclear anchorage and migration. Several alternatively spliced transcript variants of this gene have been described; however, the full-length nature of some of these variants has not been determined.
