= Ullrich congenital muscular dystrophy =

- Other names: Scleroatonic muscular dystrophy
- Autosomal recessive pattern is the inheritance manner of this condition
- Symptoms: Muscle weakness
- Types: UCMD1, UCMD2
- Causes: Mutations in the COL6A1, COL6A2, COL6A3, and COL12A1 gene
- Diagnostic method: Physical exam, Medical history
- Medication: Physical therapy, Surgery(scoliosis)

Ullrich congenital muscular dystrophy (UCMD) is a form of congenital muscular dystrophy. There are two forms: UCMD1 and UCMD2.

UCMD1 is associated with variants of type VI collagen, while UCMD2 is associated with variants of type XII collagen.

UCMD is commonly associated with contractures, joint laxity, muscle weakness, and respiratory problems, though cardiac issues are not associated with this type of CMD. It is named after Otto Ullrich, who is also known for the Ullrich-Turner syndrome.

== Signs and symptoms ==
The presentation of Ullrich congenital muscular dystrophy in an affected individual is as follows:

- Muscle weakness
- Difficulty walking (ambulation is typically lost by age 5–15 years)
- Contractures Characteristically, bilateral contractures of the proximal joints of the upper extremities (shoulder and elbows) and proximal joints of the lower extremities (hips and knees). Spine contractures in the form of progressive scoliosis occurs and occasionally contracture of neck musculature also known as torticollis.
- Joint looseness Contractures can be associated with distal joint laxity of the upper extremities (wrists and fingers) and of the lower extremities (ankle and toes).
- Fatty infiltration of muscle

== Genetics ==
In terms of the genetics of UCMD1, there are mutations in the genes COL6A1, COL6A2, and COL6A3. This sub-type of muscular dystrophy is both autosomal recessive and autosomal dominant in nature.

COL6A1 plays an important part in maintaining the human body's integrity of various tissues. Alpha 1 subunit of type VI collagen is the encoded protein.

In terms of the genetics of UCMD2, there are mutations in the gene COL12A1, and is autosomal recessive.

Collagen VI is a principal structural component of the extracellular matrix (ECM), where it self-assembles into a distinct microfibrillar network that links the muscle fiber's basal lamina to the surrounding interstitial matrix, thereby anchoring muscle cells to the ECM. Mutations in COL6A1, COL6A2, and COL6A3 impair the proper assembly, secretion, or incorporation of collagen VI microfibrils into the ECM, disrupting its structural integrity and contributing to the muscle-fiber degeneration observed in UCMD.

== Diagnosis ==
In terms of the diagnosis of Ullrich congenital muscular dystrophy upon inspection follicular hyperkeratosis, may be a dermatological indicator, additionally also serum creatine kinase may be mildly above normal. Other exams/methods to ascertain if the individual has Ullrich congenital muscular dystrophy are:

- MRI
- Biopsy muscle
- Genetic testing

=== Differential diagnosis ===
This includes

- Autosomal recessive myosclerosis
- Bethlem myopathy
- Ehlers–Danlos syndrome
- Emery–Dreifuss muscular dystrophy
- Limb-girdle muscular dystrophy
- RYR1-associated multiminicore disease

Phenotypes of overlap between Ullrich congenital muscular dystrophy (UCMD) and Bethlem myopathy can be assumed. In the differential diagnosis of UCDM, even in patients without finger contractures, Bethlem myopathy could be considered.

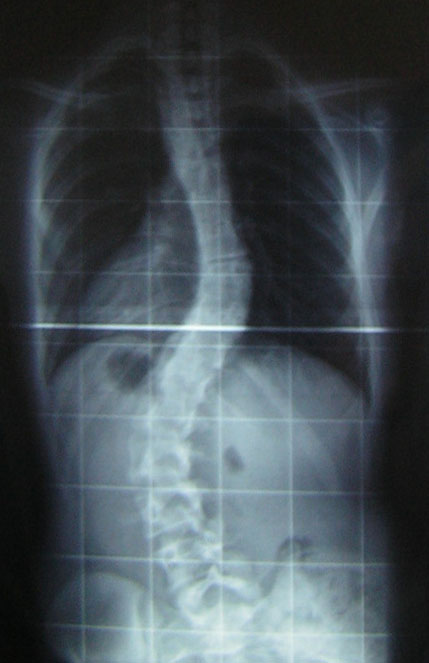
Scoliosis X-ray

== Treatment ==
Treatment for Ullrich congenital muscular dystrophy can consist of physical therapy and regular stretching to prevent and reduce contractures. Respiratory support may be needed at some point by the affected individual.

Non-invasive ventilation (NIV), typically in the form of bilevel positive airway pressure (BiPAP), is the most commonly used form of respiratory support, with ventilation via a tracheostomy used in some cases. While primary cardiomyopathy is not a typical feature of this type of CMD, chronic respiratory insufficiency can lead to secondary right heart strain, which NIV also helps to prevent.

== Prognosis ==
The prognosis of this sub-type of MD indicates that the affected individual may eventually have feeding difficulties. Surgery, at some point, might be an option for scoliosis.

Scoliosis, which is a sideways curve of the persons vertebrate, is determined by a variety of factors, including the degree (mild or severe), in which case if possible a brace might be used by the individual.

== Research ==
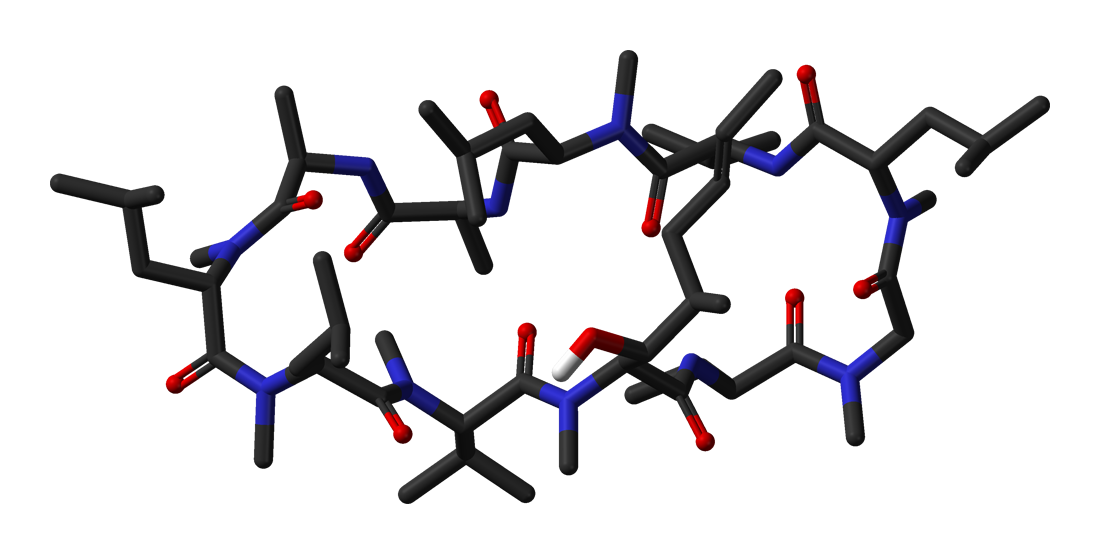
Cyclosporin-A

In terms of possible research for Ullrich congenital muscular dystrophy one source indicates that cyclosporine A might be of benefit to individuals with this CMD type.

According to a review by Bernardi, et al., cyclosporin A (CsA) used to treat collagen VI muscular dystrophies demonstrates a normalization of mitochondrial reaction to rotenone.

== See also ==
- Muscular dystrophy
- Congenital muscular dystrophy
- Bethlem myopathy
