= Collagen, type VI, alpha 3 =

Mammalian protein found in humans

COL6A3
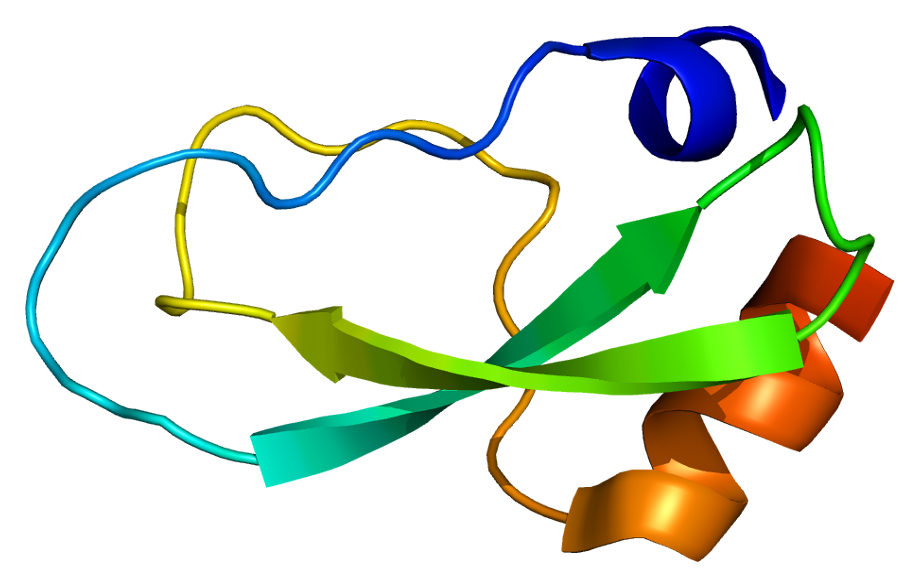

Identifiers
- Aliases: COL6A3, DYT27, BTHLM1, UCMD1, collagen type VI alpha 3, collagen type VI alpha 3 chain
- External IDs: OMIM: 120250; MGI: 88461; GeneCards: COL6A3
Available structures
PDB	Human UniProt search: PDBe RCSB
PDB	List of PDB id codes 1KNT, 1KTH, 1KUN, 2KNT

Gene location (Human)
Chr.	Chromosome 2 (human)
Band	2q37.3	Start	237,324,003 bp
Band	2q37.3	End	237,414,328 bp

Gene location (Mouse)
Chr.	Chromosome 1 (mouse)
Band	1 D|1 45.53 cM	Start	90,765,923 bp
Band	1 D|1 45.53 cM	End	90,843,971 bp
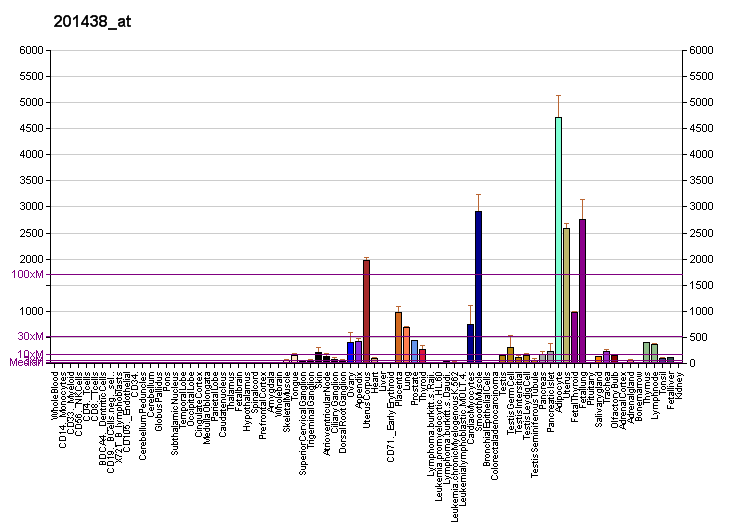
RNA expression pattern
Bgee	Human / Mouse (ortholog); Top expressed in: stromal cell of endometrium; visceral pleura; periodontal fiber; skin of hip; synovial membrane; decidua; synovial joint; parietal pleura; saphenous vein; pericardium / Top expressed in: umbilical cord; dermis; efferent ductule; calvaria; cervix; body of femur; left lung lobe; human fetus; vas deferens; epithelium of lens; More reference expression data
BioGPS	More reference expression data
Gene ontology
Molecular function	peptidase inhibitor activity; serine-type endopeptidase inhibitor activity; extracellular matrix structural constituent conferring tensile strength
Cellular component	extracellular matrix; extracellular vesicle; collagen type VI trimer; sarcolemma; collagen; endoplasmic reticulum lumen; extracellular exosome; extracellular space; extracellular region; collagen-containing extracellular matrix
Biological process	collagen catabolic process; muscle organ development; negative regulation of peptidase activity; cell adhesion; extracellular matrix organization; negative regulation of endopeptidase activity; growth plate cartilage chondrocyte morphogenesis
Sources:Amigo / QuickGO
Orthologs
Databases	NCBI: entry; OMA: entry
Species	Human	Mouse
Entrez	1293	12835
Ensembl	ENSG00000163359	ENSMUSG00000048126
UniProt	P12111	n/a
RefSeq (mRNA)	NM_004369; NM_057164; NM_057165; NM_057166; NM_057167	NM_001243008; NM_001243009; NM_009935
RefSeq (protein)	NP_004360; NP_476505; NP_476506; NP_476507; NP_476508	n/a
Location (UCSC)	Chr 2: 237.32 – 237.41 Mb	Chr 1: 90.77 – 90.84 Mb
PubMed search
- Wikidata
View/Edit Human	View/Edit Mouse

Collagen alpha-3(VI) chain is a protein that in humans is encoded by the COL6A3 gene. This protein is an alpha chain of type VI collagen that aids in microfibril formation. As part of type VI collagen, this protein has been implicated in Bethlem myopathy, Ullrich congenital muscular dystrophy (UCMD), and other diseases related to muscle and connective tissue.

== Structure ==
This gene encodes the alpha 3 chain, one of the three alpha chains of type VI collagen, a beaded filament collagen found in most connective tissues. The alpha 3 chain of type VI collagen is much larger than the alpha 1 and 2 chains. This difference in size is largely due to an increase in the number of subdomains, similar to von Willebrand Factor type A domains, found in the amino terminal globular domain of all the alpha chains. In addition to the full length transcript, four transcript variants have been identified that encode proteins with N-terminal globular domains of varying sizes.

== Function ==
The alpha 3 type VI chain has been shown to bind extracellular matrix proteins, an interaction that explains the importance of this collagen in organizing matrix components. Microfibril formation has been traced to interactions between its N-terminal subdomain N5 and its C-terminal C5 domain in adjacent type VI collagen monomers.

== Clinical significance ==
Mutations in the type VI collagen genes are associated with Bethlem myopathy and Ullrich congenital muscular dystrophy (UCMD). Typically, both Bethlem myopathy and autosomal recessive UCMD patients are heterozygous for mutations in the three type VI collagen alpha chains, but only the former exhibit symptoms. Of the three alpha chains, COL6A3 mutations contribute to only 18% of the Bethlem myopathy and UCMD cases. A study on UCMD mutations by Zhang et al found only one non-pathogenic mutation in COL6A3. Nonetheless, knockdown of mutant COL6A3 in patient fibroblast cells using siRNA has successfully improved cellular deposition of type VI collagen in autosomal dominant UCMD, and may become a promising treatment for it. Though high expression levels of COL6A3 have been correlated with obesity and diabetes in mice, this relationship was not observed in humans. Other disorders involving muscle and connective tissue include weakness, joint laxity and contractures, and abnormal skin.
