= Congenital disorder of glycosylation =

Congenital disorders of glycosylation
- Specialty: Neurology

A congenital disorder of glycosylation (previously called carbohydrate-deficient glycoprotein syndrome) is one of several rare inborn errors of metabolism in which glycosylation of a variety of tissue proteins and/or lipids is deficient or defective. Congenital disorders of glycosylation are sometimes known as CDG syndromes. They often cause serious, sometimes fatal, malfunction of several different organ systems (especially the nervous system, muscles, and intestines) in affected infants. The most common sub-type is PMM2-CDG (formerly known as CDG-Ia) where the genetic defect leads to the loss of phosphomannomutase 2 (PMM2), the enzyme responsible for the conversion of mannose-6-phosphate into mannose-1-phosphate.

== Presentation ==
Clinical features depend on the molecular pathology of the particular CDG subtype. Common manifestations include ataxia; seizures; retinopathy; liver disease; coagulopathies; failure to thrive (FTT); dysmorphic features (e.g., inverted nipples and subcutaneous fat pads); pericardial effusion, skeletal abnormalities, and hypotonia. If an MRI is obtained, cerebellar hypoplasia is a common finding. Some CDG subtypes, like SSR4-CDG 1y, have been classified as connective tissue disorders.

Ocular abnormalities of PMM2-CDG include: myopia, infantile esotropia, delayed visual maturation, peripheral neuropathy (PN), strabismus, nystagmus, optic disc pallor, and reduced rod function on electroretinography. Three CDG subtypes PMM2-CDG, PMI-CDG, ALG6-CDG can cause congenital hyperinsulinism with hyperinsulinemic hypoglycemia in infancy. Because glycoproteins are involved in many central nervous system processes important during early development, intellectual disability and developmental delays are also common in CDG

== N-Glycosylation and known defects ==
A biologically very important group of carbohydrates is the asparagine (Asn)-linked, or N-linked, oligosaccharides. Their biosynthetic pathway is very complex and involves a hundred or more glycosyltransferases, glycosidases, transporters and synthases. This plethora allows for the formation of a multitude of different final oligosaccharide structures, involved in protein folding, intracellular transport/localization, protein activity, and degradation/half-life. A vast amount of carbohydrate binding molecules (lectins) depend on correct glycosylation for appropriate binding; the selectins, involved in leukocyte extravasation, is a prime example. Their binding depends on a correct fucosylation of cell surface glycoproteins. Lack thereof leads to leukocytosis and increased sensitivity to infections as seen in SLC35C1-CDG(CDG-IIc); caused by a GDP-fucose (Fuc) transporter deficiency. All N-linked oligosaccharides originate from a common lipid-linked oligosaccharide (LLO) precursor, synthesized in the ER on a dolichol-phosphate (Dol-P) anchor. The mature LLO is transferred co-translationally to consensus sequence Asn residues in the nascent protein, and is further modified by trimming and re-building in the Golgi.

Deficiencies in the genes involved in N-linked glycosylation constitute the molecular background of most CDGs.

- Type I defects involve the synthesis and transfer of the LLO
- Type II defects impair the modification process of protein-bound oligosaccharides.

=== Type I ===
Description	Disorder	Product
The formation of the LLO is initiated by the synthesis of the polyisoprenyl dolichol from farnesyl, a precursor of cholesterol biosynthesis. This step involves at least three genes, DHDDS (encoding dehydrodolichyl diphosphate synthase that is a cis-prenyl transferase), DOLPP1 (a pyrophosphatase) and SRD5A3, encoding a reductase that completes the formation of dolichol.	Recently, exome sequencing showed that mutations in DHDDS cause a disorder with a retinal phenotype (retinitis pigmentosa, a common finding in CDG patients. Further, the intermediary reductase in this process (encoded by SRD5A3), is deficient in SRD5A3-CDG (CDG-Iq).	
Dol is then activated to Dol-P via the action of Dol kinase in the ER membrane.	This process is defective in DOLK-CDG (CDG-Im).	
Consecutive N-acetylglucosamine (GlcNAc)- and mannosyltransferases use the nucleotide sugar donors UDP-GlcNAc and GDP-mannose (Man) to form a pyrophosphate-linked seven sugar glycan structure (Man5GlcNAc2-PP-Dol) on the cytoplasmatic side of the ER.	Some of these steps have been found deficient in patients.: Deficiency in GlcNAc-1-P transferase causes DPAGT1-CDG (CDG-Ij); Loss of the first mannosyltransferase causes ALG1-CDG (CDG-Ik); Loss of the second mannosyltransferase (adds Man II and III) causes ALG2-CDG (CDG-Ii).; Loss of the third mannosyltransferase (adds Man IV and V) causes ALG11-CDG (CDG-Ip); Mutations in the other genes involved in these steps (ALG13 and ALG14) are yet to be described.	Man5GlcNAc2-PP-Dol
The M5GlcNAc2-structure is then flipped to the ER lumen, via the action of a "flippase"	This is deficient in RFT1-CDG (CDG-In).	
Finally, three mannosyltransferases and three glucosyltransferases complete the LLO structure Glc3Man9GlcNAc2-PP-Dol using Dol-P-Man and Dol-P-glucose (Glc) as donors.	There are five known defects: mannosyltransferase VI deficiency causes ALG3-CDG (CDG-Id); mannosyltransferase VII/IX deficiency causes ALG9-CDG (CDG-IL); mannosyltransferase VIII deficiency causes ALG12-CDG (CDG-Ig); glucosyltransferase I deficiency causes ALG6-CDG (CDG-Ic); glucosyltransferase II deficiency causes ALG8-CDG (CDG-Ih).	Glc3Man9GlcNAc2-PP-Dol
A protein with hitherto unknown activity, MPDU-1, is required for the efficient presentation of Dol-P-Man and Dol-P-Glc.	Its deficiency causes MPDU1-CDG (CDG-If).	
The synthesis of GDP-Man is crucial for proper N-glycosylation, as it serves as donor substrate for the formation of Dol-P-Man and the initial Man5GlcNAc2-P-Dol structure. GDP-Man synthesis is linked to glycolysis via the interconversion of fructose-6-P and Man-6-P, catalyzed by phosphomannose isomerase (PMI).	This step is deficient in MPI-CDG (CDG-Ib), which is the only treatable CDG-I subtype.	
Man-1-P is then formed from Man-6-P, catalyzed by phosphomannomutase (PMM2), and Man-1-P serves as substrate in the GDP-Man synthesis.	Mutations in PMM2 cause PMM2-CDG (CDG-Ia), the most common CDG subtype.	
Dol-P-Man is formed via the action of Dol-P-Man synthase, consisting of three subunits; DPM1, DPM2, and DPM3.	Mutations in DPM1 causes DPM1-CDG (CDG-Ie). Mutations in DPM2 (DPM2-CDG) and DPM3 (DPM3-CDG (CDG-Io)) cause syndromes with a muscle phenotype resembling an a-dystroglycanopathy, possibly due to lack of Dol-P-Man required for O-mannosylation.	
The final Dol-PP-bound 14mer oligosaccharides (Glc3Man9GlcNAc2-PP-Dol) are transferred to consensus Asn residues in the acceptor proteins in the ER lumen, catalyzed by the oligosaccharyltransferase(OST). The OST is composed by several subunits, including DDOST, TUSC3, MAGT1, KRTCAP2 and STT3a and -3b.	Three of these genes have hitherto been shown to be mutated in CDG patients, DDOST (DDOST-CDG (CDG-Ir)), TUSC3 (TUSC3-CDG) and MAGT1 (MAGT1-CDG).	

=== Type II ===
The mature LLO chain is next transferred to the growing protein chain, a process catalysed by the oligosaccharyl transferase (OST) complex.

- Once transferred to the protein chain, the oligosaccharide is trimmed by specific glycosidases. This process is vital since the lectin chaperones calnexin and calreticulin, involved in protein quality, bind to the Glc1Man9GlcNAc-structure and assure proper folding. Lack of the first glycosidase (GCS1) causes CDG-IIb.
- Removal of the Glc residues and the first Man residue occurs in the ER.
- The glycoprotein then travels to the Golgi, where a multitude of different structures with different biological activities are formed.
- Mannosidase I creates a Man5GlcNAc2-structure on the protein, but note that this has a different structure than the one made on LLO.
- Next, a GlcNAc residue forms GlcNAc1Man5GlcNAc2, the substrate for a-mannosidase II (aManII).
- aManII then removes two Man residues, creating the substrate for GlcNAc transferase II, which adds a GlcNAc to the second Man branch. This structure serves as substrate for additional galactosylation, fucosylation and sialylation reactions. Additionally, substitution with more GlcNAc residues can yield tri- and tetra-antennary molecules.

Not all structures are fully modified, some remain as high-mannose structures, others as hybrids (one unmodified Man branch and one modified), but the majority become fully modified complex type oligosaccharides.

In addition to glycosidase I, mutations have been found:

- in MGAT2, in GlcNAc transferase II (CDG-IIa)
- in SLC35C1, the GDP-Fuc transporter (CDG-IIc)
- in B4GALT1, a galactosyltransferase (CDG-IId)
- in COG7, the conserved oligomeric Golgi complex-7 (CDG-IIe)
- in SLC35A1, the CMP-sialic acid (NeuAc) transporter (CDG-IIf)

However, since at least 1% of the genome is involved in glycosylation, it is likely that many more defects remain to be found.

== Diagnosis ==
=== Classification ===
Historically, CDGs are classified as Types I and II (CDG-I and CDG-II), depending on the nature and location of the biochemical defect in the metabolic pathway relative to the action of oligosaccharyltransferase. The most commonly used screening method for CDG, analysis of transferrin glycosylation status by isoelectric focusing, ESI-MS, or other techniques, distinguish between these subtypes in so called Type I and Type II patterns.

Currently, over 130 subtypes of CDG have been described.

Since 2009, most researchers use a different nomenclature based on the gene defect (e.g. CDG-Ia = PMM2-CDG, CDG-Ib = PMI-CDG, CDG-Ic = ALG6-CDG etc.). The reason for the new nomenclature was the fact that proteins not directly involved in glycan synthesis (such as members of the COG-family and vesicular H+-ATPase) were found to be causing the glycosylation defect in some CDG patients.

Also, defects disturbing other glycosylation pathways than the N-linked one are included in this classification. Examples are the α-dystroglycanopathies (e.g. POMT1/POMT2-CDG (Walker–Warburg syndrome and uscle–eye–brain syndrome)) with deficiencies in O-mannosylation of proteins; O-xylosylglycan synthesis defects (EXT1/EXT2-CDG (hereditary multiple exostoses) and B4GALT7-CDG (Ehlers–Danlos syndrome, progeroid variant)); O-fucosylglycan synthesis (B3GALTL-CDG (Peter's plus syndrome) and LFNG-CDG (spondylocostal dysostosis III)).

==== Type I ====
- Type I disorders involve disrupted synthesis of the lipid-linked oligosaccharide precursor (LLO) or its transfer to the protein.

Types include:

Type	OMIM	Gene	Locus
Ia (PMM2-CDG)	212065	PMM2	16p13.3-p13.2
Ib (MPI-CDG)	602579	MPI	15q22-qter
Ic (ALG6-CDG)	603147	ALG6	1p22.3
Id (ALG3-CDG)	601110	ALG3	3q27
Ie (DPM1-CDG)	608799	DPM1	20q13.13
If (MPDU1-CDG)	609180	MPDU1	17p13.1-p12
Ig (ALG12-CDG)	607143	ALG12	22q13.33
Ih (ALG8-CDG)	608104	ALG8	11pter-p15.5
Ii (ALG2-CDG)	607906	ALG2	9q22
Ij (DPAGT1-CDG)	608093	DPAGT1	11q23.3
Ik (ALG1-CDG)	608540	ALG1	16p13.3
1L (ALG9-CDG)	608776	ALG9	11q23
Im (DOLK-CDG)	610768	DOLK	9q34.11
In (RFT1-CDG)	612015	RFT1	3p21.1
Io (DPM3-CDG)	612937	DPM3	1q12-q21
Ip (ALG11-CDG)	613661	ALG11	13q14.3
Iq (SRD5A3-CDG)	612379	SRD5A3	4q12
Ir (DDOST-CDG)	614507	DDOST	1p36.12
It (PGM1-CDG) (formerly GSD-XIV) Phosphoglucomutase deficiency	614921	PGM1	1p31.3
DPM2-CDG	n/a	DPM2	9q34.13
TUSC3-CDG	611093	TUSC3	8p22
MAGT1-CDG	300716	MAGT1	X21.1
DHDDS-CDG	613861	DHDDS	1p36.11
I/IIx	212067	n/a	n/a

==== Type II ====
- Type II disorders involve malfunctioning trimming/processing of the protein-bound oligosaccharide chain.

Types include:

Type	OMIM	Gene	Locus
IIa (MGAT2-CDG)	212066	MGAT2	14q21
IIb (GCS1-CDG)	606056	GCS1	2p13-p12
IIc (SLC335C1-CDG; Leukocyte adhesion deficiency II))	266265	SLC35C1	11p11.2
IId (B4GALT1-CDG)	607091	B4GALT1	9p13
IIe (COG7-CDG)	608779	COG7	16p
IIf (SLC35A1-CDG)	603585	SLC35A1	6q15
IIg (COG1-CDG)	611209	COG1	17q25.1
IIh (COG8-CDG)	611182	COG8	16q22.1
IIi (COG5-CDG)	613612	COG5	7q31
IIj (COG4-CDG)	613489	COG4	16q22.1
IIL (COG6-CDG)	n/a	COG6	13q14.11
IIT (CDG2T)	618885	GALNT2	
ATP6V0A2-CDG (autosomal recessive cutis laxa type 2a (ARCL-2A))	219200	ATP6V0A2	12q24.31
MAN1B1-CDG (Intellectual disability, autosomal recessive 15)	614202	MAN1B1	9q34.3
ST3GAL3-CDG (Intellectual disability, autosomal recessive 12)	611090	ST3GAL3	1p34.1

==== Disorders of O-mannosylation ====
- Disorders with deficient α-dystroglycan O-mannosylation.

Mutations in several genes have been associated with the traditional clinical syndromes, termed muscular dystrophy-dystroglycanopathies (MDDG). A new nomenclature based on clinical severity and genetic cause was recently proposed by OMIM. The severity classifications are A (severe), B (intermediate), and C (mild). The subtypes are numbered one to six according to the genetic cause, in the following order: (1) POMT1, (2) POMT2, (3) POMGNT1, (4) FKTN, (5) FKRP, and (6) LARGE.

Most common severe types include:

Name	OMIM	Gene	Locus
POMT1-CDG (MDDGA1;Walker–Warburg syndrome)	236670	POMT1	9q34.13
POMT2-CDG (MDDGA2;Walker–Warburg syndrome)	613150	POMT2	14q24.3
POMGNT1-CDG (MDDGA3; Muscle–eye–brain)	253280	POMGNT1	1p34.1
FKTN-CDG (MDDGA4; Fukuyama congenital muscular dystrophy)	253800	FKTN	9q31.2
FKRP-CDG (MDDGB5; MDC1C)	606612	FKRP	19q13.32
LARGE-CDG (MDDGB6; MDC1D)	608840	LARGE	22q12.3

== Treatment ==
No treatment is available for most of these disorders. Mannose supplementation relieves the symptoms in MPI-CDG for the most part, even though the hepatic fibrosis may persist. Fucose supplementation has had a partial effect on some SLC35C1-CDG patients.

In 2024, it was reported that a study suggested that Ibuprofen might be helpful as a treatment for one such genetic disease.

== History ==
The first CDG patients (twin sisters) were described in 1980 by Jaeken et al. Their main features were psychomotor retardation, cerebral and cerebellar atrophy and fluctuating hormone levels (e.g.prolactin, FSH and GH). During the next 15 years the underlying defect remained unknown but since the plasmaprotein transferrin was underglycosylated (as shown by e.g. isoelectric focusing), the new syndrome was named carbohydrate-deficient glycoprotein syndrome (CDGS) Its "classic" phenotype included psychomotor retardation, ataxia, strabismus, anomalies (fat pads and inverted nipples) and coagulopathy.

In 1994, a new phenotype was described and named CDGS-II. In 1995, Van Schaftingen and Jaeken showed that CDGS-I (now PMM2-CDG) was caused by the deficiency of the enzyme phosphomannomutase. This enzyme is responsible for the interconversion of mannose-6-phosphate and mannose-1-phosphate, and its deficiency leads to a shortage in GDP-mannose and dolichol (Dol)-mannose (Man), two donors required for the synthesis of the lipid-linked oligosaccharide precursor of N-linked glycosylation.

In 1998, Niehues described a new CDG syndrome, MPI-CDG, which is caused by mutations in the enzyme metabolically upstream of PMM2, phosphomannose isomerase (PMI). A functional therapy for MPI-CDG, alimentary mannose was also described.

The characterization of new defects took increased and several new Type I and Type II defects were delineated.

In 2012, Need described the first case of a congenital disorder of deglycosylation, NGLY1 deficiency. A 2014 study of NGLY1 deficient patients found similarities with traditional congenital disorders of glycosylation.

== See also ==
- Inborn error of metabolism
- Leukocyte adhesion deficiency
- PMM2 deficiency
