= DPM2 =

Protein-coding gene in the species Homo sapiens

Identifiers
- Aliases: DPM2, CDG1U, dolichyl-phosphate mannosyltransferase polypeptide 2, regulatory subunit, dolichyl-phosphate mannosyltransferase subunit 2, regulatory
- External IDs: OMIM: 603564; MGI: 1330238; HomoloGene: 99726; GeneCards: DPM2; OMA:DPM2 - orthologs

Gene location (Human)
Chr.	Chromosome 9 (human)
Band	9q34.11	Start	127,935,099 bp
Band	9q34.11	End	127,938,484 bp

Gene location (Mouse)
Chr.	Chromosome 2 (mouse)
Band	2|2 B	Start	32,460,870 bp
Band	2|2 B	End	32,463,591 bp
RNA expression pattern
Bgee	Human / Mouse (ortholog); Top expressed in: body of pancreas; left lobe of thyroid gland; right lobe of thyroid gland; body of stomach; right uterine tube; mucosa of transverse colon; islet of Langerhans; stromal cell of endometrium; right frontal lobe; minor salivary glands / Top expressed in: yolk sac; perirhinal cortex; entorhinal cortex; granulocyte; superior frontal gyrus; primary visual cortex; neural tube; CA3 field; internal carotid artery; lip; More reference expression data
BioGPS	n/a
Gene ontology
Molecular function	dolichyl-phosphate beta-D-mannosyltransferase activity; protein binding; enzyme regulator activity
Cellular component	integral component of membrane; endoplasmic reticulum membrane; membrane; integral component of endoplasmic reticulum membrane; endoplasmic reticulum; dolichol-phosphate-mannose synthase complex; glycosylphosphatidylinositol-N-acetylglucosaminyltransferase (GPI-GnT) complex
Biological process	preassembly of GPI anchor in ER membrane; regulation of protein stability; protein O-linked mannosylation; protein glycosylation; GPI anchor biosynthetic process; regulation of catalytic activity; dolichol metabolic process; protein N-linked glycosylation via asparagine
Sources:Amigo / QuickGO
Orthologs
Species	Human	Mouse
Entrez	8818	13481
Ensembl	ENSG00000136908	ENSMUSG00000026810
UniProt	O94777	Q9Z324
RefSeq (mRNA)	NM_152690; NM_003863	NM_010073
RefSeq (protein)	NP_003854; NP_001365365; NP_001365366	NP_034203
Location (UCSC)	Chr 9: 127.94 – 127.94 Mb	Chr 2: 32.46 – 32.46 Mb
PubMed search
- Wikidata
View/Edit Human	View/Edit Mouse

Dolichol phosphate-mannose biosynthesis regulatory protein is a protein that in humans is encoded by the DPM2 gene.

== Function ==
Dolichol-phosphate mannose (Dol-P-Man) serves as a donor of mannosyl residues on the lumenal side of the endoplasmic reticulum (ER). Lack of Dol-P-Man results in defective surface expression of GPI-anchored proteins, defective N-linked glycosylation and deficient O-mannosylation of α-dystroglycan. Dol-P-Man is synthesized from GDP-mannose and dolichol-phosphate on the cytosolic side of the ER by the enzyme dolichyl-phosphate mannosyltransferase. The protein encoded by this gene is a hydrophobic protein that contains 2 predicted transmembrane domains and a putative ER localization signal near the C-terminus. This protein associates with DPM1 in vivo and is required for the ER localization and stable expression of DPM1 and also enhances the binding of dolichol-phosphate to DPM1.

== Clinical significance ==
Mutations in this gene are associated with congenital disorder of glycosylation.
