= Polyprenyl synthetase =

InterPro Family

polyprenyl_synt
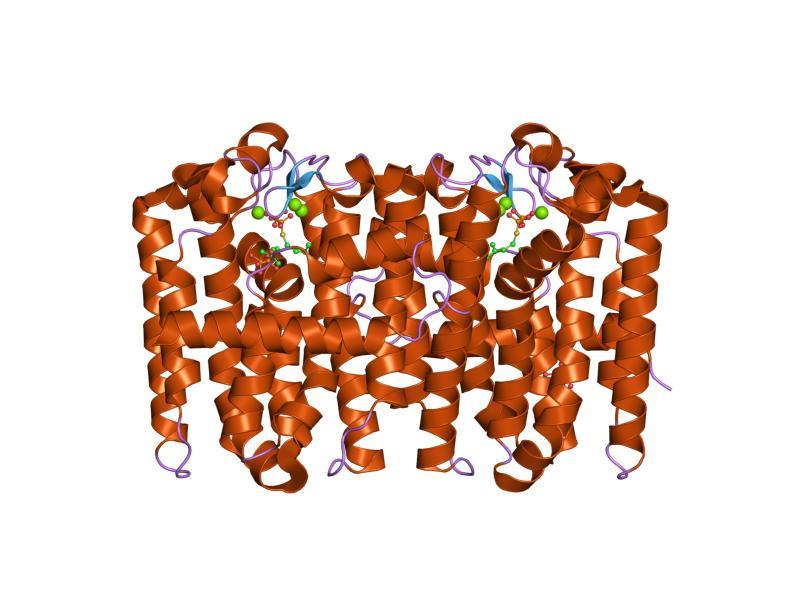
- active conformation of farnesyl pyrophosphate synthase bound to isopentyl pyrophosphate and dimethylallyl s-thiolodiphosphate

Identifiers
- Symbol: polyprenyl_synt
- Pfam: PF00348
- InterPro: IPR000092
- PROSITE: PDOC00407
- SCOP2: 1fps / SCOPe / SUPFAM
- OPM superfamily: 37
- OPM protein: 1rqj
Available protein structures:
- PDB: IPR000092 PF00348 (ECOD; PDBsum)
- AlphaFold: IPR000092; PF00348

Polyprenyl synthetases are a class of enzymes responsible for synthesis of isoprenoids. Isoprenoid compounds are synthesized by various organisms. For example, in eukaryotes the isoprenoid biosynthetic pathway is responsible for the synthesis of a variety of end products including cholesterol, dolichol, ubiquinone or coenzyme Q. In bacteria this pathway leads to the synthesis of isopentenyl tRNA, isoprenoid quinones, and sugar carrier lipids. Among the enzymes that participate in that pathway, are a number of polyprenyl synthetase enzymes which catalyze a 1'4-condensation between 5-carbon isoprene units. It has been shown that all the above enzymes share some regions of sequence similarity. Two of these regions are rich in aspartic-acid residues and could be involved in the catalytic mechanism and/or the binding of the substrates.
