= Dolichyldiphosphatase =

Class of enzymes

dolichyldiphosphatase

Identifiers
- EC no.: 3.6.1.43
- CAS no.: 73361-26-9

Databases
- BRENDA: enzyme data
- ExPASy: NiceZyme view
- KEGG: enzyme entry
- MetaCyc: metabolic pathway
- Rhea: reactions
- PDB structures: RCSB PDB PDBe PDBsum
- Gene Ontology: AmiGO / QuickGO
Search
- PMC: articles
- PubMed: articles
- NCBI: proteins

In enzymology, a dolichyldiphosphatase (EC 3.6.1.43) is an enzyme that catalyzes the chemical reaction

dolichyl diphosphate + H_{2}O $\rightleftharpoons$ dolichyl phosphate + phosphate

Thus, the two substrates of this enzyme are dolichyl diphosphate and H_{2}O, whereas its two products are dolichyl phosphate and phosphate.

This enzyme belongs to the family of hydrolases, specifically those acting on acid anhydrides in phosphorus-containing anhydrides. The systematic name of this enzyme class is dolichyl-diphosphate phosphohydrolase. Other names in common use include dolichol diphosphatase, dolichyl pyrophosphatase, dolichyl pyrophosphate phosphatase, dolichyl diphosphate phosphohydrolase, and Dol-P-P phosphohydrolase. This enzyme participates in n-glycan biosynthesis.
