= Oligosaccharide-diphosphodolichol diphosphatase =

Class of enzymes

oligosaccharide-diphosphodolichol diphosphatase

Identifiers
- EC no.: 3.6.1.44
- CAS no.: 117698-28-9

Databases
- IntEnz: IntEnz view
- BRENDA: BRENDA entry
- ExPASy: NiceZyme view
- KEGG: KEGG entry
- MetaCyc: metabolic pathway
- PRIAM: profile
- PDB structures: RCSB PDB PDBe PDBsum
- Gene Ontology: AmiGO / QuickGO
Search
- PMC: articles
- PubMed: articles
- NCBI: proteins

In enzymology, an oligosaccharide-diphosphodolichol diphosphatase (EC 3.6.1.44) is an enzyme that catalyzes the chemical reaction

oligosaccharide-diphosphodolichol + H_{2}O $\rightleftharpoons$ oligosaccharide phosphate + dolichyl phosphate

Thus, the two substrates of this enzyme are oligosaccharide-diphosphodolichol and H_{2}O, whereas its two products are oligosaccharide phosphate and dolichyl phosphate.

This enzyme belongs to the family of hydrolases, specifically those acting on acid anhydrides in phosphorus-containing anhydrides. The systematic name of this enzyme class is oligosaccharide-diphosphodolichol phosphodolichohydrolase. This enzyme is also called oligosaccharide-diphosphodolichol pyrophosphatase.
