= MPDU1 =

Protein-coding gene in the species Homo sapiens

Identifiers
- Aliases: MPDU1, CDGIF, HBEBP2BPA, Lec35, My008, PP3958, PQLC5, SL15, mannose-P-dolichol utilization defect 1, SLC66A5
- External IDs: OMIM: 604041; MGI: 1346040; GeneCards: MPDU1

Gene location (Human)
| Chr. | Chromosome 17 (human) |
| Band | 17p13.1 | Start | 7,583,529 bp |
| Band | 17p13.1 | End | 7,592,789 bp |

Gene location (Mouse)
| Chr. | Chromosome 11 (mouse) |
| Band | 11 B3|11 42.86 cM | Start | 69,547,523 bp |
| Band | 11 B3|11 42.86 cM | End | 69,553,468 bp |
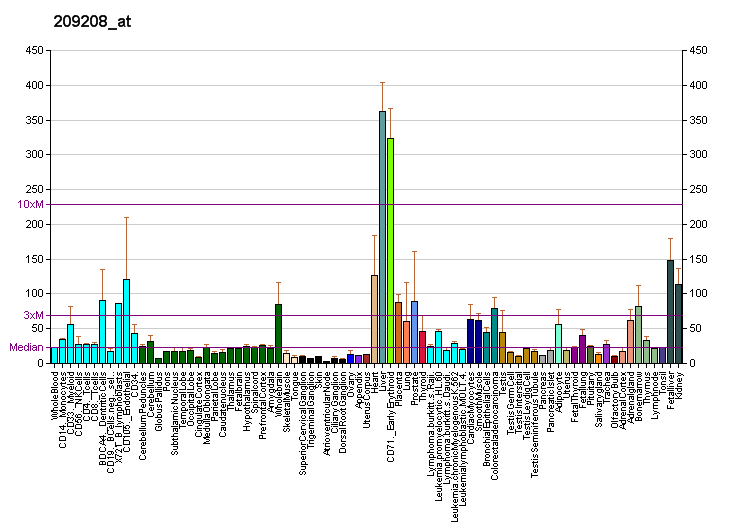
RNA expression pattern
| Bgee | Human / Mouse (ortholog); Top expressed in: rectum; mucosa of transverse colon; islet of Langerhans; right lobe of liver; right adrenal cortex; left adrenal gland; left adrenal cortex; granulocyte; gallbladder; body of stomach / Top expressed in: yolk sac; neural layer of retina; lip; right kidney; morula; morula; granulocyte; ventricular zone; ankle joint; duodenum; More reference expression data |
| BioGPS | More reference expression data |
Gene ontology
| Molecular function | protein binding |
| Cellular component | integral component of membrane; extracellular exosome; endoplasmic reticulum membrane; membrane; mitochondrion; endoplasmic reticulum |
| Biological process | dolichol-linked oligosaccharide biosynthetic process; oligosaccharide biosynthetic process; protein folding; transport |
Sources:Amigo / QuickGO
Orthologs
| Databases | NCBI: entry; OMA: entry |
| Species | Human | Mouse |
| Entrez | 9526 | 24070 |
| Ensembl | ENSG00000129255 | ENSMUSG00000018761 |
| UniProt | O75352 | Q9R0Q9 |
| RefSeq (mRNA) | NM_004870; NM_001330073 | NM_001301710; NM_001301711; NM_011900 |
| RefSeq (protein) | NP_001317002; NP_004861 | n/a |
| Location (UCSC) | Chr 17: 7.58 – 7.59 Mb | Chr 11: 69.55 – 69.55 Mb |
| PubMed search |
- Wikidata
| View/Edit Human | View/Edit Mouse |

Mannose-P-dolichol utilization defect 1 protein is a protein that in humans is encoded by the MPDU1 gene.

== See also ==
- Dolichol monophosphate mannose
- Congenital disorder of glycosylation
