= Dolichylation =

Covalent addition of a dolichol group to a protein

In biochemistry, dolichylation is the covalent addition of a dolichol group to a protein. This post-translational modification has been shown to occur in a number of eukaryotes, including the malarial parasite Plasmodium falciparum.
