= S-309309 =

Anti-obesity drug

Legal status
- Legal status: Investigational

Identifiers
- IUPAC name: N-[(4R)-5,7-difluoro-2'-(5-methylpyridin-2-yl)-4'-oxospiro[2,3-dihydrochromene-4,6'-5,7-dihydropyrazolo[4,3-c]pyridine]-3'-yl]-2-methylsulfonylacetamide
- CAS Number: 2267352-04-3
- PubChem CID: 153266620
- UNII: MP2C35M6H6

Chemical and physical data
- Formula: C_{23}H_{21}F_{2}N_{5}O_{5}S
- Molar mass: 517.51 g·mol^{−1}
- 3D model (JSmol): Interactive image
- SMILES: FC1=C2[C@@]3(CC=4C(C(=O)N3)=C(NC(CS(C)(=O)=O)=O)N(N4)C5=CC=C(C)C=N5)CCOC2=CC(F)=C1
- InChI: InChI=1S/C23H21F2N5O5S/c1-12-3-4-17(26-10-12)30-21(27-18(31)11-36(2,33)34)19-15(29-30)9-23(28-22(19)32)5-6-35-16-8-13(24)7-14(25)20(16)23/h3-4,7-8,10H,5-6,9,11H2,1-2H3,(H,27,31)(H,28,32)/t23-/m0/s1; Key:WWHHALBVCASKPG-QHCPKHFHSA-N

S-309309 is an experimental MGAT2 inhibitor developed as an anti-obesity drug by the Japanese company Shionogi. Phase II trial results are expected in late 2023.
