= PMM2 =

Protein-coding gene in the species Homo sapiens

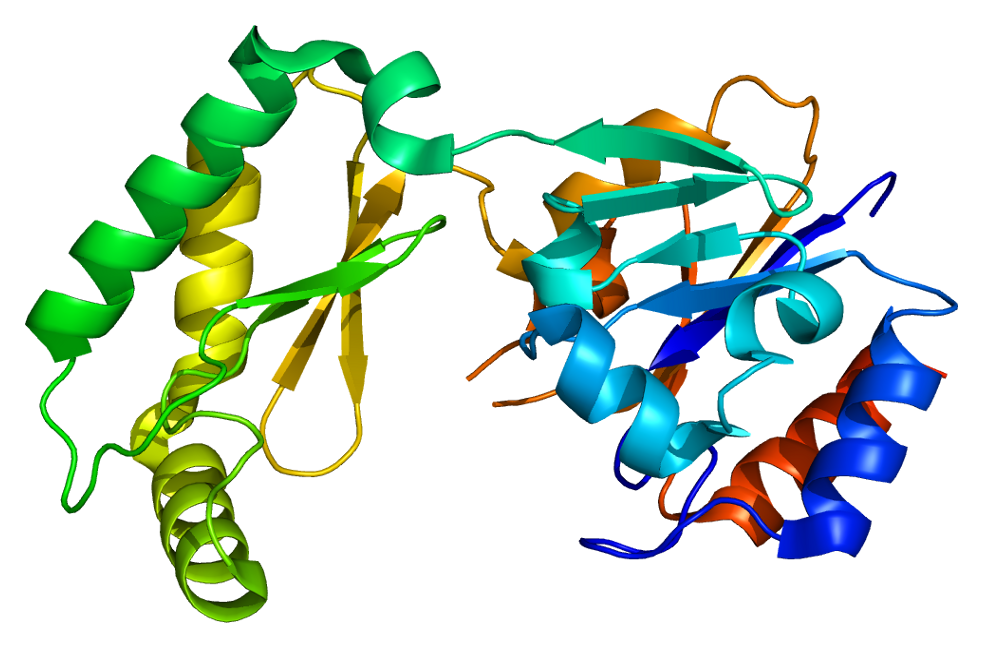

Identifiers
- Aliases: PMM2, CDG1, CDG1a, CDGS, PMI, PMI1, PMM 2, phosphomannomutase 2
- External IDs: OMIM: 601785; MGI: 1859214; GeneCards: PMM2
Available structures
PDB	Ortholog search: PDBe RCSB
PDB	List of PDB id codes 2AMY, 2Q4R
Enzyme activity
EC #	BRENDA	ExPASy	KEGG	MetaCyc
5.4.2.8	↗	↗	↗	↗

Gene location (Mouse)
Chr.	Chromosome 16 (mouse)
Band	16|16 A1	Start	8,455,538 bp
Band	16|16 A1	End	8,480,331 bp
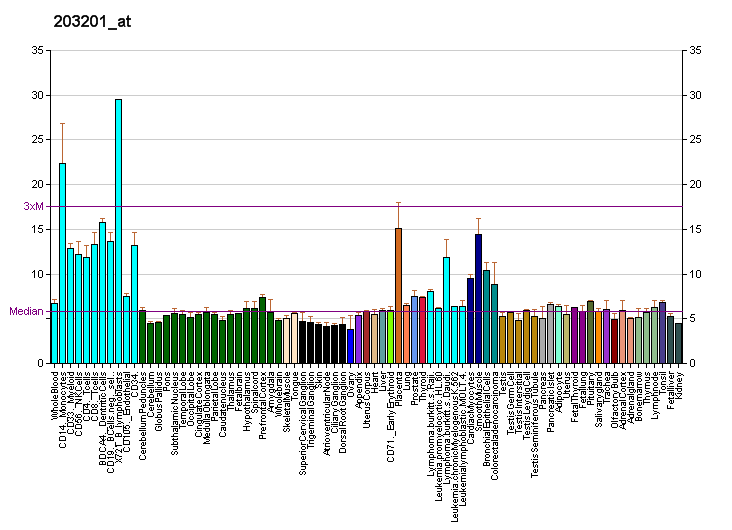
RNA expression pattern
Bgee	Human / Mouse (ortholog); Top expressed in: body of pancreas; Achilles tendon; rectum; bone marrow cell; sural nerve; thymus; duodenum; placenta; right lobe of liver; endometrium / Top expressed in: seminal vesicula; yolk sac; spermatocyte; salivary gland; duodenum; crypt of lieberkuhn of small intestine; parotid gland; jejunum; pyloric antrum; morula; More reference expression data
BioGPS	More reference expression data
Gene ontology
Molecular function	isomerase activity; protein binding; phosphomannomutase activity
Cellular component	cytoplasm; soma; nucleus; cytosol
Biological process	protein glycosylation; GDP-mannose biosynthetic process; mannose metabolic process; protein N-linked glycosylation; protein targeting to ER
Sources:Amigo / QuickGO
Orthologs
Databases	NCBI: entry
Species	Human	Mouse
Entrez	5373	54128
Ensembl	n/a	ENSMUSG00000022711
UniProt	O15305	Q9Z2M7
RefSeq (mRNA)	NM_000303	NM_016881; NM_001362485
RefSeq (protein)	NP_000294	NP_058577; NP_001349414
Location (UCSC)	n/a	Chr 16: 8.46 – 8.48 Mb
PubMed search
- Wikidata
View/Edit Human	View/Edit Mouse

Phosphomannomutase 2 is an enzyme that in humans is encoded by the PMM2 gene.

== Function ==
Phosphomannomutase 2 catalyzes the isomerization of mannose 6-phosphate to mannose 1-phosphate. Mannose 1-phosphate is a precursor to GDP-mannose necessary for the synthesis of dolichol-P-oligosaccharides. Mutations in the gene have been shown to cause defects in the protein glycosylation pathway which manifest as the congenital disorder of glycosylation PMM2 deficiency.
