= DPAGT1 =

Protein-coding gene in the species Homo sapiens

Identifiers
- Aliases: DPAGT1, ALG7, CDG-Ij, CDG1J, CMSTA2, D11S366, DGPT, DPAGT, DPAGT2, G1PT, GPT, UAGT, UGAT, CMS13, dolichyl-phosphate N-acetylglucosaminephosphotransferase 1
- External IDs: OMIM: 191350; MGI: 1196396; GeneCards: DPAGT1
Enzyme activity
| EC # | BRENDA | ExPASy | KEGG | MetaCyc |
|---|---|---|---|---|
| 2.7.8.15 | ↗ | ↗ | ↗ | ↗ |

Gene location (Human)
| Chr. | Chromosome 11 (human) |
| Band | 11q23.3 | Start | 119,096,025 bp |
| Band | 11q23.3 | End | 119,108,331 bp |

Gene location (Mouse)
| Chr. | Chromosome 9 (mouse) |
| Band | 9 A5.2|9 24.84 cM | Start | 44,237,316 bp |
| Band | 9 A5.2|9 24.84 cM | End | 44,245,197 bp |
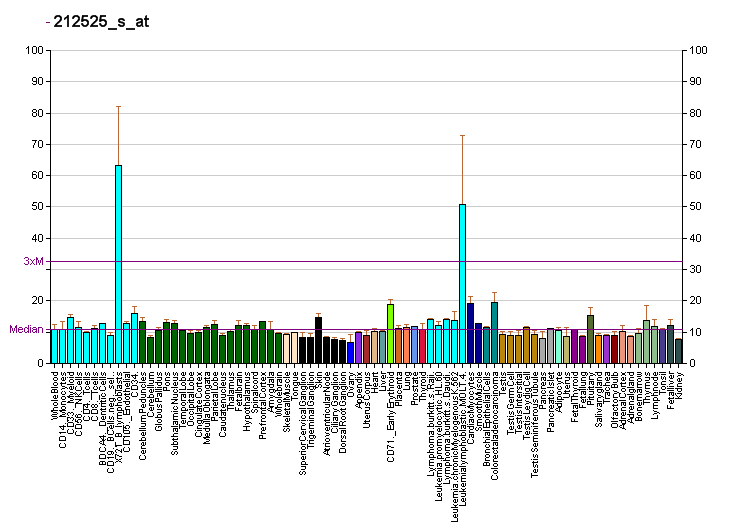

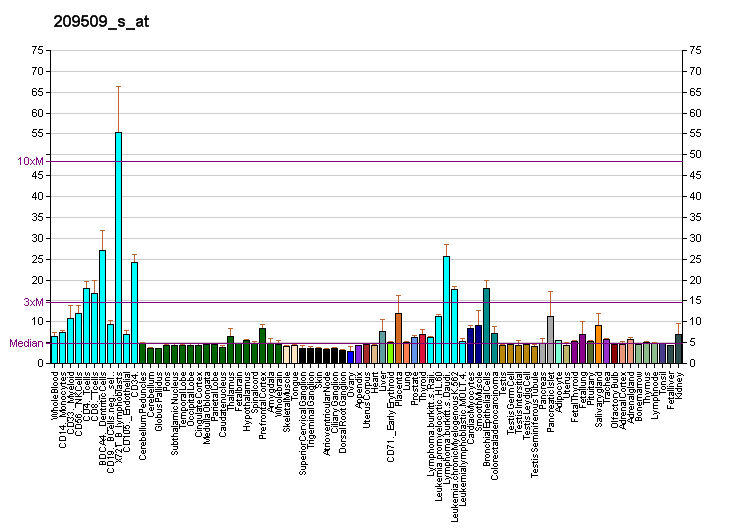
RNA expression pattern
| Bgee | Human / Mouse (ortholog); Top expressed in: mucosa of transverse colon; body of pancreas; right adrenal gland; right adrenal cortex; stromal cell of endometrium; left adrenal gland; left adrenal cortex; right lobe of liver; right uterine tube; rectum / Top expressed in: yolk sac; seminal vesicula; tail of embryo; genital tubercle; muscle of thigh; lacrimal gland; decidua; parotid gland; ankle joint; facial motor nucleus; More reference expression data |
| BioGPS | More reference expression data |
Gene ontology
| Molecular function | transferase activity; UDP-N-acetylglucosamine-lysosomal-enzyme N-acetylglucosaminephosphotransferase activity; phospho-N-acetylmuramoyl-pentapeptide-transferase activity; glycosyltransferase activity; UDP-N-acetylglucosamine-dolichyl-phosphate N-acetylglucosaminephosphotransferase activity; metal ion binding |
| Cellular component | integral component of endoplasmic reticulum membrane; endoplasmic reticulum membrane; membrane; intracellular membrane-bounded organelle; endoplasmic reticulum; integral component of membrane |
| Biological process | protein glycosylation; dolichol-linked oligosaccharide biosynthetic process; dolichol metabolic process; protein complex oligomerization; UDP-N-acetylglucosamine metabolic process; protein N-linked glycosylation; dolichyl diphosphate biosynthetic process |
Sources:Amigo / QuickGO
Orthologs
| Databases | NCBI: entry; OMA: entry |
| Species | Human | Mouse |
| Entrez | 1798 | 13478 |
| Ensembl | ENSG00000172269 | ENSMUSG00000032123 |
| UniProt | Q9H3H5 | P42867 |
| RefSeq (mRNA) | NM_001382; NM_203316 | NM_007875; NM_001364464 |
| RefSeq (protein) | NP_001373 | NP_031901; NP_001351393 |
| Location (UCSC) | Chr 11: 119.1 – 119.11 Mb | Chr 9: 44.24 – 44.25 Mb |
| PubMed search |
- Wikidata
| View/Edit Human | View/Edit Mouse |

UDP-N-acetylglucosamine—dolichyl-phosphate N-acetylglucosaminephosphotransferase is an enzyme that in humans is encoded by the DPAGT1 gene.

Mutations in DPAGT1 cause myasthenia.

The protein encoded by this gene is an enzyme that catalyzes the first step in the dolichol-linked oligosaccharide pathway (also see Genetic pathway) for glycoprotein biosynthesis. This enzyme belongs to the glycosyltransferase family 4. This protein is an integral membrane protein of the endoplasmic reticulum. The congenital disorder of glycosylation type Ij is caused by mutation in the gene encoding this enzyme. Alternatively spliced transcript variants encoding different isoforms have been identified.

== Chemistry ==
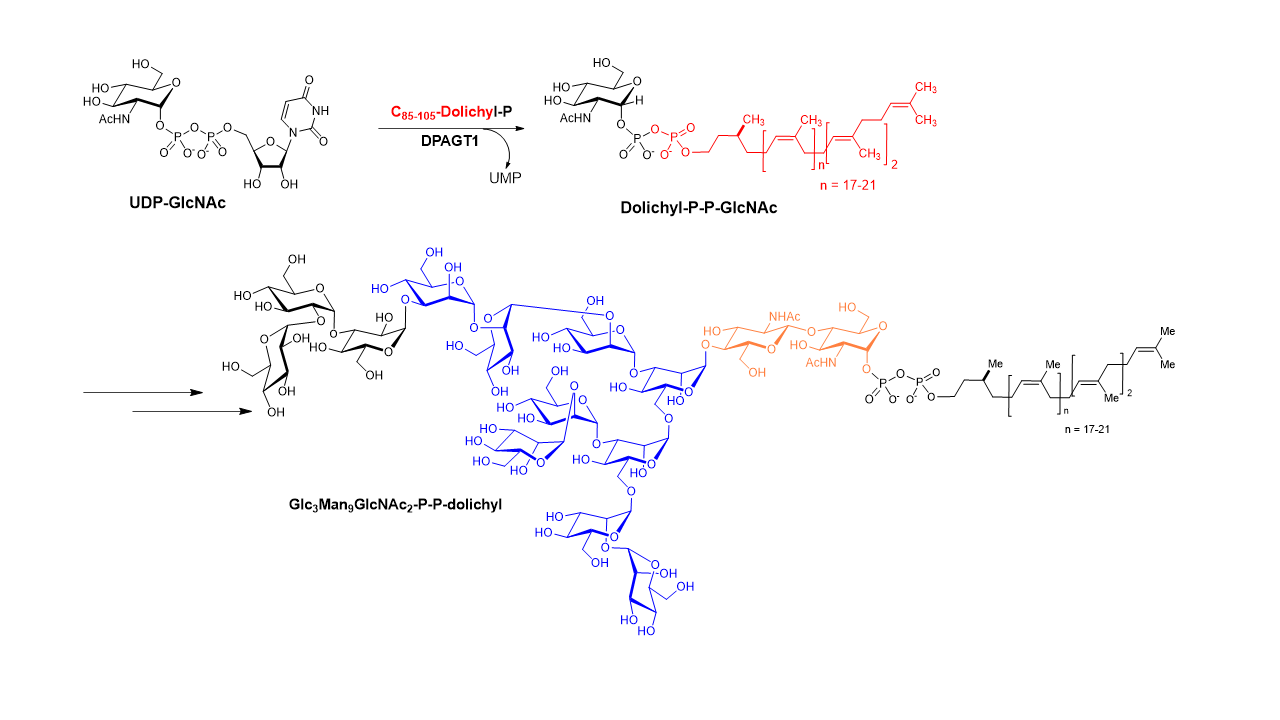
Synthesis of Dolichyl-P-P-GlcNAc from UPD-GlcNAc and Dolichyl-P via DPAGT1 in N-Glycan Biosynthesis

DPAGT1 catalyzes the transformation of dolichyl-phosphate N-acetylglucosamine from Uridine diphosphate N-acetylglucosamine (UDP-GlcNAc) and dolichyl-phosphata, which is the first step in N-glycan biosynthesis in mammalian cells.

Uridine diphosphate N-acetylglucosamine + dolichyl-phosphate ↔ dolichyl-phosphate N-acetylglucosamine + UMP

The generated dolichyl-phosphate N-acetylglucosamine is modified via sequential glycosyltransferases, forming Glc3Man9GlcNAc2-P-P-dolichyl which is used for glycosylation of asparagine (Asn or N) residue of polypeptides.

== Structure ==
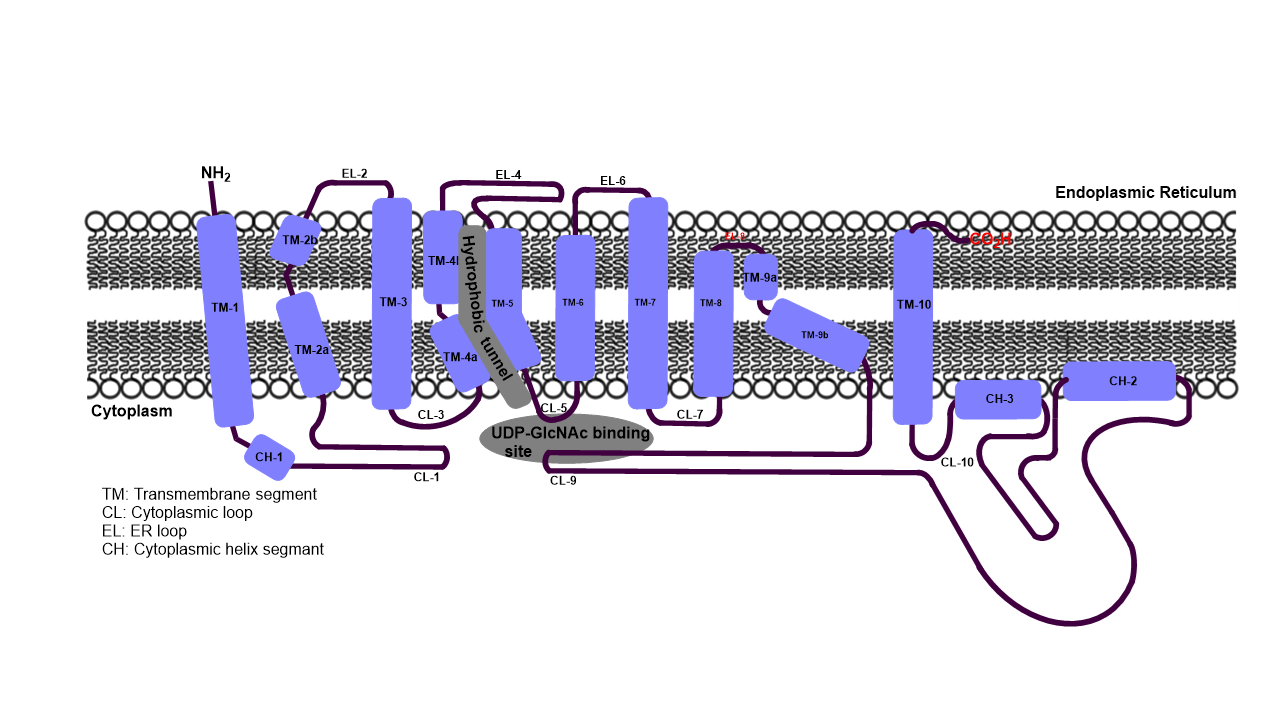
Topology of DPAGT1

Despite the challenge of obtaining eukaryotic membrane protein structure, co-crystal structures of DPAGT1 with tunicamycin or UDP-GlcNAc have been reported in 2018. DPAGT1 consists of 10 transmembrane segments (TM1 to 10). Three loops on the endoplasmic reticulum (ER) side and five loops on the cytoplasmic side (Loops A-E) connect the transmembrane segments, where TM4, TM5, TM7, TM8, TM9, Loop A, Loop E form the UDP-GlcNAc binding domain. Dolichyl-phosphate (Dol-P) is predicted to bind the "hydrophobic tunnel" created by TM4, TM5 and TM9 within the lipid bilayer. The uridine moiety of tunicamycin occupies the identical binding sites of UDP-GlcNAc. The lipid tail moiety of tunicamycin occupies the hydrophobic tunnel. Significant conformational changes are observed in the C-terminal end of TM-9, Loop A, and Loop E in DPAGT1-ligand bound structures.

== Biochemistry ==
Changes and diversification of the expression profile of cell surface glycans based on the underlying glycobiology have received significant attention from the scientific community. N-Linked and O-linked glycans are the most abundant forms of protein glycosylation and occur on proteins destined for the secretory pathway. Recent studies of cancer immunotherapy are based on the immunogenicity of truncated O-glycan chains (e.g., Tn, sTn, T, and sLea/x). Despite the prevalence of N-linked glycan changes in the development of tumor cells, therapeutic antibodies against N-linked glycans have not been developed. This is likely attributable to the lack of specificity of N-linked glycans between normal and malignant cells. Abnormal branching of N-linked glycans has been observed in certain cancer cells. Altered glycosylation of N-linked glycans in cancers is typically associated with upregulation of ß1,6-N-acetylglucosaminyltransferase-3/5 (GnT3/5), enhancing ß1,6-branching.

== DPAGT1 inhibitors ==
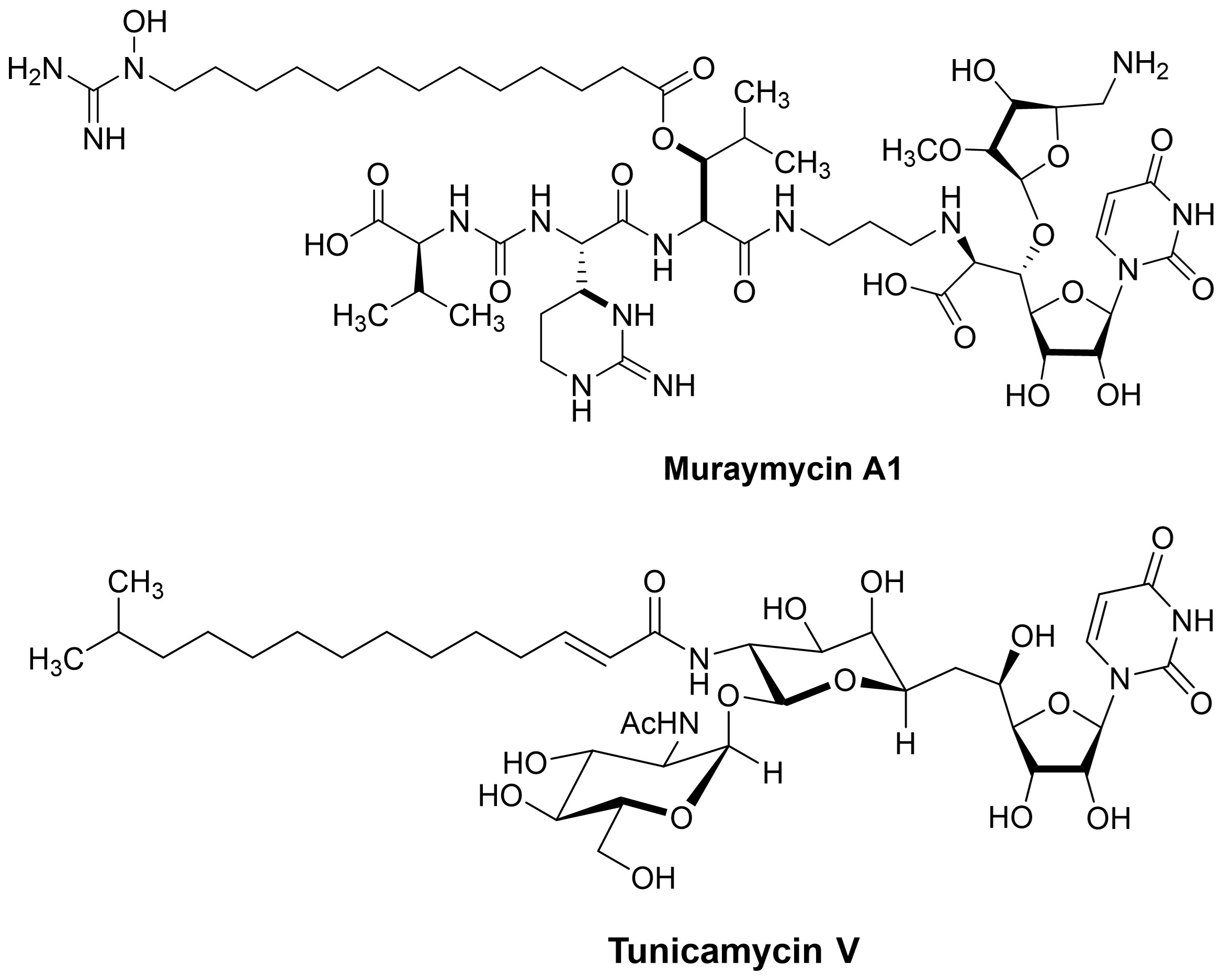

Tunicamycins (e.g., tunicamycin V, the major component) have long been used to study endoplasmic reticulum (ER) stress responses induced by the accumulation of unfolded proteins in cancer cells. However, their application in cancer biology has been limited due to off-target effects, restricting their use mainly to in vitro studies and, to a lesser extent, in vivo experiments involving intratumoral administration. More recently, the natural product muraymycin A1 was identified as a more potent inhibitor of DPAGT1 than tunicamycin V, originally characterized as a strong MraY inhibitor with antibacterial activity against Staphylococcus species, muraymycin A1 has not yet been evaluated for cytotoxicity or systemic toxicity in mouse infection models. Recent findings indicate that muraymycin A1 exhibits selective antiproliferative activity against various solid cancers. This selective toxicity of muraymycin A1, a novel DPAGT1 inhibitor, challenges the prevailing notion that the cytotoxicity of tunicamycins toward mammalian cells arises primarily from DPAGT1 inhibition. Instead, muraymycin A1 appears to induce apoptosis in solid cancers that depend on DPAGT1 overexpression for growth and progression.

== Drug discovery ==
Muraymycin A1 (MA1) is a potent DPAGT1 inhibitor that displays approximately 8.5-fold greater inhibitory activity than tunicamycin V (TM-V), while maintaining a substantially improved selectivity profile. Unlike TM-V, MA1 selectively suppresses proliferation in DPAGT1-dependent solid tumors, including pancreatic, gastric, prostate, breast, cervical, ovarian, melanoma, and head and neck cancers, with minimal effects on low-DPAGT1–expressing cancer cells or nontransformed cells. These observations strongly support the concept that selective inhibition of DPAGT1 can preferentially impair tumor growth while avoiding the widespread cytotoxicity commonly associated with tunicamycin-class natural products. In breast cancer systems, including triple-negative breast cancer (TNBC) models, MA1 demonstrated potent target-dependent antiproliferative activity without detectable toxicity toward nonmalignant epithelial, fibroblast-like, immune, or cardiomyocyte-derived cells at concentrations up to at least 100 µM. Despite these promising biological properties, the structural complexity of MA1 presents a major obstacle for large-scale production and extended in vivo studies. Although total synthesis enables preparation of sufficient quantities for mechanistic and in vitro investigations, significant scaffold simplification is required to facilitate practical drug development. Structure–activity relationship (SAR) studies clarified several structural elements important for activity against DPAGT1. https://doi.org/10.5059/yukigoseikyokaishi.81.220 The ω-chain hydroxy group was found to play only a minor role in enzyme binding, and substitution of the C7′-carboxylic acid with a primary amide preserved inhibitory activity while improving synthetic accessibility. Moreover, elimination of the cyclic guanidyl–urea functionality produced an MA1-NH₂-truncated derivative that retained substantial DPAGT1 inhibitory activity, identifying a simplified scaffold suitable for further medicinal chemistry optimization. Building upon these SAR findings, the ω-guanidyl hydroxyleucine ester side chain was replaced with a conformationally restricted and water-soluble lipid mimetic incorporating a TMPA motif, resulting in the analogue APPB. This redesign produced a highly water-soluble inhibitor with approximately 7.2-fold greater potency against DPAGT1 compared with earlier analogues. APPB also exhibited favorable biochemical stability and pharmacokinetic behavior, supporting its advancement into in vivo efficacy studies. Consistent with these properties, APPB showed strong antitumor activity in several mouse models, including the HER2-positive HCI-012 patient-derived xenograft, orthotopic and xenograft MDA-MB-231 triple-negative breast cancer models, and the KPC-1 pancreatic cancer model, following intraperitoneal administration at doses of 5–10 mg/kg. In addition to suppressing primary tumor growth, APPB significantly reduced metastatic progression under therapeutically relevant dosing conditions. Comprehensive analyses of tumors collected from treated animals, including N-glycan profiling and immunohistochemical characterization, demonstrated that the in vivo antitumor effects of APPB are consistent with the mechanism previously established in cultured cells. These findings provide the first direct evidence that selective pharmacological inhibition of DPAGT1 can induce tumor regression and suppress tumor progression in vivo while avoiding the severe nonspecific toxicity typically associated with tunicamycin-derived compounds. Accordingly, APPB represents a promising lead structure for the continued development of DPAGT1-targeted therapeutics. Further optimization of pharmacokinetic and pharmacodynamic properties through rational lipid-mimetic design is expected to enhance therapeutic potential. Importantly, recent cryo-electron microscopy analysis of the DPAGT1–APPB complex has revealed detailed molecular interactions within the enzyme active site, thereby enabling structure-guided development of next-generation inhibitors and supporting future progression toward toxicological evaluation and clinical translation.
