= Phosphomannomutase =

phosphomannomutase
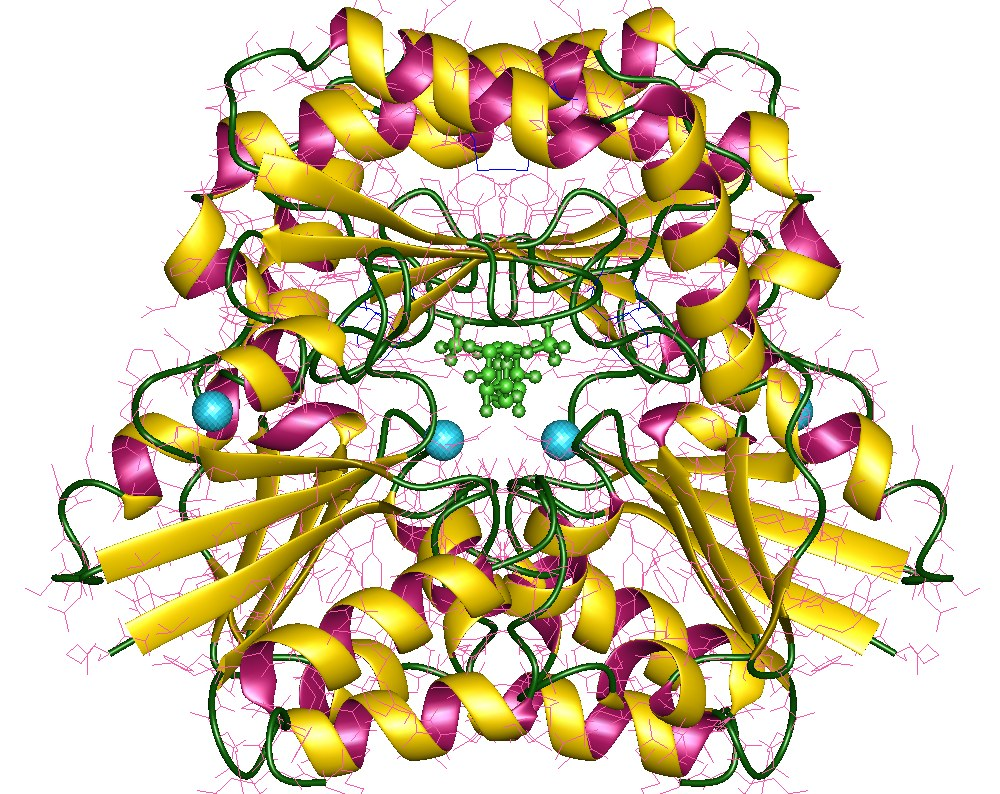
- phosphomannomutase 1, dimer, Human

Identifiers
- EC no.: 5.4.2.8
- CAS no.: 59536-73-1

Databases
- IntEnz: IntEnz view
- BRENDA: BRENDA entry
- ExPASy: NiceZyme view
- KEGG: KEGG entry
- MetaCyc: metabolic pathway
- PRIAM: profile
- PDB structures: RCSB PDB PDBe PDBsum
- Gene Ontology: AmiGO / QuickGO
Search
- PMC: articles
- PubMed: articles
- NCBI: proteins

In enzymology, a phosphomannomutase (EC 5.4.2.8) is an enzyme that catalyzes the chemical reaction

alpha-D-mannose 1-phosphate $\rightleftharpoons$ D-mannose 6-phosphate

Hence, this enzyme has one substrate, alpha-D-mannose 1-phosphate, and one product, D-mannose 6-phosphate.

This enzyme belongs to the family of isomerases, specifically the phosphotransferases (phosphomutases), which transfer phosphate groups within a molecule. The systematic name of this enzyme class is alpha-D-mannose 1,6-phosphomutase. Other names in common use include mannose phosphomutase, phosphomannose mutase, and D-mannose 1,6-phosphomutase. This enzyme participates in fructose and mannose metabolism. It has 2 cofactors: D-glucose 1,6-bisphosphate, and D-Mannose 1,6-bisphosphate.

== Structural studies ==
As of late 2007, 18 structures have been solved for this class of enzymes, with PDB accession codes 1K2Y, 1WQA, 2AMY, 2F7L, 2FKF, 2FKM, 2FUC, 2FUE, 2H4L, 2H5A, 2I54, 2I55, and 2Q4R.
