= DPM3 =

Protein-coding gene in humans

Identifiers
- Aliases: DPM3, CDG1O, dolichyl-phosphate mannosyltransferase subunit 3, dolichyl-phosphate mannosyltransferase subunit 3, regulatory, MDDGB15, MDDGC15
- External IDs: OMIM: 605951; MGI: 1915813; GeneCards: DPM3

Gene location (Human)
Chr.	Chromosome 1 (human)
Band	1q22	Start	155,139,891 bp
Band	1q22	End	155,140,595 bp

Gene location (Mouse)
Chr.	Chromosome 3 (mouse)
Band	3|3 F1	Start	89,166,665 bp
Band	3|3 F1	End	89,174,386 bp
RNA expression pattern
Bgee	Human / Mouse (ortholog); Top expressed in: mucosa of transverse colon; anterior pituitary; left adrenal cortex; right adrenal gland; right uterine tube; right adrenal cortex; monocyte; body of pancreas; canal of the cervix; right lobe of liver / Top expressed in: intestinal villus; blastocyst; Ileal epithelium; choroid plexus of fourth ventricle; yolk sac; lip; right kidney; esophagus; lactiferous gland; ventricular zone; More reference expression data
BioGPS	n/a
Gene ontology
Molecular function	dolichyl-phosphate beta-D-mannosyltransferase activity; protein binding
Cellular component	integral component of membrane; dolichol-phosphate-mannose synthase complex; integral component of endoplasmic reticulum membrane; mannosyltransferase complex; endoplasmic reticulum membrane; endoplasmic reticulum; membrane
Biological process	protein glycosylation; GPI anchor biosynthetic process; protein mannosylation; protein C-linked glycosylation via 2'-alpha-mannosyl-L-tryptophan; regulation of protein stability; protein O-linked mannosylation; protein N-linked glycosylation via asparagine; carbohydrate metabolic process
Sources:Amigo / QuickGO
Orthologs
Databases	NCBI: entry; OMA: entry
Species	Human	Mouse
Entrez	54344	68563
Ensembl	ENSG00000179085	ENSMUSG00000042737
UniProt	Q9P2X0; Q86TM7	Q9D1Q4
RefSeq (mRNA)	NM_153741; NM_018973	NM_026767
RefSeq (protein)	NP_061846; NP_714963; NP_714963.1	NP_081043
Location (UCSC)	Chr 1: 155.14 – 155.14 Mb	Chr 3: 89.17 – 89.17 Mb
PubMed search
- Wikidata
View/Edit Human	View/Edit Mouse

dolichyl-phosphate mannosyltransferase polypeptide 3, also known as DPM3, is a human gene.

== Function ==
Dolichol-phosphate mannose (Dol-P-Man) serves as a donor of mannosyl residues on the lumenal side of the endoplasmic reticulum (ER). Lack of Dol-P-Man results in defective surface expression of GPI-anchored proteins. Dol-P-Man is synthesized from GDP-mannose and dolichol-phosphate on the cytosolic side of the ER by the enzyme dolichyl-phosphate mannosyltransferase. The protein encoded by this gene is a subunit of dolichyl-phosphate mannosyltransferase and acts as a stabilizer subunit of the dolichyl-phosphate mannosyltransferase complex.

== Clinical significance ==
Mutations in this gene are associated with congenital disorder of glycosylation type 1O.
