= Dehydrodolichyl diphosphate synthase =

Enzyme found in humans

DHDDS

Identifiers
- Aliases: DHDDS, CIT, CPT, DS, HDS, RP59, Dehydrodolichyl diphosphate synthase, dehydrodolichyl diphosphate synthase subunit, DEDSM, hCIT
- External IDs: OMIM: 608172; MGI: 1914672; HomoloGene: 32615; GeneCards: DHDDS; OMA:DHDDS - orthologs

Gene location (Human)
Chr.	Chromosome 1 (human)
Band	1p36.11	Start	26,432,282 bp
Band	1p36.11	End	26,471,306 bp

Gene location (Mouse)
Chr.	Chromosome 4 (mouse)
Band	4|4 D3	Start	133,969,028 bp
Band	4|4 D3	End	134,000,918 bp
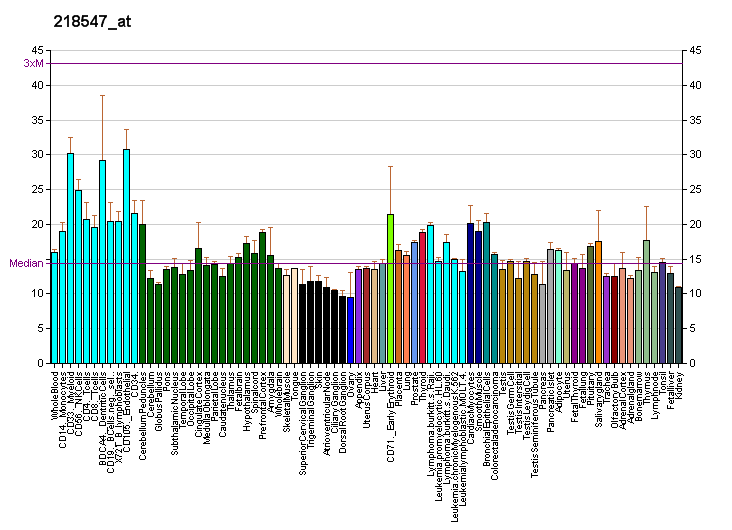
RNA expression pattern
Bgee	Human / Mouse (ortholog); Top expressed in: sperm; cerebellar hemisphere; right hemisphere of cerebellum; rectum; tendon of biceps brachii; mucosa of transverse colon; islet of Langerhans; cerebellar vermis; subcutaneous adipose tissue; epithelium of colon / Top expressed in: saccule; otic vesicle; granulocyte; interventricular septum; otic placode; right kidney; neural layer of retina; yolk sac; ventricular zone; dentate gyrus of hippocampal formation granule cell; More reference expression data
BioGPS	More reference expression data
Gene ontology
Molecular function	protein binding; polyprenyltransferase activity; transferase activity, transferring alkyl or aryl (other than methyl) groups; transferase activity; dehydrodolichyl diphosphate synthase activity
Cellular component	endoplasmic reticulum membrane; membrane; endoplasmic reticulum; dehydrodolichyl diphosphate synthase complex
Biological process	protein glycosylation; polyprenol biosynthetic process; dolichyl diphosphate biosynthetic process; lipid metabolism
Sources:Amigo / QuickGO
Orthologs
Species	Human	Mouse
Entrez	79947	67422
Ensembl	ENSG00000117682	ENSMUSG00000012117
UniProt	Q86SQ9	Q99KU1
RefSeq (mRNA)	NM_001243564; NM_001243565; NM_024887; NM_205861; NM_001319959	NM_026144
RefSeq (protein)	NP_001230493; NP_001230494; NP_001306888; NP_079163; NP_995583	NP_080420; NP_001349888; NP_001349889; NP_001349890; NP_001349891
Location (UCSC)	Chr 1: 26.43 – 26.47 Mb	Chr 4: 133.97 – 134 Mb
PubMed search
- Wikidata
View/Edit Human	View/Edit Mouse

Dehydrodolichyl diphosphate synthase is an enzyme that in humans is encoded by the DHDDS gene.

== Function ==
Dehydrodolichyl diphosphate (dedol-PP) synthase catalyzes cis-prenyl chain elongation to produce the polyprenyl backbone of dolichol, a glycosyl carrier lipid required for the biosynthesis of several classes of glycoproteins.

== Clinical significance ==
It has been suggested that missense mutations in the DHDDS gene are responsible for certain variants of retinitis pigmentosa. Since it is involved in the early steps of dolichol synthesis, vital e.g. for correct N-glycosylation, a disease caused by mutations in DHDDS should be considered a congenital disorder of glycosylation (and named DHDDS-CDG according to the novel nomenclature of CDGs). Many CDG subtypes present with retinitis pigmentosa as a major feature.
