= PMM2 deficiency =

- Other names: Carbohydrate-deficient Glycoprotein Syndrome (CDGS) Type Ia, Congenital Disorder of Glycosylation (CDG) Type Ia, Phosphomannomutase Deficiency, Jaeken Syndrome, PMM2-CDG , CDG1a
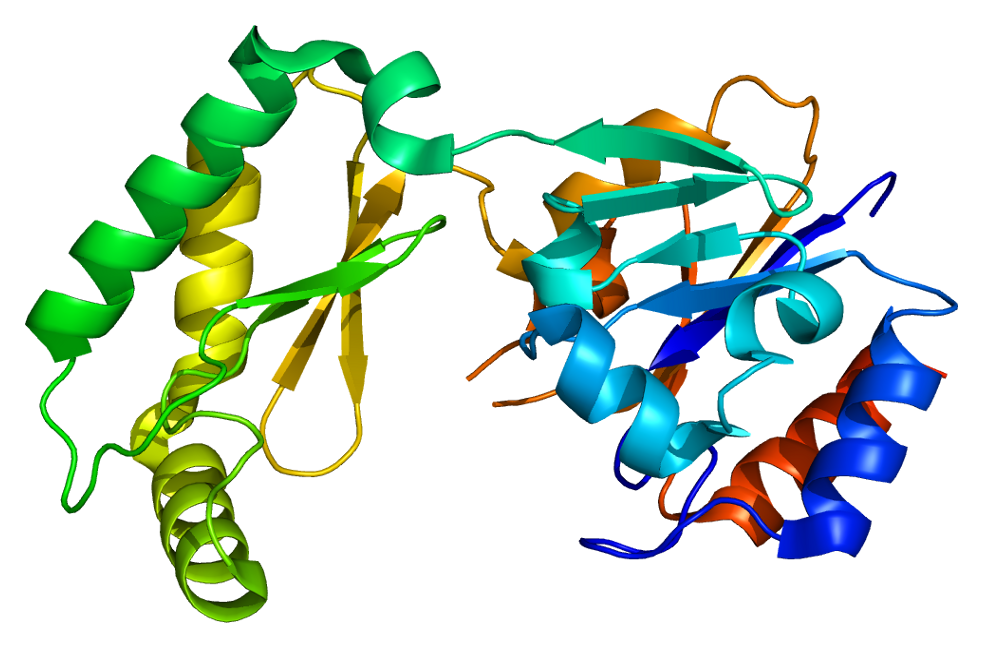
- PMM2 protein

PMM2 deficiency or PMM2-CDG, previously CDG-Ia, is a very rare genetic disorder caused by mutations in PMM2. It is an autosomal recessive disease that is the most common type of congenital disorder of glycosylation or CDG. PMM2-CDG is the most common of a growing family of more than 130 extremely rare inherited metabolic disorders. Only about 800 children and adults have been reported worldwide.

== Signs and symptoms ==
- Failure to thrive (FTT) - Failure to gain weight and grow at the expected rate.
- Cerebellar hypoplasia - Small cerebellum, which is the part of the brain that coordinates movement.
- Liver disease - Elevated liver function tests.
- Pericardial effusion - Fluid around the heart.
- Peripheral neuropathy (PN) - Impaired nerve impulse transmission to the legs. Patients do not respond well to reflex tests.
- Strabismus - Crossed eyes, mainly presented as infantile esotropia
- Nystagmus - Involuntary eye movements caused by cerebellar ataxia.
- Hypotonia - Weak muscle tone, commonly known as floppy baby syndrome.

== Cause ==
PMM2 deficiency is mostly caused by different loss-of-function mutations in the PMM2 gene on chromosome 16.

== Diagnosis ==
PMM2 deficiency is diagnosed through genetic sequencing. More than 115 mutations in the PMM2 gene have been found to cause this disease.

== Treatment ==
Treatment with mannose powder 1 to 2 g / kg per day results in significant improvement in protein glycosylation after 1 year. Other treatments involve management of the symptoms that are apparent in each individual, including physical therapy to improve core strength and mobility, occupational therapy for coordination, speech therapy for talking and eating.
