= ALG11 =

Protein-coding gene in the species Homo sapiens

Identifiers
- Aliases: ALG11, CDG1P, GT8, alpha-1,2-mannosyltransferase, ALG11 alpha-1,2-mannosyltransferase
- External IDs: OMIM: 613666; MGI: 2142632; GeneCards: ALG11
Enzyme activity
EC #	BRENDA	ExPASy	KEGG	MetaCyc
2.4.1.131	↗	↗	↗	↗

Gene location (Human)
Chr.	Chromosome 13 (human)
Band	13q14.3	Start	52,012,391 bp
Band	13q14.3	End	52,079,232 bp

Gene location (Mouse)
Chr.	Chromosome 8 (mouse)
Band	8|8 A2	Start	22,550,737 bp
Band	8|8 A2	End	22,561,643 bp
RNA expression pattern
Bgee	Human / Mouse (ortholog); Top expressed in: islet of Langerhans; Achilles tendon; endometrium; epithelium of colon; gonad; bone marrow cell; placenta; tonsil; corpus callosum; testicle / Top expressed in: spermatocyte; genital tubercle; hand; tail of embryo; supraoptic nucleus; seminal vesicula; superior cervical ganglion; medullary collecting duct; trigeminal ganglion; substantia nigra; More reference expression data
BioGPS	n/a
Gene ontology
Molecular function	transferase activity; glycosyltransferase activity; GDP-Man:Man3GlcNAc2-PP-Dol alpha-1,2-mannosyltransferase activity
Cellular component	integral component of membrane; endoplasmic reticulum; membrane; endoplasmic reticulum membrane
Biological process	mannosylation; oligosaccharide-lipid intermediate biosynthetic process; protein N-linked glycosylation
Sources:Amigo / QuickGO
Orthologs
Databases	NCBI: entry; OMA: entry
Species	Human	Mouse
Entrez	440138	207958
Ensembl	ENSG00000253710	ENSMUSG00000063362
UniProt	Q2TAA5	Q3TZM9
RefSeq (mRNA)	NM_001004127	NM_001243161; NM_183142
RefSeq (protein)	NP_001004127	NP_001230090; NP_898965
Location (UCSC)	Chr 13: 52.01 – 52.08 Mb	Chr 8: 22.55 – 22.56 Mb
PubMed search
- Wikidata
View/Edit Human	View/Edit Mouse

Asparagine-linked glycosylation protein 11 is an enzyme encoded by the ALG11 gene.

== See also ==
- Congenital disorder of glycosylation
