= ALG6 =

Protein-coding gene in humans

Identifiers
- Aliases: ALG6, CDG1C, alpha-1,3-glucosyltransferase, ALG6 alpha-1,3-glucosyltransferase
- External IDs: OMIM: 604566; MGI: 2444031; GeneCards: ALG6
Enzyme activity
| EC # | BRENDA | ExPASy | KEGG | MetaCyc |
|---|---|---|---|---|
| 2.4.1.267 | ↗ | ↗ | ↗ | ↗ |

Gene location (Human)
| Chr. | Chromosome 1 (human) |
| Band | 1p31.3 | Start | 63,367,575 bp |
| Band | 1p31.3 | End | 63,438,553 bp |

Gene location (Mouse)
| Chr. | Chromosome 4 (mouse) |
| Band | 4|4 C6 | Start | 99,603,901 bp |
| Band | 4|4 C6 | End | 99,651,697 bp |
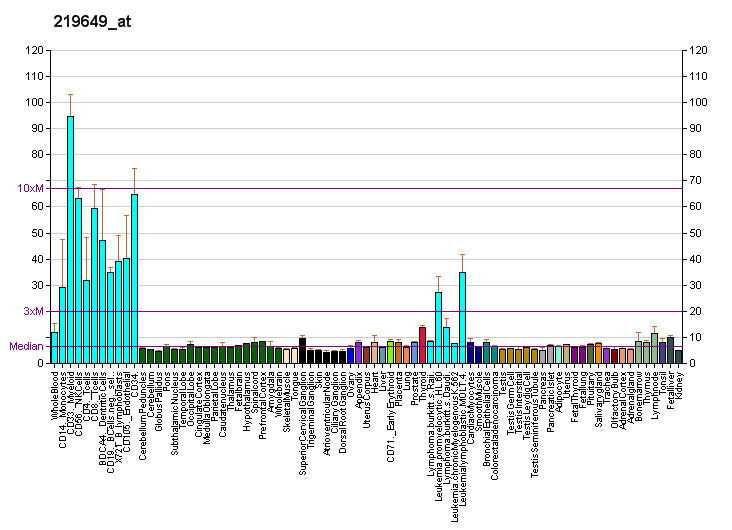
RNA expression pattern
| Bgee | Human / Mouse (ortholog); Top expressed in: secondary oocyte; gonad; skin of thigh; mononuclear cell; monocyte; testicle; mucosa of ileum; granulocyte; mucosa of transverse colon; rectum / Top expressed in: yolk sac; duodenum; tail of embryo; jejunum; hepatobiliary system; liver; ileum; epiblast; placenta; colon; More reference expression data |
| BioGPS | More reference expression data |
Gene ontology
| Molecular function | transferase activity; hexosyltransferase activity; glucosyltransferase activity; dolichyl pyrophosphate Man9GlcNAc2 alpha-1,3-glucosyltransferase activity; glycosyltransferase activity; dolichyl-phosphate-glucose-glycolipid alpha-glucosyltransferase activity |
| Cellular component | integral component of membrane; endoplasmic reticulum membrane; membrane; endoplasmic reticulum |
| Biological process | protein glycosylation; dolichol-linked oligosaccharide biosynthetic process; oligosaccharide-lipid intermediate biosynthetic process; protein N-linked glycosylation |
Sources:Amigo / QuickGO
Orthologs
| Databases | NCBI: entry; OMA: entry |
| Species | Human | Mouse |
| Entrez | 29929 | 320438 |
| Ensembl | ENSG00000088035 | ENSMUSG00000073792 |
| UniProt | Q9Y672 | Q3TAE8 |
| RefSeq (mRNA) | NM_013339 | NM_001081264 |
| RefSeq (protein) | NP_037471 | NP_001074733 |
| Location (UCSC) | Chr 1: 63.37 – 63.44 Mb | Chr 4: 99.6 – 99.65 Mb |
| PubMed search |
- Wikidata
| View/Edit Human | View/Edit Mouse |

Dolichyl pyrophosphate Man9GlcNAc2 alpha-1,3-glucosyltransferase is an enzyme that in humans is encoded by the ALG6 gene.

== Function ==
This gene encodes a member of the ALG6/ALG8 glucosyltransferase family. The encoded protein catalyzes the addition of the first glucose residue to the growing lipid-linked oligosaccharide precursor of N-linked glycosylation. Mutations in this gene are associated with congenital disorders of glycosylation type Ic.
