= RFT1 =

Protein-coding gene in the species Homo sapiens

Identifiers
- Aliases: RFT1, CDG1N, RFT1 homolog
- External IDs: OMIM: 611908; MGI: 3607791; GeneCards: RFT1

Gene location (Human)
| Chr. | Chromosome 3 (human) |
| Band | 3p21.1 | Start | 53,088,483 bp |
| Band | 3p21.1 | End | 53,130,453 bp |

Gene location (Mouse)
| Chr. | Chromosome 14 (mouse) |
| Band | 14|14 B | Start | 30,376,317 bp |
| Band | 14|14 B | End | 30,413,274 bp |
RNA expression pattern
| Bgee | Human / Mouse (ortholog); Top expressed in: gonad; body of pancreas; islet of Langerhans; stromal cell of endometrium; appendix; right adrenal gland; rectum; left adrenal gland; white blood cell; monocyte / Top expressed in: proximal tubule; spermatocyte; white adipose tissue; adrenal gland; hepatobiliary system; liver; right kidney; lens; placenta; ovary; More reference expression data |
| BioGPS | n/a |
Gene ontology
| Molecular function | lipid transporter activity |
| Cellular component | endoplasmic reticulum membrane; integral component of membrane; membrane |
| Biological process | carbohydrate transport; glycolipid translocation; lipid transport |
Sources:Amigo / QuickGO
Orthologs
| Databases | NCBI: entry; OMA: entry |
| Species | Human | Mouse |
| Entrez | 91869 | 328370 |
| Ensembl | ENSG00000163933 | ENSMUSG00000052395 |
| UniProt | Q96AA3 | Q8C3B8 |
| RefSeq (mRNA) | NM_052859 | NM_177815 |
| RefSeq (protein) | NP_443091 | NP_808483 |
| Location (UCSC) | Chr 3: 53.09 – 53.13 Mb | Chr 14: 30.38 – 30.41 Mb |
| PubMed search |
- Wikidata
| View/Edit Human | View/Edit Mouse |

Protein RFT1 homolog is a protein that in humans is encoded by the RFT1 gene.

Defects are associated with congenital disorder of glycosylation type 1N.

== See also ==
- Flippase
