= ALG3 =

Protein-coding gene in the species Homo sapiens

Identifiers
- Aliases: ALG3, CDG1D, CDGS4, D16Ertd36e, NOT56L, Not56, CDGS6, not, alpha-1,3- mannosyltransferase, ALG3 alpha-1,3- mannosyltransferase
- External IDs: OMIM: 608750; MGI: 1098592; GeneCards: ALG3
Enzyme activity
| EC # | BRENDA | ExPASy | KEGG | MetaCyc |
|---|---|---|---|---|
| 2.4.1.258 | ↗ | ↗ | ↗ | ↗ |

Gene location (Human)
| Chr. | Chromosome 3 (human) |
| Band | 3q27.1 | Start | 184,242,301 bp |
| Band | 3q27.1 | End | 184,249,548 bp |

Gene location (Mouse)
| Chr. | Chromosome 16 (mouse) |
| Band | 16 A3|16 12.48 cM | Start | 20,424,124 bp |
| Band | 16 A3|16 12.48 cM | End | 20,430,485 bp |
RNA expression pattern
| Bgee | Human / Mouse (ortholog); Top expressed in: mucosa of transverse colon; stromal cell of endometrium; right lobe of liver; right adrenal gland; body of pancreas; left adrenal gland; left adrenal cortex; right adrenal cortex; gonad; granulocyte / Top expressed in: otic placode; tail of embryo; otic vesicle; choroid plexus of fourth ventricle; genital tubercle; embryo; saccule; embryo; yolk sac; right kidney; More reference expression data |
| BioGPS | n/a |
Gene ontology
| Molecular function | glycosyltransferase activity; transferase activity; hexosyltransferase activity; dol-P-Man:Man(5)GlcNAc(2)-PP-Dol alpha-1,3-mannosyltransferase activity; alpha-1,3-mannosyltransferase activity; protein binding; mannosyltransferase activity |
| Cellular component | integral component of membrane; endoplasmic reticulum membrane; endoplasmic reticulum; membrane; integral component of endoplasmic reticulum membrane |
| Biological process | protein glycosylation; dolichol-linked oligosaccharide biosynthetic process; mannosylation |
Sources:Amigo / QuickGO
Orthologs
| Databases | NCBI: entry; OMA: entry |
| Species | Human | Mouse |
| Entrez | 10195 | 208624 |
| Ensembl | ENSG00000214160 | ENSMUSG00000033809 |
| UniProt | Q92685 | Q8K2A8 |
| RefSeq (mRNA) | NM_001006940; NM_001006941; NM_005787 | NM_145939; NM_001357403; NM_001357404; NM_001357405; NM_001357406 |
| RefSeq (protein) | NP_001006942; NP_005778 | NP_666051; NP_001344332; NP_001344333; NP_001344334; NP_001344335 |
| Location (UCSC) | Chr 3: 184.24 – 184.25 Mb | Chr 16: 20.42 – 20.43 Mb |
| PubMed search |
- Wikidata
| View/Edit Human | View/Edit Mouse |

Dolichyl-P-Man:Man(5)GlcNAc(2)-PP-dolichyl mannosyltransferase is an enzyme that, in humans, is encoded by the ALG3 gene.

This gene encodes a member of the ALG3 family. The encoded protein catalyses the addition of the first dol-P-Man derived mannose in an alpha 1,3 linkage to Man5GlcNAc2-PP-Dol. Defects in this gene have been associated with congenital disorder of glycosylation type Id (CDG-Id) characterized by abnormal N-glycosylation.
