= ALG8 =

Protein-coding gene in the species Homo sapiens

Identifiers
- Aliases: ALG8, CDG1H, alpha-1,3-glucosyltransferase, PCLD3, ALG8 alpha-1,3-glucosyltransferase
- External IDs: OMIM: 608103; MGI: 2141959; GeneCards: ALG8
Enzyme activity
EC #	BRENDA	ExPASy	KEGG	MetaCyc
2.4.1.265	↗	↗	↗	↗

Gene location (Human)
Chr.	Chromosome 11 (human)
Band	11q14.1	Start	78,095,244 bp
Band	11q14.1	End	78,139,660 bp

Gene location (Mouse)
Chr.	Chromosome 7 (mouse)
Band	7|7 E1	Start	97,020,813 bp
Band	7|7 E1	End	97,041,392 bp
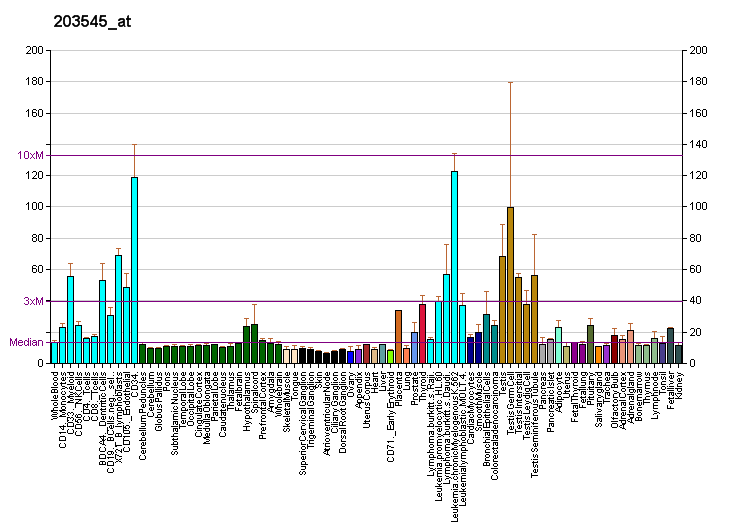
RNA expression pattern
Bgee	Human / Mouse (ortholog); Top expressed in: right testis; left testis; epithelium of colon; ventricular zone; testicle; right lobe of liver; right adrenal gland; left adrenal cortex; right adrenal cortex; stromal cell of endometrium / Top expressed in: tail of embryo; genital tubercle; spermatocyte; yolk sac; Paneth cell; otic vesicle; ventricular zone; endothelial cell of lymphatic vessel; zygote; spermatid; More reference expression data
BioGPS	More reference expression data
Gene ontology
Molecular function	glycosyltransferase activity; transferase activity; hexosyltransferase activity; alpha-1,3-mannosyltransferase activity; dolichyl pyrophosphate Man9GlcNAc2 alpha-1,3-glucosyltransferase activity; dolichyl-phosphate-glucose-glycolipid alpha-glucosyltransferase activity; protein binding; dolichyl pyrophosphate Glc1Man9GlcNAc2 alpha-1,3-glucosyltransferase activity
Cellular component	integral component of membrane; endoplasmic reticulum membrane; endoplasmic reticulum; membrane
Biological process	protein glycosylation; dolichol-linked oligosaccharide biosynthetic process; protein N-linked glycosylation; oligosaccharide-lipid intermediate biosynthetic process; mannosylation; protein N-linked glycosylation via asparagine
Sources:Amigo / QuickGO
Orthologs
Databases	NCBI: entry; OMA: entry
Species	Human	Mouse
Entrez	79053	381903
Ensembl	ENSG00000159063	ENSMUSG00000035704
UniProt	Q9BVK2	Q6P8H8
RefSeq (mRNA)	NM_001007027; NM_001007028; NM_024079	NM_199035
RefSeq (protein)	NP_001007028; NP_076984	NP_950200
Location (UCSC)	Chr 11: 78.1 – 78.14 Mb	Chr 7: 97.02 – 97.04 Mb
PubMed search
- Wikidata
View/Edit Human	View/Edit Mouse

Probable dolichyl pyrophosphate Glc1Man9GlcNAc2 alpha-1,3-glucosyltransferase is an enzyme encoded in humans by the ALG8 gene.

This gene encodes a member of the ALG6/ALG8 glucosyltransferase family. The encoded protein catalyzes the addition of the second glucose residue to the lipid-linked oligosaccharide precursor for N-linked glycosylation of proteins. Mutations in this gene are associated with congenital disorder of glycosylation type Ih (CDG-Ih). Alternatively spliced transcript variants encoding different isoforms have been identified.
