= ALG12 =

Enzyme-coding gene in humans

Identifiers
- Aliases: ALG12, CDG1G, ECM39, PP14673, halpha-1,6-mannosyltransferase, ALG12 alpha-1,6-mannosyltransferase
- External IDs: OMIM: 607144; MGI: 2385025; GeneCards: ALG12
Enzyme activity
EC #	BRENDA	ExPASy	KEGG	MetaCyc
2.4.1.260	↗	↗	↗	↗

Gene location (Human)
Chr.	Chromosome 22 (human)
Band	22q13.33	Start	49,900,229 bp
Band	22q13.33	End	49,918,438 bp

Gene location (Mouse)
Chr.	Chromosome 15 (mouse)
Band	15|15 E3	Start	88,689,447 bp
Band	15|15 E3	End	88,703,521 bp
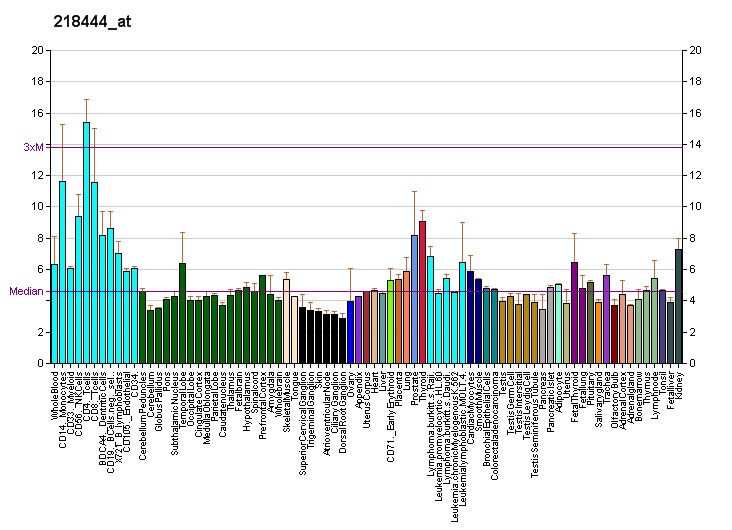
RNA expression pattern
Bgee	Human / Mouse (ortholog); Top expressed in: right lobe of thyroid gland; stromal cell of endometrium; left lobe of thyroid gland; apex of heart; body of stomach; right lobe of liver; mucosa of transverse colon; granulocyte; body of pancreas; testicle / Top expressed in: spermatid; zygote; yolk sac; granulocyte; right kidney; tail of embryo; lumbar spinal ganglion; spermatocyte; genital tubercle; islet of Langerhans; More reference expression data
BioGPS	More reference expression data
Gene ontology
Molecular function	dolichyl-P-Man:Man(7)GlcNAc(2)-PP-dolichol alpha-1,6-mannosyltransferase; transferase activity; alpha-1,6-mannosyltransferase activity; glycosyltransferase activity; mannosyltransferase activity
Cellular component	integral component of membrane; endoplasmic reticulum membrane; membrane; endoplasmic reticulum; endoplasmic reticulum lumen
Biological process	protein glycosylation; dolichol-linked oligosaccharide biosynthetic process; protein folding; mannosylation; protein N-linked glycosylation
Sources:Amigo / QuickGO
Orthologs
Databases	NCBI: entry; OMA: entry
Species	Human	Mouse
Entrez	79087	223774
Ensembl	ENSG00000182858	ENSMUSG00000035845
UniProt	Q9BV10	Q8VDB2
RefSeq (mRNA)	NM_024105	NM_001142357; NM_145477
RefSeq (protein)	NP_077010	NP_001135829; NP_663452
Location (UCSC)	Chr 22: 49.9 – 49.92 Mb	Chr 15: 88.69 – 88.7 Mb
PubMed search
- Wikidata
View/Edit Human	View/Edit Mouse

Dolichyl-P-Man:Man(7)GlcNAc(2)-PP-dolichyl-alpha-1,6-mannosyltransferase is an enzyme that in humans is encoded by the ALG12 gene.

This gene encodes a member of the glycosyltransferase 22 family. The encoded protein catalyzes the addition of the eighth mannose residue in an alpha-1,6 linkage onto the dolichol-PP-oligosaccharide precursor (dolichol-PP-Man(7)GlcNAc(2)) required for protein glycosylation. Mutations in this gene have been associated with congenital disorder of glycosylation type Ig (CDG-Ig) characterized by abnormal N-glycosylation.
