= DDOST =

Protein-coding gene in humans

Identifiers
- Aliases: DDOST, AGER1, CDG1R, OKSWcl45, OST, OST48, WBP1, dolichyl-diphosphooligosaccharide--protein glycosyltransferase non-catalytic subunit, GATD6
- External IDs: OMIM: 602202; MGI: 1194508; GeneCards: DDOST

Gene location (Human)
Chr.	Chromosome 1 (human)
Band	1p36.12	Start	20,651,767 bp
Band	1p36.12	End	20,661,544 bp

Gene location (Mouse)
Chr.	Chromosome 4 (mouse)
Band	4|4 D3	Start	138,032,041 bp
Band	4|4 D3	End	138,039,939 bp
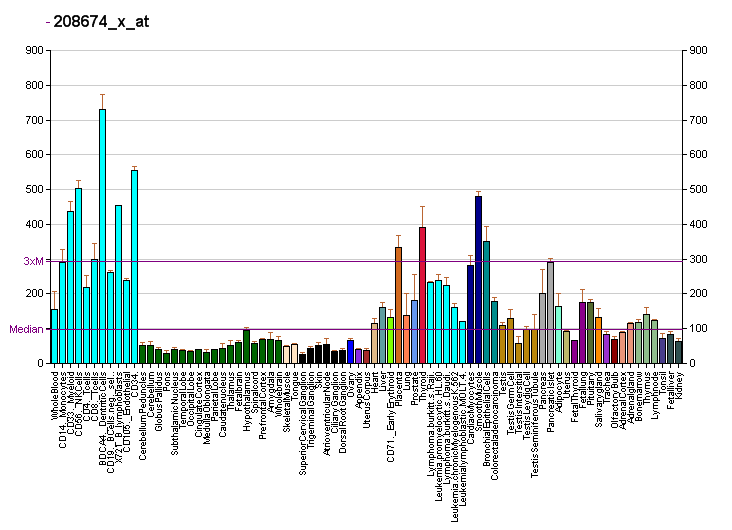

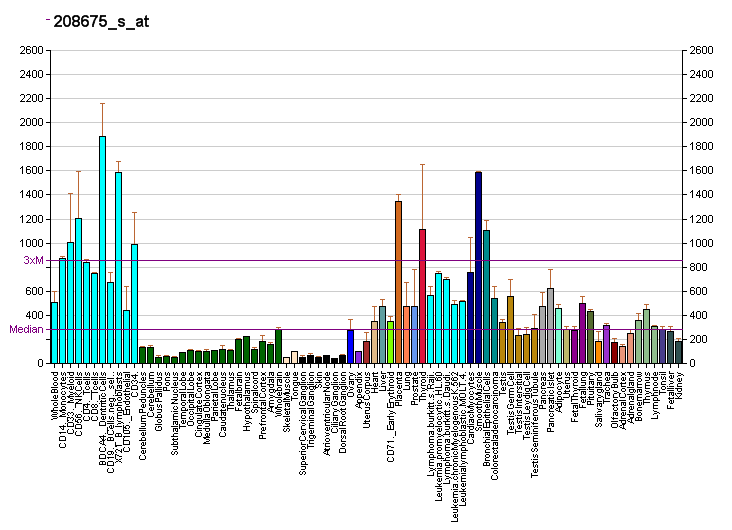
RNA expression pattern
Bgee	Human / Mouse (ortholog); Top expressed in: corpus epididymis; stromal cell of endometrium; body of pancreas; caput epididymis; islet of Langerhans; rectum; smooth muscle tissue; placenta; beta cell; spleen / Top expressed in: parotid gland; lacrimal gland; seminal vesicula; gastrula; dermis; islet of Langerhans; molar; stroma of bone marrow; vestibular sensory epithelium; crypt of lieberkuhn of small intestine; More reference expression data
BioGPS	More reference expression data
Gene ontology
Molecular function	dolichyl-diphosphooligosaccharide-protein glycotransferase activity; protein binding; oligosaccharyl transferase activity
Cellular component	integral component of membrane; endoplasmic reticulum membrane; membrane; intracellular membrane-bounded organelle; endoplasmic reticulum; oligosaccharyltransferase complex; plasma membrane; azurophil granule membrane; protein-containing complex
Biological process	response to cytokine; protein N-linked glycosylation via asparagine; protein glycosylation; protein N-linked glycosylation; T cell activation; neutrophil degranulation
Sources:Amigo / QuickGO
Orthologs
Databases	NCBI: entry; OMA: entry
Species	Human	Mouse
Entrez	1650	13200
Ensembl	ENSG00000244038	ENSMUSG00000028757
UniProt	P39656	O54734
RefSeq (mRNA)	NM_005216	NM_007838
RefSeq (protein)	NP_005207	NP_031864
Location (UCSC)	Chr 1: 20.65 – 20.66 Mb	Chr 4: 138.03 – 138.04 Mb
PubMed search
- Wikidata
View/Edit Human	View/Edit Mouse

Dolichyl-diphosphooligosaccharide—protein glycosyltransferase 48 kDa subunit is an enzyme that in humans is encoded by the DDOST gene.

This gene encodes a component of the oligosaccharyltransferase complex which catalyzes the transfer of high-mannose oligosaccharides to asparagine residues on nascent polypeptides in the lumen of the rough endoplasmic reticulum. The protein complex co-purifies with ribosomes. The product of this gene is also implicated in the processing of advanced glycation endproducts (AGEs), which form from non-enzymatic reactions between sugars and proteins or lipids and are associated with aging and hyperglycemia.
