= GCS1 =

Protein-coding gene in the species Homo sapiens

MOGS

Identifiers
- Aliases: MOGS, CDG2B, CWH41, DER7, GCS1, mannosyl-oligosaccharide glucosidase
- External IDs: OMIM: 601336; MGI: 1929872; GeneCards: MOGS
Enzyme activity
EC #	BRENDA	ExPASy	KEGG	MetaCyc
3.2.1.106	↗	↗	↗	↗

Gene location (Mouse)
Chr.	Chromosome 6 (mouse)
Band	6|6 C3	Start	83,092,477 bp
Band	6|6 C3	End	83,095,879 bp
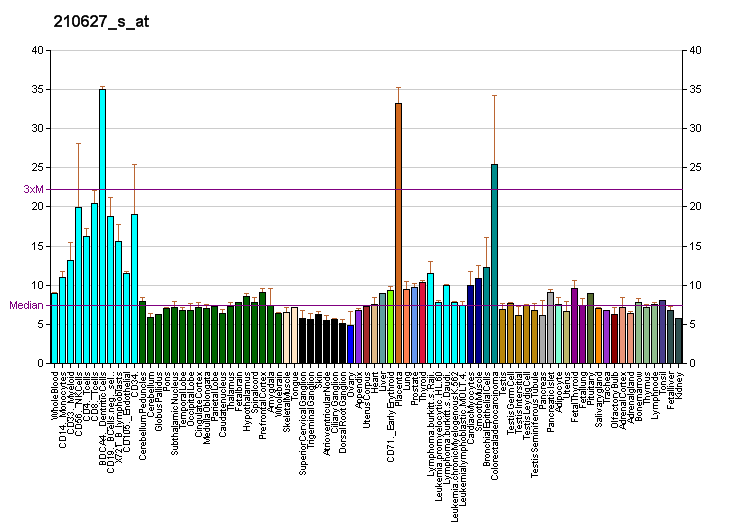
RNA expression pattern
Bgee	Human / Mouse (ortholog); Top expressed in: body of pancreas; body of stomach; stromal cell of endometrium; right uterine tube; right lobe of thyroid gland; minor salivary glands; right lobe of liver; left lobe of thyroid gland; anterior pituitary; upper lobe of left lung / Top expressed in: primitive streak; Paneth cell; condyle; cumulus cell; somite; fossa; fetal liver hematopoietic progenitor cell; lacrimal gland; epiblast; abdominal wall; More reference expression data
BioGPS	More reference expression data
Gene ontology
Molecular function	glucosidase activity; catalytic activity; hydrolase activity; hydrolase activity, acting on glycosyl bonds; Glc3Man9GlcNAc2 oligosaccharide glucosidase activity
Cellular component	integral component of membrane; extracellular exosome; membrane; endoplasmic reticulum; endoplasmic reticulum membrane
Biological process	metabolism; protein N-linked glycosylation; protein folding; oligosaccharide metabolic process
Sources:Amigo / QuickGO
Orthologs
Databases	NCBI: entry
Species	Human	Mouse
Entrez	7841	57377
Ensembl	n/a	ENSMUSG00000030036
UniProt	Q13724	Q80UM7
RefSeq (mRNA)	NM_006302; NM_001146158	NM_020619
RefSeq (protein)	NP_001139630; NP_006293	NP_065644
Location (UCSC)	n/a	Chr 6: 83.09 – 83.1 Mb
PubMed search
- Wikidata
View/Edit Human	View/Edit Mouse

Mannosyl-oligosaccharide glucosidase is an enzyme that in humans is encoded by the MOGS gene.

Glucosidase I is the first enzyme in the N-linked oligosaccharide processing pathway. GCS1 cleaves the distal alpha-1,2-linked glucose residue from the Glc(3)-Man(9)-GlcNAc(2) oligosaccharide precursor. GCS1 is located in the lumen of the endoplasmic reticulum.

GCS1 may also refer to "generative cell specific 1", also called HAP2 (hapless2), a gene of lower eukaryotes which is thought to be responsible for gametes fusion . .
