= MAN1B1 =

Protein-coding gene in the species Homo sapiens

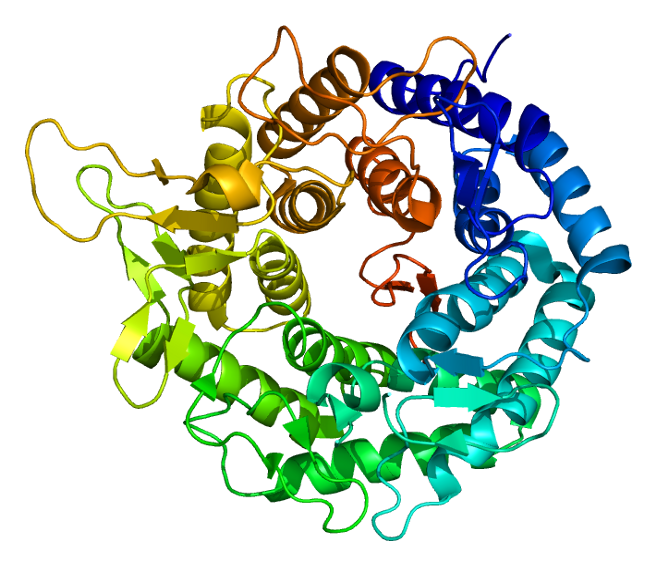

Identifiers
- Aliases: MAN1B1, ERMAN1, MANA-ER, MRT15, ERManI, mannosidase alpha class 1B member 1
- External IDs: OMIM: 604346; MGI: 2684954; GeneCards: MAN1B1
Available structures
PDB	Ortholog search: PDBe RCSB
PDB	List of PDB id codes 1FMI, 1FO2, 1FO3, 1X9D
Enzyme activity
EC #	BRENDA	ExPASy	KEGG	MetaCyc
3.2.1.113	↗	↗	↗	↗

Gene location (Human)
Chr.	Chromosome 9 (human)
Band	9q34.3	Start	137,086,857 bp
Band	9q34.3	End	137,109,189 bp

Gene location (Mouse)
Chr.	Chromosome 2 (mouse)
Band	2|2 A3	Start	25,222,350 bp
Band	2|2 A3	End	25,242,224 bp
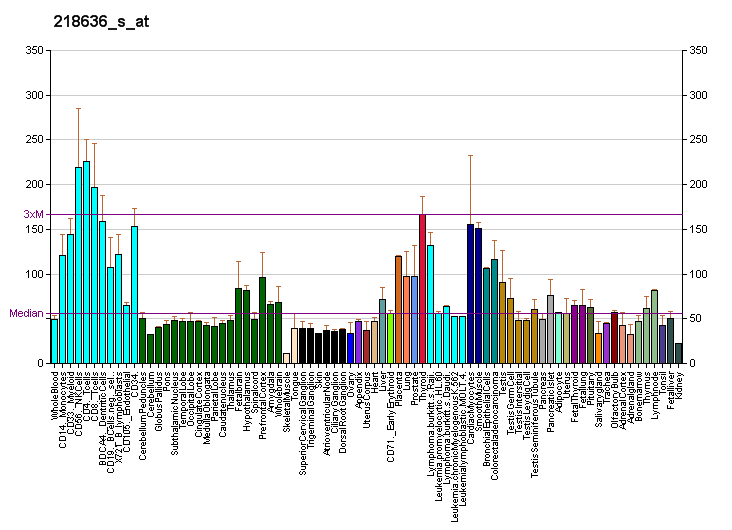

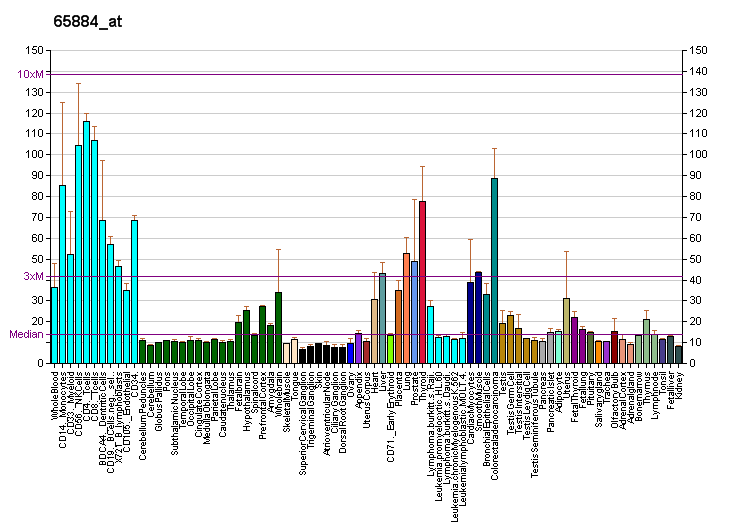
RNA expression pattern
Bgee	Human / Mouse (ortholog); Top expressed in: stromal cell of endometrium; right uterine tube; skin of leg; anterior pituitary; apex of heart; skin of abdomen; right hemisphere of cerebellum; minor salivary glands; olfactory zone of nasal mucosa; right lobe of thyroid gland / Top expressed in: spermatocyte; Ileal epithelium; spermatid; neural layer of retina; yolk sac; corneal stroma; granulocyte; ventricular zone; dentate gyrus of hippocampal formation granule cell; superior frontal gyrus; More reference expression data
BioGPS	More reference expression data
Gene ontology
Molecular function	metal ion binding; calcium ion binding; hydrolase activity, acting on glycosyl bonds; hydrolase activity; mannosyl-oligosaccharide 1,2-alpha-mannosidase activity; catalytic activity
Cellular component	extracellular vesicle; integral component of membrane; Golgi apparatus; membrane; endoplasmic reticulum membrane; endoplasmic reticulum; endoplasmic reticulum quality control compartment; Golgi membrane
Biological process	oligosaccharide metabolic process; metabolism; N-glycan processing; mannose trimming involved in glycoprotein ERAD pathway; protein alpha-1,2-demannosylation; protein glycosylation; ubiquitin-dependent ERAD pathway; trimming of terminal mannose on B branch; trimming of terminal mannose on C branch; trimming of first mannose on A branch; trimming of second mannose on A branch; endoplasmic reticulum mannose trimming
Sources:Amigo / QuickGO
Orthologs
Databases	NCBI: entry; OMA: entry
Species	Human	Mouse
Entrez	11253	227619
Ensembl	ENSG00000177239	ENSMUSG00000036646
UniProt	Q9UKM7	A2AJ15
RefSeq (mRNA)	NM_016219	NM_001029983
RefSeq (protein)	NP_057303	NP_001025154
Location (UCSC)	Chr 9: 137.09 – 137.11 Mb	Chr 2: 25.22 – 25.24 Mb
PubMed search
- Wikidata
View/Edit Human	View/Edit Mouse

Endoplasmic reticulum mannosyl-oligosaccharide 1,2-alpha-mannosidase is an enzyme that in humans is encoded by the MAN1B1 gene.
