= B4GALT1 =

Protein-coding gene in the species Homo sapiens

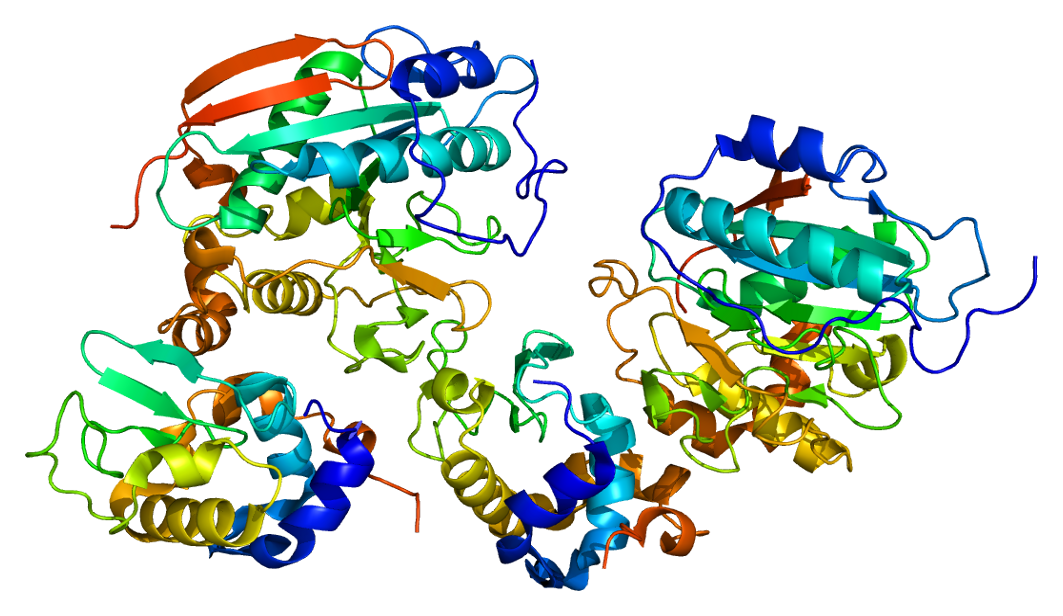

Identifiers
- Aliases: B4GALT1, B4GAL-T1, CDG2D, GGTB2, GT1, GTB, beta4Gal-T1, beta-1,4-galactosyltransferase 1
- External IDs: OMIM: 137060; MGI: 95705; GeneCards: B4GALT1
Available structures
PDB	Ortholog search: PDBe RCSB
PDB	List of PDB id codes 2AE7, 2AEC, 2AES, 2AGD, 2AH9, 2FY7, 2FYA, 2FYB, 3EE5, 4EE3, 4EE4, 4EE5, 4EEA, 4EEG, 4EEM, 4EEO, 4L41
Enzyme activity
EC #	BRENDA	ExPASy	KEGG	MetaCyc
2.4.1.22	↗	↗	↗	↗
2.4.1.38	↗	↗	↗	↗
2.4.1.90	↗	↗	↗	↗
2.4.1.275	↗	↗	↗	↗

Gene location (Human)
Chr.	Chromosome 9 (human)
Band	9p21.1	Start	33,104,082 bp
Band	9p21.1	End	33,167,356 bp

Gene location (Mouse)
Chr.	Chromosome 4 (mouse)
Band	4 A5|4 20.46 cM	Start	40,804,602 bp
Band	4 A5|4 20.46 cM	End	40,854,005 bp
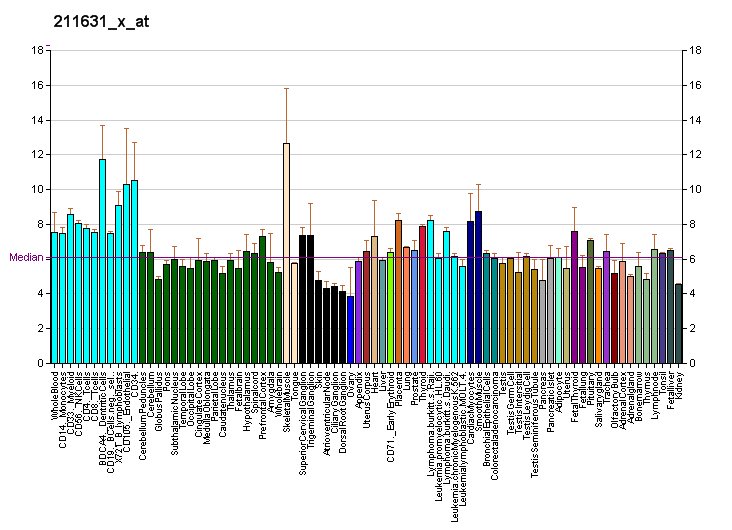

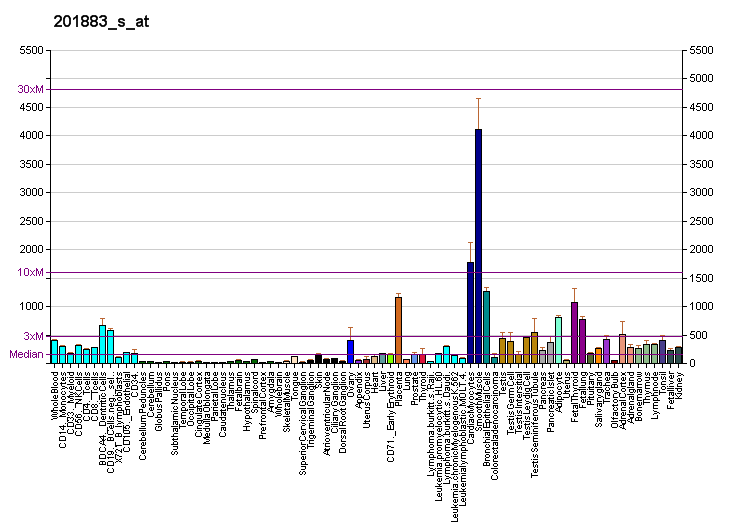

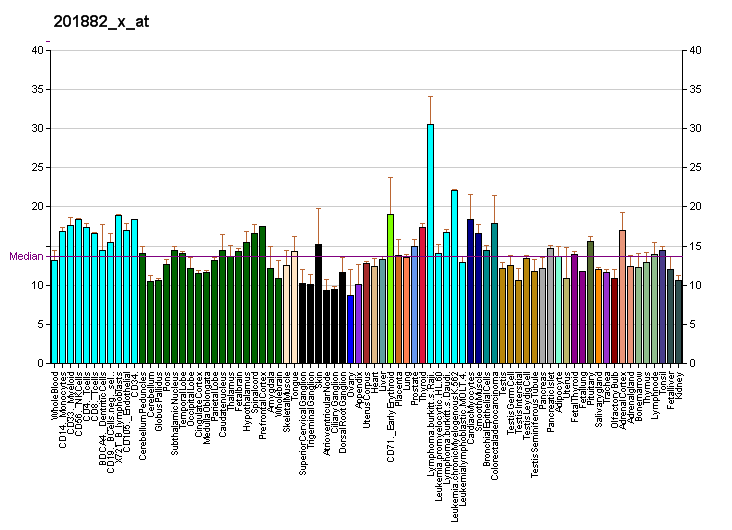
RNA expression pattern
Bgee	Human / Mouse (ortholog); Top expressed in: buccal mucosa cell; stromal cell of endometrium; left uterine tube; minor salivary glands; mucosa of ileum; gallbladder; right ovary; olfactory zone of nasal mucosa; smooth muscle tissue; mucosa of transverse colon / Top expressed in: lacrimal gland; pyloric antrum; gastrula; mucous cell of stomach; cumulus cell; tibiofemoral joint; lactiferous gland; crypt of lieberkuhn of small intestine; choroid plexus of fourth ventricle; granulocyte; More reference expression data
BioGPS	More reference expression data
Gene ontology
Molecular function	protein homodimerization activity; cytoskeletal protein binding; alpha-tubulin binding; glycosyltransferase activity; lactose synthase activity; transferase activity; beta-tubulin binding; UDP-galactosyltransferase activity; metal ion binding; manganese ion binding; N-acetyllactosamine synthase activity; galactosyltransferase activity; beta-N-acetylglucosaminylglycopeptide beta-1,4-galactosyltransferase activity
Cellular component	Golgi cisterna membrane; Golgi membrane; desmosome; extracellular region; filopodium; brush border membrane; Golgi trans cisterna; integral component of membrane; cell projection; cell surface; external side of plasma membrane; extracellular exosome; basolateral plasma membrane; plasma membrane; Golgi apparatus; membrane; extracellular space; secretory granule membrane; azurophil granule membrane
Biological process	regulation of acrosome reaction; glycoprotein biosynthetic process; epithelial cell development; penetration of zona pellucida; cell adhesion; lactose biosynthetic process; extracellular matrix organization; positive regulation of apoptotic process involved in mammary gland involution; positive regulation of epithelial cell proliferation involved in wound healing; angiogenesis involved in wound healing; leukocyte migration; wound healing; binding of sperm to zona pellucida; protein glycosylation; acute inflammatory response; branching morphogenesis of an epithelial tube; negative regulation of cell population proliferation; galactose metabolic process; development of secondary sexual characteristics; keratan sulfate biosynthetic process; mammary gland development; regulation of cell population proliferation; positive regulation of apoptotic process; protein N-linked glycosylation; oligosaccharide biosynthetic process; neutrophil degranulation; protein homooligomerization; carbohydrate metabolic process
Sources:Amigo / QuickGO
Orthologs
Databases	NCBI: entry; OMA: entry
Species	Human	Mouse
Entrez	2683	14595
Ensembl	ENSG00000086062	ENSMUSG00000028413
UniProt	P15291; Q86XA6	P15535
RefSeq (mRNA)	NM_001497	NM_022305; NM_001378519
RefSeq (protein)	NP_001488; NP_001365424; NP_001365425; NP_001365426	NP_071641; NP_001365448
Location (UCSC)	Chr 9: 33.1 – 33.17 Mb	Chr 4: 40.8 – 40.85 Mb
PubMed search
- Wikidata
View/Edit Human	View/Edit Mouse

Beta-1,4-galactosyltransferase 1 is an enzyme that in humans is encoded by the B4GALT1 gene.

This gene is one of seven beta-1,4-galactosyltransferase (beta4GalT) genes. They encode type II membrane-bound glycoproteins that appear to have exclusive specificity for the donor substrate UDP-galactose; all transfer galactose in a beta1,4 linkage to similar acceptor sugars: GlcNAc, Glc, and Xyl. Each beta4GalT has a distinct function in the biosynthesis of different glycoconjugates and saccharide structures. As type II membrane proteins, they have an N-terminal hydrophobic signal sequence that directs the protein to the Golgi apparatus and which then remains uncleaved to function as a transmembrane anchor. By sequence similarity, the beta4GalTs form four groups: beta4GalT1 and beta4GalT2, beta4GalT3 and beta4GalT4, beta4GalT5 and beta4GalT6, and beta4GalT7. This gene is unique among the beta4GalT genes because it encodes an enzyme that participates both in glycoconjugate and lactose biosynthesis. For the first activity, the enzyme adds galactose to N-acetylglucosamine residues that are either monosaccharides or the nonreducing ends of glycoprotein carbohydrate chains. The second activity is restricted to lactating mammary tissues where the enzyme forms a heterodimer with alpha-lactalbumin to catalyze UDP-galactose + D-glucose <=> UDP + lactose. The two enzymatic forms result from alternate transcription initiation sites and post-translational processing. Two transcripts, which differ only at the 5' end, with approximate lengths of 4.1 kb and 3.9 kb encode the same protein. The longer transcript encodes the type II membrane-bound, trans-Golgi resident protein involved in glycoconjugate biosynthesis. The shorter transcript encodes a protein which is cleaved to form the soluble lactose synthase.
