= COG8 =

Protein-coding gene in the species Homo sapiens

Identifiers
- Aliases: COG8, CDG2H, DOR1, component of oligomeric golgi complex 8
- External IDs: OMIM: 606979; MGI: 2142885; GeneCards: COG8

Gene location (Human)
Chr.	Chromosome 16 (human)
Band	16q22.1	Start	69,320,140 bp
Band	16q22.1	End	69,339,667 bp

Gene location (Mouse)
Chr.	Chromosome 8 (mouse)
Band	8|8 D3	Start	107,772,921 bp
Band	8|8 D3	End	107,783,321 bp
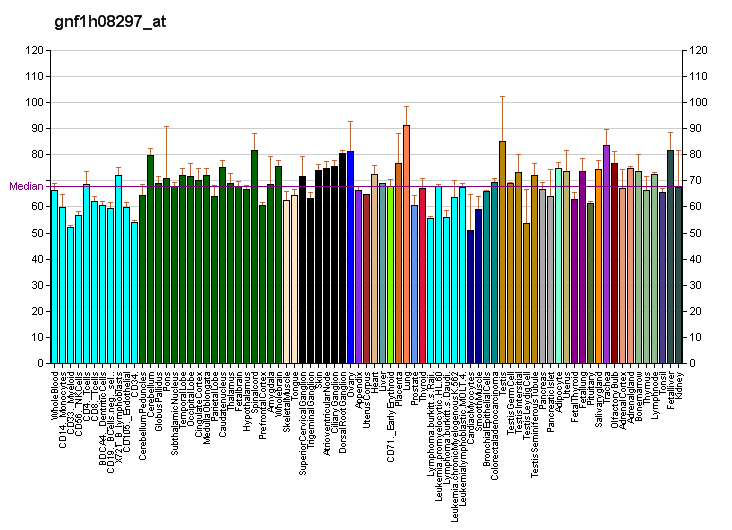
RNA expression pattern
Bgee	Human / Mouse (ortholog); Top expressed in: skin of arm; tibialis anterior muscle; stromal cell of endometrium; gastrocnemius muscle; mucosa of ileum; right adrenal gland; cerebellar vermis; right adrenal cortex; muscle of thigh; left adrenal gland / Top expressed in: otic vesicle; saccule; seminiferous tubule; otic placode; spermatid; spermatocyte; muscle of thigh; granulocyte; interventricular septum; right kidney; More reference expression data
BioGPS	More reference expression data
Gene ontology
Molecular function	protein binding
Cellular component	membrane; Golgi transport complex; trans-Golgi network membrane; Golgi membrane; Golgi apparatus
Biological process	protein transport; endoplasmic reticulum to Golgi vesicle-mediated transport; intra-Golgi vesicle-mediated transport; transport
Sources:Amigo / QuickGO
Orthologs
Databases	NCBI: entry; OMA: entry
Species	Human	Mouse
Entrez	84342	97484
Ensembl	ENSG00000213380	ENSMUSG00000031916
UniProt	Q96MW5	Q9JJA2
RefSeq (mRNA)	NM_032382; NM_001374871	NM_139229
RefSeq (protein)	NP_115758	NP_631975
Location (UCSC)	Chr 16: 69.32 – 69.34 Mb	Chr 8: 107.77 – 107.78 Mb
PubMed search
- Wikidata
View/Edit Human	View/Edit Mouse

Conserved oligomeric Golgi complex subunit 8 is a protein that in humans is encoded by the COG8 gene.

Multiprotein complexes are key determinants of Golgi apparatus structure and its capacity for intracellular transport and glycoprotein modification. Several complexes have been identified, including the Golgi transport complex (GTC), the LDLC complex, which is involved in glycosylation reactions, and the SEC34 complex, which is involved in vesicular transport. These 3 complexes are identical and have been termed the conserved oligomeric Golgi complex (COG), which includes COG8 (Ungar et al., 2002).[supplied by OMIM]
