= DPM1 =

Protein-coding gene in the species Homo sapiens

Identifiers
- Aliases: DPM1, CDGIE, MPDS, dolichyl-phosphate mannosyltransferase polypeptide 1, catalytic subunit, dolichyl-phosphate mannosyltransferase subunit 1, catalytic
- External IDs: OMIM: 603503; MGI: 1330239; GeneCards: DPM1
Enzyme activity
EC #	BRENDA	ExPASy	KEGG	MetaCyc
2.4.1.83	↗	↗	↗	↗

Gene location (Human)
Chr.	Chromosome 20 (human)
Band	20q13.13	Start	50,934,867 bp
Band	20q13.13	End	50,959,140 bp

Gene location (Mouse)
Chr.	Chromosome 2 (mouse)
Band	2|2 H3	Start	168,050,968 bp
Band	2|2 H3	End	168,072,511 bp
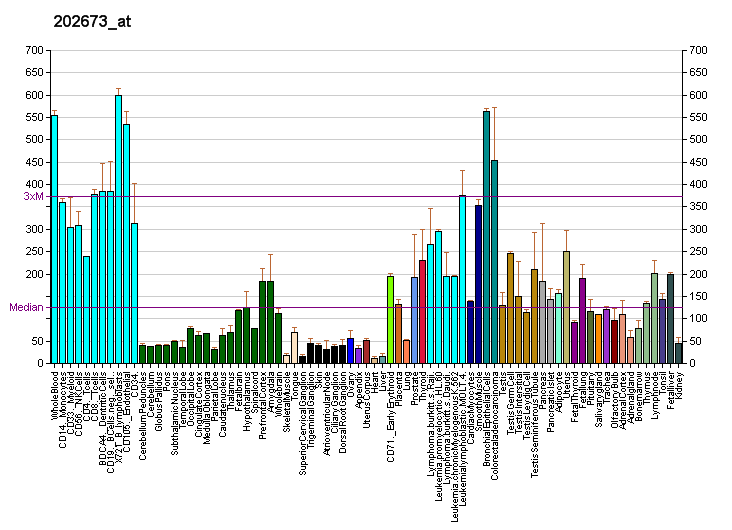
RNA expression pattern
Bgee	Human / Mouse (ortholog); Top expressed in: epithelium of nasopharynx; germinal epithelium; sperm; Skeletal muscle tissue of biceps brachii; oral cavity; skin of hip; gums; gingival epithelium; amniotic fluid; mucosa of pharynx / Top expressed in: spermatocyte; spermatid; yolk sac; morula; blastocyst; right kidney; muscle of thigh; neural layer of retina; embryo; lip; More reference expression data
BioGPS	More reference expression data
Gene ontology
Molecular function	transferase activity; glycosyltransferase activity; dolichyl-phosphate beta-D-mannosyltransferase activity; protein binding; dolichyl-phosphate-mannose-protein mannosyltransferase activity
Cellular component	endoplasmic reticulum membrane; membrane; endoplasmic reticulum; dolichol-phosphate-mannose synthase complex; nucleus
Biological process	protein O-linked mannosylation; protein N-linked glycosylation via asparagine; protein glycosylation; GPI anchor biosynthetic process; protein mannosylation; dolichol metabolic process
Sources:Amigo / QuickGO
Orthologs
Databases	NCBI: entry; OMA: entry
Species	Human	Mouse
Entrez	8813	13480
Ensembl	ENSG00000000419	ENSMUSG00000078919
UniProt	O60762	O70152
RefSeq (mRNA)	NM_003859; NM_001317034; NM_001317035; NM_001317036	NM_010072; NM_001310084
RefSeq (protein)	NP_001303963; NP_001303964; NP_001303965; NP_003850	NP_001297013; NP_034202
Location (UCSC)	Chr 20: 50.93 – 50.96 Mb	Chr 2: 168.05 – 168.07 Mb
PubMed search
- Wikidata
View/Edit Human	View/Edit Mouse

Dolichol-phosphate mannosyltransferase is an enzyme that in humans is encoded by the DPM1 gene.

== Function ==
Dolichol-phosphate mannose (Dol-P-Man) serves as a donor of mannosyl residues on the lumenal side of the endoplasmic reticulum (ER). Lack of Dol-P-Man results in defective surface expression of GPI-anchored proteins. Dol-P-Man is synthesized from GDP-mannose and dolichol-phosphate on the cytosolic side of the ER by the enzyme dolichyl-phosphate mannosyltransferase. Human DPM1 lacks a carboxy-terminal transmembrane domain and signal sequence and is regulated by DPM2.
