= Dolichyl-phosphate beta-D-mannosyltransferase =

Class of enzymes

dolichyl-phosphate beta-D-mannosyltransferase

Identifiers
- EC no.: 2.4.1.83
- CAS no.: 62213-44-9

Databases
- BRENDA: enzyme data
- ExPASy: NiceZyme view
- KEGG: enzyme entry
- MetaCyc: metabolic pathway
- Rhea: reactions
- PDB structures: RCSB PDB PDBe PDBsum
- Gene Ontology: AmiGO / QuickGO
Search
- PMC: articles
- PubMed: articles
- NCBI: proteins

In enzymology, a dolichyl-phosphate beta-D-mannosyltransferase (EC 2.4.1.83) is an enzyme that catalyzes the chemical reaction

GDP-mannose + dolichyl phosphate $\rightleftharpoons$ GDP + dolichyl D-mannosyl phosphate

Thus, the two substrates of this enzyme are GDP-mannose and dolichyl phosphate, whereas its two products are GDP and dolichyl D-mannosyl phosphate.

This enzyme belongs to the family of glycosyltransferases, specifically the hexosyltransferases. The systematic name of this enzyme class is GDP-mannose:dolichyl-phosphate beta-D-mannosyltransferase. Other names in common use include GDP-Man:DolP mannosyltransferase, dolichyl mannosyl phosphate synthase, dolichyl-phospho-mannose synthase, GDP-mannose:dolichyl-phosphate mannosyltransferase, guanosine diphosphomannose-dolichol phosphate mannosyltransferase, dolichol phosphate mannose synthase, dolichyl phosphate mannosyltransferase, dolichyl-phosphate mannose synthase, GDP-mannose-dolichol phosphate mannosyltransferase, GDP-mannose-dolichylmonophosphate mannosyltransferase, mannosylphosphodolichol synthase, and mannosylphosphoryldolichol synthase. This enzyme participates in n-glycan biosynthesis.
