= MGAT2 =

Protein-coding gene in the species Homo sapiens

Identifiers
- Aliases: MGAT2, CDG2A, CDGS2, GLCNACTII, GNT-II, GNT2, mannosyl (alpha-1,6-)-glycoprotein beta-1,2-N-acetylglucosaminyltransferase, alpha-1,6-mannosyl-glycoprotein 2-beta-N-acetylglucosaminyltransferase
- External IDs: OMIM: 602616; MGI: 2384966; GeneCards: MGAT2
Enzyme activity
EC #	BRENDA	ExPASy	KEGG	MetaCyc
2.4.1.143	↗	↗	↗	↗

Gene location (Human)
Chr.	Chromosome 14 (human)
Band	14q21.3	Start	49,620,799 bp
Band	14q21.3	End	49,623,481 bp

Gene location (Mouse)
Chr.	Chromosome 12 (mouse)
Band	12|12 C2	Start	69,230,931 bp
Band	12|12 C2	End	69,233,544 bp
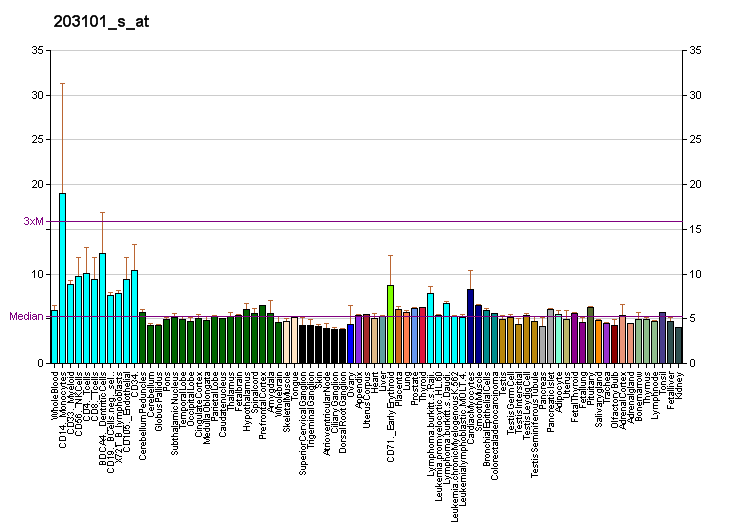

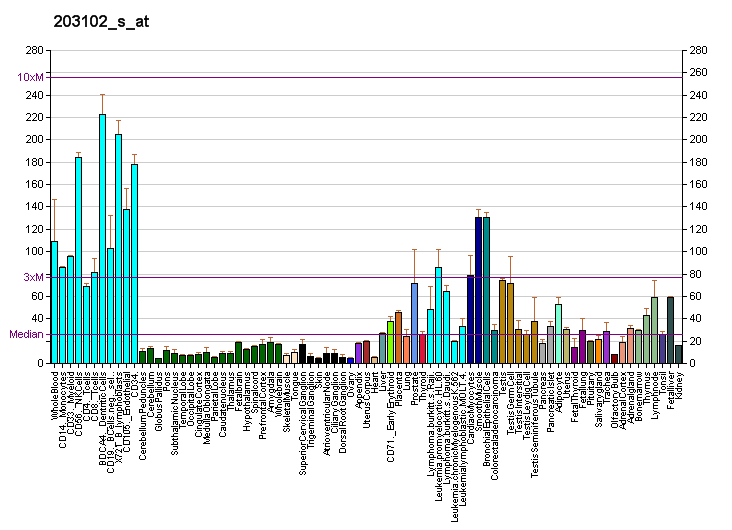

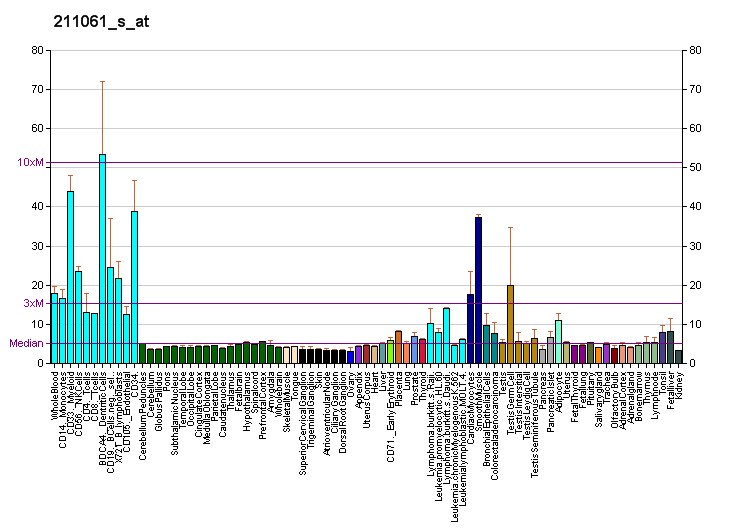
RNA expression pattern
Bgee	Human / Mouse (ortholog); Top expressed in: jejunal mucosa; mucosa of sigmoid colon; decidua; periodontal fiber; corpus epididymis; caput epididymis; bronchial epithelial cell; tail of epididymis; seminal vesicula; skin of hip / Top expressed in: parotid gland; seminal vesicula; epithelium of stomach; decidua; calvaria; right kidney; gastrula; medullary collecting duct; transitional epithelium of urinary bladder; pyloric antrum; More reference expression data
BioGPS	More reference expression data
Gene ontology
Molecular function	transferase activity; alpha-1,6-mannosylglycoprotein 2-beta-N-acetylglucosaminyltransferase activity; carbohydrate binding; glycosyltransferase activity; manganese ion binding; protein homodimerization activity; metal ion binding
Cellular component	integral component of membrane; Golgi membrane; Golgi stack; Golgi apparatus; membrane
Biological process	protein glycosylation; oligosaccharide biosynthetic process; protein N-linked glycosylation; oligosaccharide metabolic process; protein N-linked glycosylation via asparagine
Sources:Amigo / QuickGO
Orthologs
Databases	NCBI: entry; OMA: entry
Species	Human	Mouse
Entrez	4247	217664
Ensembl	ENSG00000168282	ENSMUSG00000043998
UniProt	Q10469	Q921V5
RefSeq (mRNA)	NM_002408; NM_001015883	NM_146035
RefSeq (protein)	NP_002399	NP_666147
Location (UCSC)	Chr 14: 49.62 – 49.62 Mb	Chr 12: 69.23 – 69.23 Mb
PubMed search
- Wikidata
View/Edit Human	View/Edit Mouse

Alpha-1,6-mannosyl-glycoprotein 2-beta-N-acetylglucosaminyltransferase is an enzyme that in humans is encoded by the MGAT2 gene.

The product of this gene is a Golgi enzyme catalyzing an essential step in the conversion of oligomannose to complex N-glycans. The enzyme has the typical glycosyltransferase domains: a short N-terminal cytoplasmic domain, a hydrophobic non-cleavable signal-anchor domain, and a C-terminal catalytic domain. Mutations in this gene may lead to carbohydrate-deficient glycoprotein syndrome, type II. The coding region of this gene is intronless. Transcript variants with a spliced 5' UTR may exist, but their biological validity has not been determined.
