= Mannose 1-phosphate =

Names
- IUPAC name 1-O-Phosphono-D-mannopyranose
- Systematic IUPAC name [(3S,4S,5S,6R)-3,4,5-Trihydroxy-6-(hydroxymethyl)oxan-2-yl] dihydrogen phosphate
- Other names Mannose-1-P; D-mannose-1-phosphate; D-Mannopyranose-1-phosphate

Identifiers
CAS Number	27251-84-9
3D model (JSmol)	Interactive image
ChEBI	CHEBI:35374
ChemSpider	559210 Unspecified anomer; 388412 alpha anomer; 2496902 beta anomer
PubChem CID	644175
CompTox Dashboard (EPA)	DTXSID60949986
- InChI: InChI=1S/C6H13O9P/c7-1-2-3(8)4(9)5(10)6(14-2)15-16(11,12)13/h2-10H,1H2,(H2,11,12,13)/t2-,3-,4+,5+,6?/m1/s1 Key: HXXFSFRBOHSIMQ-QTVWNMPRSA-N
- SMILES: O=P(O)(OC1O[C@@H]([C@@H](O)[C@H](O)[C@@H]1O)CO)O

Properties
Chemical formula	C_{6}H_{13}O_{9}P
Molar mass	260.135 g·mol^{−1}
- Except where otherwise noted, data are given for materials in their standard state (at 25 °C [77 °F], 100 kPa). verify (what is ?) Infobox references

Mannose 1-phosphate is a molecule involved in glycosylation. Mannose 1-phosphate can be efficiently synthesised using D-mannose or Methyl alpha-D-mannopyranoside as the starting material.

== See also ==
- Congenital disorder of glycosylation
- Mannose-6-phosphate
