= Dolichol monophosphate =

Names
- Preferred IUPAC name [3,7,11,15,19-pentamethylicosa-6,10,14,18-tetraenyl] dihydrogen phosphate
- Systematic IUPAC name [(3,7,11,15,19-pentamethylicosa-6,10,14,18-tetraen-1-yl)oxy]phosphonic acid
- Other names Dolichol phosphate Dolichyl monophosphate Dolichyl phosphate

Identifiers
CAS Number	12698-55-4
3D model (JSmol)	Interactive image
ChEBI	CHEBI:16214
ChemSpider	21864805 (6Z,10E,14E)
KEGG	C00110
MeSH	Dolichol+monophosphate
PubChem CID	24892715 (6Z,10E,14E)
- InChI: InChI=1S/C25H45O4P/c1-21(2)11-7-12-22(3)13-8-14-23(4)15-9-16-24(5)17-10-18-25(6)19-20-29-30(26,27)28/h11,13,15,17,25H,7-10,12,14,16,18-20H2,1-6H3,(H2,26,27,28) Key: GYBNOAFGEKAZTA-UHFFFAOYSA-N
- SMILES: CC(CCOP(O)(O)=O)CCC=C(C)CCC=C(C)CCC=C(C)CCC=C(C)C

Properties
Chemical formula	C_{25}H_{45}O_{4}P
Molar mass	440.605 g·mol^{−1}
- Except where otherwise noted, data are given for materials in their standard state (at 25 °C [77 °F], 100 kPa). Infobox references

Dolichol monophosphate is a phosphate ester of dolichol. It is important in biosynthesis of glycoproteins, occurring in several mammalians' organs, especially the liver.

== See also ==
- Dolichyl-phosphatase
- Dolichyl-phosphate beta-D-mannosyltransferase
- DPM1
