= Dolichol =

Group of long-chain unsaturated lipids

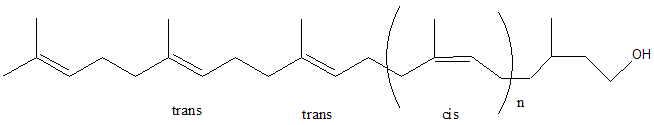
- Structure of Dolichol.

Identifiers
CAS Number	11029-02-0; (dolichol-20): 2067-66-5
3D model (JSmol)	(dolichol-20): Interactive image
ChEBI	CHEBI:16091
ChemSpider	(dolichol-20): 4938490
KEGG	C00381
MeSH	Dolichol
PubChem CID	6433320
- InChI: (dolichol-20): InChI=1S/C100H164O/c1-81(2)41-22-42-82(3)43-23-44-83(4)45-24-46-84(5)47-25-48-85(6)49-26-50-86(7)51-27-52-87(8)53-28-54-88(9)55-29-56-89(10)57-30-58-90(11)59-31-60-91(12)61-32-62-92(13)63-33-64-93(14)65-34-66-94(15)67-35-68-95(16)69-36-70-96(17)71-37-72-97(18)73-38-74-98(19)75-39-76-99(20)77-40-78-100(21)79-80-101/h41,43,45,47,49,51,53,55,57,59,61,63,65,67,69,71,73,75,77,100-101H,22-40,42,44,46,48,50,52,54,56,58,60,62,64,66,68,70,72,74,76,78-80H2,1-21H3/b82-43+,83-45+,84-47+,85-49+,86-51-,87-53+,88-55+,89-57+,90-59+,91-61+,92-63+,93-65+,94-67+,95-69-,96-71+,97-73+,98-75+,99-77+ Key: KEVPZUBEAUSPNJ-OYHKHEHLSA-N
- SMILES: (dolichol-20): CC(CC/C=C(\C)/CC/C=C(\C)/CC/C=C(\C)/CC/C=C(\C)/CC/C=C(/C)\CC/C=C(\C)/CC/C=C(\C)/CC/C=C(\C)/CC/C=C(\C)/CC/C=C(\C)/CC/C=C(\C)/CC/C=C(\C)/CC/C=C(\C)/CC/C=C(/C)\CC/C=C(\C)/CC/C=C(\C)/CC/C=C(\C)/CC/C=C(\C)/CCC=C(C)C)CCO

Properties
Chemical formula	Variable; Dolichol-20: C_{100}H_{164}O
Molar mass	Variable; Dolichol-20: 1382.37 g/mol
- Except where otherwise noted, data are given for materials in their standard state (at 25 °C [77 °F], 100 kPa). verify (what is ?) Infobox references

Dolichol refers to any of a group of long-chain mostly unsaturated organic compounds that are made up of varying numbers of isoprene units terminating in an α-saturated isoprenoid group, containing an alcohol functional group.

== Functions ==
Dolichols play a role in the post-translational modification of proteins known as N-glycosylation in the form of dolichol phosphate. Dolichols function as a membrane anchor for the formation of the oligosaccharide Glc_{3}–Man_{9}–GlcNAc_{2} (where Glc is glucose, Man is mannose, and GlcNAc is N-acetylglucosamine). This oligosaccharide is transferred from the dolichol donor onto certain asparagine residues (onto a specific sequence that is "Asn–X–Ser/Thr") of newly forming polypeptide chains. Dolichol is also involved in transfer of the monosaccharides to the forming Glc_{3}–Man_{9}–GlcNAc_{2}–Dolichol carrier.

In addition, dolichols can be adducted to proteins as a posttranslational modification, a process in which branched carbohydrate trees are formed on a dolichol moiety and then transferred to an assembly of proteins to form a large glycoprotein in the rough endoplasmic reticulum.

Dolichols are the major lipid component (14% by mass) of human substantia nigra (SN) neuromelanin. Dolichol phosphate was discovered at the University of Liverpool in the 1960s, although researchers did not know its function at the time of discovery.

== Role in aging ==
Dolichol has been suggested to be used as a biomarker for aging. During aging, the human brain shows a progressive increase in levels of dolichol, a reduction in levels of ubiquinone, but relatively unchanged concentrations of cholesterol and dolichyl phosphate. In the neurodegenerative disease Alzheimer's disease, the situation is reversed, with decreased levels of dolichol and increased levels of ubiquinone. The concentrations of dolichyl phosphate are also increased, while cholesterol remains unchanged. The isoprenoid changes in Alzheimer's disease differ from those occurring during normal aging, and, therefore, this disease cannot be regarded as a result of premature aging. The increase in the sugar carrier dolichyl phosphate may reflect an increased rate of glycosylation in the diseased brain, and the increase in the endogenous anti-oxidant ubiquinone an attempt to protect the brain from oxidative stress, for instance, induced by lipid peroxidation.

== Synthesis ==
Dolichol is a product of the HMG-CoA reductase pathway (also known as the mevalonate pathway), and as such their creation and availability are affected by mevalonate inhibition, the main target of statins. First, a cis (or Z) -prenyltransferase (Dehydrodolichyl diphosphate synthase in humans) catalyzes the condensation of farnesyl diphosphate (FPP) with a varying number (dependent on the particular cis-prenyltransferase) of isopentenyl diphosphate (IPP) molecules, resulting in the formation of a polyprenyl diphosphate (also known as dehydrodolichyl diphosphate). This subsequently undergoes loss of both phosphate groups, resulting in a polyprenol (dehydrodolichol). Lastly, the α isoprenoid unit is saturated by α-saturase (still a hypothetical enzyme), and this α-saturated polyprenyl alcohol is known as dolichol.

== Other ==
Dolichols are found in eukaryotes and in archaea, although similar polyprenol molecules are found in bacteria. Polyprenols in bacteria do not contain an α-saturated isoprenoid and are typically smaller in terms of isoprenoid units or carbon length. Polyprenols perform similar functions within bacteria; that is, they function as glycosyl carrier lipids involved in formation of complex branched polysaccharide. However, the cellular process they are involved in is not glycosylation, but instead cell wall biosynthesis. Statins decrease dolichol levels in the body.

== Medical significance ==
The Australian pharmaceutical company Solagran has been investigating the medical significance of polyprenols and their substitution with dolichols when ingested where there is a deficiency. Trials of Ropren (already pharmaceutically registered as a hepatoprotector) in relation to neurodegenerative diseases (including Alzheimer's disease) in both Russia and Australia indicate considerable potential as a safe and effective treatment.

== History ==
Isolation of a very long hitherto unknown isoprenoid alcohol was first published in 1960; it was therefore named dolichol, from Ancient Greek δόλιχος (dolichos, "long").

== See also ==
- Dolichol kinase
- Polyprenols
- Mevalonate inhibition#Dolichol Inhibition
