= Dolichol monophosphate mannose =

Names
- IUPAC name [(6E,10E,14E,18E,22E,26E,30E,34E,38E,42E,46E,50E,54E,58E,62E,66E,70E,74E)- 3,7,11,15,19,23,27,31,35,39,43,47,51,55,59,63,67,71,75,79-icosamethyloctaconta-6,10,14,18,22,26,30,34,38,42,46,50,54,58,62,66,70,74,78-nonadecaenyl] [(2S,3S,4S,5S,6R)-3,4,5-trihydroxy-6-(hydroxymethyl)tetrahydropyran-2-yl] hydrogen phosphate

Identifiers
CAS Number	55598-56-6
3D model (JSmol)	Interactive image
ChemSpider	4939417
PubChem CID	6434507
- InChI: InChI=1S/C106H175O9P/c1-82(2)41-22-42-83(3)43-23-44-84(4)45-24-46-85(5)47-25-48-86(6)49-26-50-87(7)51-27-52-88(8)53-28-54-89(9)55-29-56-90(10)57-30-58-91(11)59-31-60-92(12)61-32-62-93(13)63-33-64-94(14)65-34-66-95(15)67-35-68-96(16)69-36-70-97(17)71-37-72-98(18)73-38-74-99(19)75-39-76-100(20)77-40-78-101(21)79-80-113-116(111,112)115-106-105(110)104(109)103(108)102(81-107)114-106/h41,43,45,47,49,51,53,55,57,59,61,63,65,67,69,71,73,75,77,101-110H,22-40,42,44,46,48,50,52,54,56,58,60,62,64,66,68,70,72,74,76,78-81H2,1-21H3,(H,111,112)/b83-43+,84-45+,85-47+,86-49+,87-51+,88-53+,89-55+,90-57+,91-59+,92-61+,93-63+,94-65+,95-67+,96-69+,97-71+,98-73+,99-75+,100-77+/t101?,102-,103-,104+,105+,106+/m1/s1 Key: IPAOLVGASNLKMS-WIFKHAHXSA-N
- SMILES: CC(CC/C=C(\C)/CC/C=C(\C)/CC/C=C(\C)/CC/C=C(\C)/CC/C=C(\C)/CC/C=C(\C)/CC/C=C(\C)/CC/C=C(\C)/CC/C=C(\C)/CC/C=C(\C)/CC/C=C(\C)/CC/C=C(\C)/CC/C=C(\C)/CC/C=C(\C)/CC/C=C(\C)/CC/C=C(\C)/CC/C=C(\C)/CC/C=C(\C)/CCC=C(C)C)CCOP(=O)(O)O[C@H]1[C@H]([C@H]([C@@H]([C@H](O1)CO)O)O)O

Properties
Chemical formula	C_{106}H_{175}O_{9}P
Molar mass	1624.531 g·mol^{−1}
- Except where otherwise noted, data are given for materials in their standard state (at 25 °C [77 °F], 100 kPa). verify (what is ?) Infobox references

Dolichol monophosphate mannose is a chemical compound involved in glycosylation.
