= Congenital muscular dystrophy =

- Autosomal recessive is generally the manner in which CMD is inherited
- Specialty: Neurology
- Symptoms: Muscle weakness
- Types: 17 types of CMD
- Diagnostic method: NRI, EMG
- Treatment: Currently there's no cure; one should monitor cardiac function and respiratory function

Congenital muscular dystrophies are autosomal recessively-inherited muscle diseases. They are a group of heterogeneous disorders characterized by muscle weakness which is present at birth and the different changes on muscle biopsy that ranges from myopathic to overtly dystrophic due to the age at which the biopsy takes place.

== Signs and symptoms ==
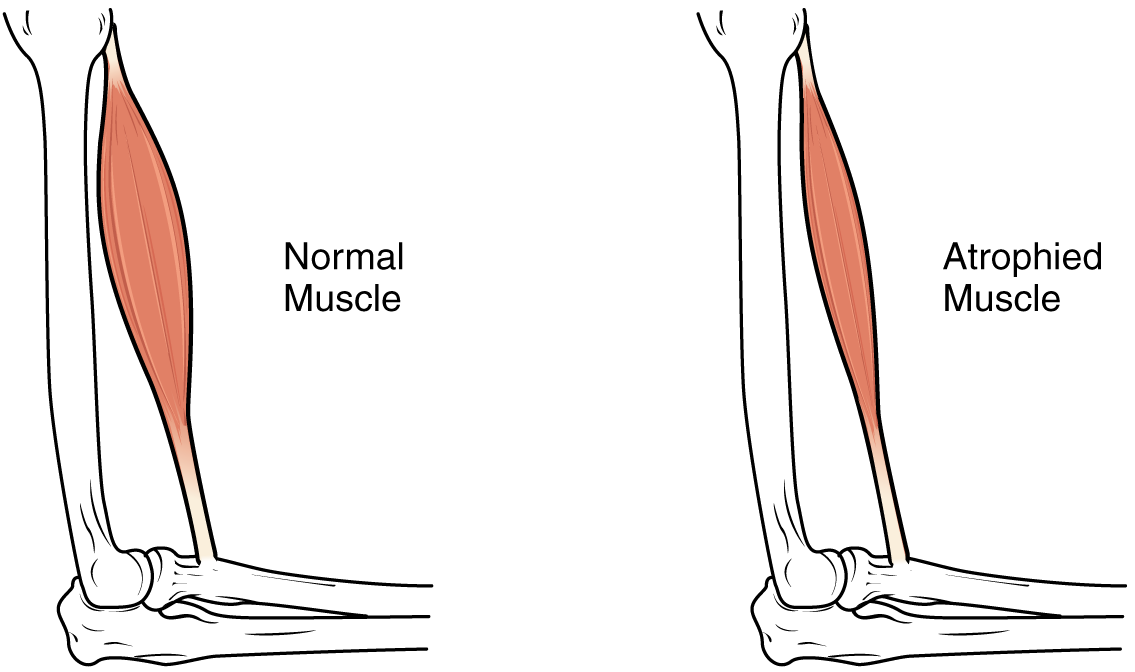
Muscle atrophy

Most infants with CMD will display some progressive muscle weakness or muscle wasting (atrophy), although there can be different degrees and symptoms of severeness of progression. The weakness is indicated as hypotonia, or lack of muscle tone, which can make an infant seem unstable. Eventually, most patients develop joint contractures or fixed joint deformities.

Children may be slow with their motor skills; such as rolling over, sitting up or walking, or may not even reach these milestones of life. Some of the rarer forms of CMD can result in significant learning disabilities.

== Genetics ==
Congenital muscular dystrophies (CMDs) are autosomal recessively inherited, except in some cases of de novo gene mutation and Ullrich congenital muscular dystrophy. This means that in most cases, both parents must be carriers of a CMD gene in order for it to be inherited. CMDs are heterogenous and thus far there have been 35 genes discovered to be involved with different forms of CMD resulting from these mutations. There are different forms of CMD, often categorized by the protein changes caused by an atypical gene.

One group of forms is that for which a patient with affected genes displays defects in genes necessary to the function of the extracellular matrix. One such form is merosin-deficient congenital muscular dystrophy (MDC1A), which accounts for around one-third of all CMD cases and is caused by mutations in the LAMA2 gene on the 6q2 chromosome, encoding for the laminin-α2 chain. Laminin-α2 is an essential part of proteins like Laminin-2 and Laminin-4 that have important functions in muscle movement, and most patients with a mutated LAMA2 gene have no expression of Laminin-α2 in muscle tissue. Another form in this group is Ullrich congenital muscular dystrophy, which is caused by mutations in the COL6A1, COL6A2 and COL6A3 genes that encode for three of the alpha chains making up Collagen VI. Collagen VI is important in muscle, tendon, and skin tissue, and functions to attach cells to the extracellular matrix. Ullrich CMD can be caused by both autosomal recessive or autosomal dominant mutations, although dominant mutations are usually de novo. Recessive mutations often lead to a complete absence of Collagen VI in the extracellular matrix, while there are different types of dominant mutations that can cause partial function of Collagen VI. Mutations in the same three genes can also cause milder phenotypes, namely intermediate collagen VI-related dystrophy and Bethlem myopathy (also called Bethlem muscular dystrophy). Together with Ullrich CMD, these form a continuum of overlapping phenotypes known as collagen VI-related dystrophies.

Another form of CMD is rigid spine congenital muscular dystrophy (RSMD1), or rigid spine syndrome, which is caused by mutations in the SELENON gene encoding for selenoprotein N. The exact function of selenoprotein N is unknown, but it is expressed in the rough endoplasmic reticulum of skeletal muscle, heart, brain, lung, and placenta tissues, as well as at high levels in the diaphragm. RSMD1 is characterized by axial and respiratory weakness, spinal rigidity and scoliosis, and muscular atrophy, and while it is a rare form of CMD, SEPN1 mutations are observed in other congenital myopathies.

Some of the most common forms of CMDs are dystroglycanopathies caused by glycosylation defects of α-dystroglycan (α-DG), which helps link the extracellular matrix and the cytoskeleton. Dystroglycanopathies are caused by mutations in genes encoding for proteins involved in modifying α-DG after translation of the protein, not mutations in the protein itself. 19 genes have been discovered that cause α-DG-related dystrophies, with a wide range of phenotypic effects observed, characterized by brain malformations along with muscular dystrophy. Walker-Warburg syndrome (WWS) is the most severe dystroglycanopathy phenotype, with the POMT1 gene as the first reported causative gene, although there have been 11 additional genes implicated in WWS. These genes include POMT2, FKRP, FKTN, ISPD, CTDC2, TMEM5, POMGnT1, B3GALnT2, GMPPB, B3GnT1, and SGK196, many of which have been identified as involved in other dystroglycanopathies. Patients display muscle weakness and cerebellar and ocular malformations, with a life expectancy of less than 1 year. In 2024, a high-throughput functional assay was developed to measure glycosylation levels and assess the functional impact of variants in the enzymes responsible for the glycosylation of α-DG.

An additional dystroglycanopathy phenotype is Fukuyama congenital muscular dystrophy (FCMD) caused by a mutation in the Fukutin (FKTN) gene, which is the second most common type of muscular dystrophy in Japan after Duchenne muscular dystrophy. The founder mutation of FCMD is a 3- kilo base pair retrotransposon insertion in the noncoding region of FKTN, leading to muscle weakness, abnormal eye function, seizures, and intellectual disability. While the exact function of FKTN is unknown, FKTN mRNA is expressed in fetuses in the developing CNS, muscles, and eyes, and is likely necessary for normal development since complete inactivation leads to embryonic death at 7 days. Another phenotype, Muscle-eye-brain disease (MEB) is the dystroglycanopathy most prevalent in Finland, and is caused by mutations in the POMGnT1, FKRP, FKTN, ISPD, and TMEM5 genes. The POMGnT1 gene is expressed in the same tissues as FKTN, and MEB appears to have a similar severity as FCMD. However, symptoms unique to MEB include glaucoma, atrophy of the optic nerves, and retinal generation. The least severe phenotype of dystroglycanopathies is CMD type 1c (MDC1C), caused by mutations in the FKRP and the LARGE gene, with a phenotype similar to MEB and WWS. MDC1C also includes Limb-Girdle muscular dystrophy.

== Mechanism ==
In terms of the mechanism of congenital muscular dystrophy, one finds that though there are many types of CMD the glycosylation of α-dystroglycan and alterations in those genes that are involved are an important part of this conditions pathophysiology

== Diagnosis ==
=== Musculoskeletal examination of congenital muscular dystrophies ===
Muscle fibrosis and Joint contractures or fixed deformities are cardinal clinical signs of congenital muscular dystrophies. Muscle fibrosis and shortening eventually lead to joint contractures or fixed deformities. They are important to the diagnosis of CMD. However, some patients initially present with joint laxity. Joint deformities can occur in the extremities and spine. Severe deformities can result in joint dislocation and walking difficulties or gait abnormalities. However, the specific pattern of muscle involvement in each of the CMD subtypes is not fully elucidated. A recent review identified CMD subtype-specific clinical patterns of muscle and Joint involvement which could be of help to the differential diagnosis of CMD subtypes. This was especially true for Merosin-deficient congenital muscular dystrophy (MDC1A) or LAMA2-related CMD subtype. Nonetheless, these muscle and Joint patterns of involvement have to be correlated with other clinical signs, neuro-imaging reports, muscle biopsy immune-staining and molecular or genetic analysis results, whenever available. This comprehensive approach is critical for the correct and timely diagnosis of CMDs.

=== Cardiac examination of congenital muscular dystrophies ===
The cardiac manifestations of CMD vary greatly. They can range from non-existent or mild to severe and fatal cardiac involvement. Generally, cardiac abnormalities in CMD can manifest in dilated cardiomyopathy, systolic dysfunction, hypertrophic cardiomyopathy, myocardial fibrosis or fatal ventricular arrhythmias.

Dystroglycanopathies as Fukuyama Congenital Muscular Dystrophy have a relatively high likelihood for development of significant cardiac manifestations. In Merosin-deficient congenital muscular dystrophy (MDC1A) or LAMA2-related CMD cardiac manifestations are usually asymptomatic. Cardiac manifestations have also been associated with Limb-girdle muscular dystrophy 2I and LMNA-related CMD. Cardiac manifestations may be secondary to severe thoracic spine deformity as in rigid spine syndrome. Cardiac examination and screening are important to patients with CMDs. Surveillance is important to those with a diagnosed cardiac involvement.

Creatine kinase

For the diagnosis of congenital muscular dystrophy, the following tests/exams are done:

- Lab study (CK levels)
- Muscle MRI and especially whole body muscle MRI has recently been used to describe muscle abnormalities in patients with primary laminin-α2 (merosin) deficiency subtype of CMD.
- EMG
- Genetic testing

=== Classification (different types of congenital muscular dystrophies) ===
The subtypes of congenital muscular dystrophy have been established through variations in multiple genes. Phenotype, as well as, genotype classifications are used to establish the subtypes, in some literature.

One finds that congenital muscular dystrophies can be either autosomal dominant or autosomal recessive in terms of the inheritance pattern, though the latter is much more common

Individuals with congenital muscular dystrophy fall into one of the following types:

- CMD with brain-eye, also called muscle-eye-brain disease, is a rare form of congenital muscular dystrophy (autosomal recessive disorder) causing a lack of normal muscle tone which can delay walking due to being weak, also paralysis of eye muscles and intellectual disability which affects an individual's way of processing information. It is caused by a mutation in the POMGNT1 gene.
- CMD with adducted (drawn inward) thumbs. a rare form of CMD causing permanent shortening of the toe joints and lack of muscle tone which can delay walking due to the individual being weak. The person with this form of congenital muscular dystrophy might have mild cerebellar hypoplasia in some cases .
- CMD/LGMD without MR-first years of a newborn begins with weakness, which affects motive skills, walking can be accomplished in adolescence, deformity and rigidity of joints. The joints, neck and spine; progressive cardiomyopathy at the early ages; cardiac rhythm abnormalities may be present in the individual.
- Large related CMD at the beginning of the newborn period, the issues the infant receives are; poor muscle tone and weak motor function; the individual will present with intellectual disability and the structure of the brain will likely be abnormal .
- CMD with cerebellar atrophy severe cerebellar hypoplasia, poor muscle tone, delayed in motor milestones, lack of coordination in motive skills, difficulty speaking, involuntary movements and some intellectual disability. Furthermore, muscle biopsy does not reveal any deficiency.
- Walker–Warburg syndrome at the beginning a progressive weakness and low muscle tone at birth or during early infancy; small muscles; the majority of affected children do not live more than 3 years of age. Eye structure problems are present, with accompanying visual impairment.
- CMD with primary laminin-α2 (merosin) deficiency (MDC1A) intellect in such individuals is unaffected, proximal muscle weakening and rigid spine are present along with respiratory involvement (with disease progression).
- CMD/LGMD with MR weakness and deformity and rigidity joints present at birth, poor muscle tone, slowly progressive; individuals may present with cerebellar cysts (or cortical problems), microcephaly may be present as well. Abnormal flexibility might occur, spinal curvature possible.
- CDG I (DPM3) some of the symptoms at birth and throughout the infant's life are weakness or poor muscle tone. The individual may present with cardiomyopathy (no outflow obstruction), a rise in serum creatine kinase might be present as well. Some IQ problems may be present, along with weakness in the proximal muscles. Also of note, a reduction of dolichol phosphate mannose .
- CDG I (DPM2) weak muscle tone starting in first weeks of the infant, the individual may show severe neurologic physical characteristics that result in fatality early in life. Hypotonia and myopathic facies may be present in such individuals, while contractures of joints may also be present. Finally, myoclonic seizures may occur at a very early age (3 months).
- CDG Ie (DPM1) at birth the infant will have weakness with involvement of the respiratory system, as well as, severe mental and psychomotor problems.By age of 3, the individual may be blind with speech problems. Microcephaly may occur in early childhood, as well as seizures.
- CMD with spinal rigidity present at birth can have poor muscle tone and weakness, reduced respiratory capacity, muscles could be deformed, beginning early ages stabilization or slow decline spinal rigidity, limited mobility to flex the neck and spine, spinal curvature and progressing deformity and rigidity joints, minor cardiac abnormalities, normal intelligence.

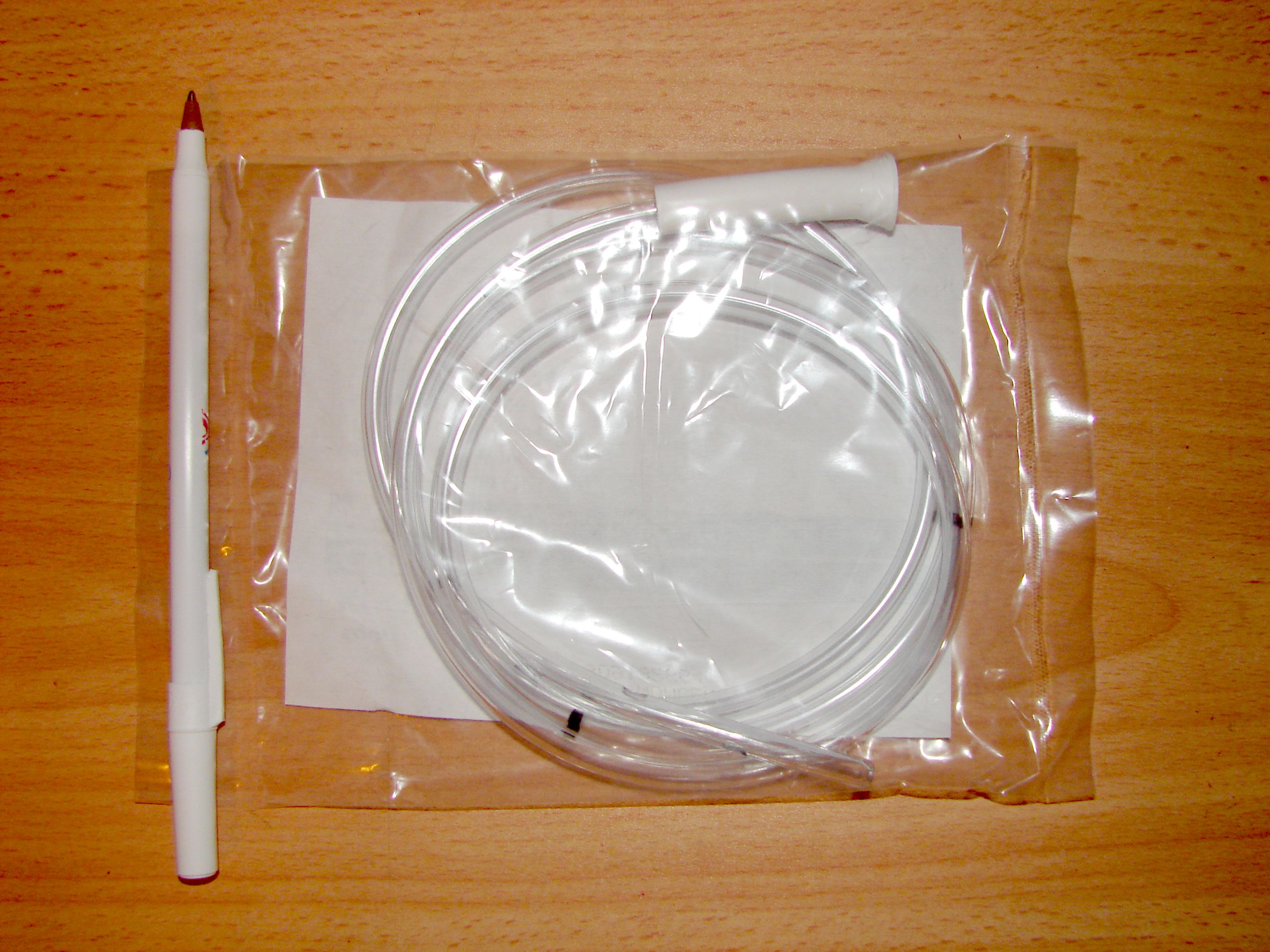
Nasogastric tube

- CMD with lamin A/C abnormality with in the first year the infant is weak, individual may have problems later lifting arms and head. May need nasogastric tube, limb weakness and elevated serum creatine kinase. Individual may show a diaphragmatic manner when breathing.
- Integrin α7 weakness which is present at birth, poor muscle tone with late walking, loss of muscle tissue, intellectual disability.Furthermore, the creatine kinase level was elevated.
- Fukuyama CMD-in Western countries this type of CMD is rare, but it is common in Japan. The effects this disease has on infants are on a spectrum of severity. They include weakness in muscle tone within the first year, deformed and rigid joints, spinal curvatures, seizures, eye involvement and intellectual disability. Some patients may achieve limited walking mobility.
- Merosin-deficient CMD- weakness in muscle tone present at birth, spectrum of severity; may show hypotonia and poor motor development. Most individuals have periventricular white matter problems. However, intellectual disability is rare in most cases.
- Merosin-positive CMD some forms of merosin-positive CMD are: Early spinal rigidity, CMD with muscle hypertrophy, CMD with muscle hypertrophy and respiratory failure.

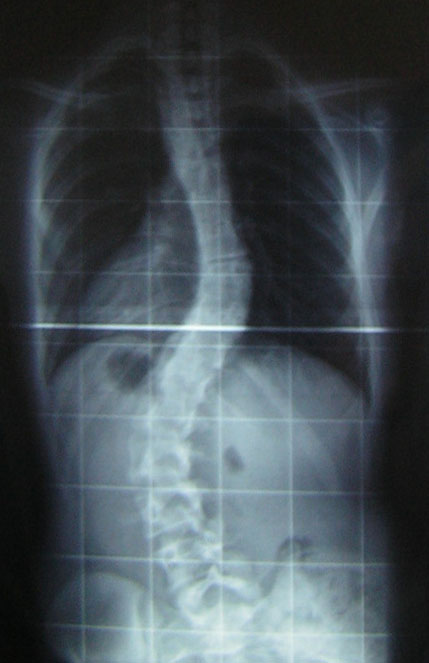
Scoliosis

- Ullrich congenital muscular dystrophy present at birth is weakness, and poor muscle tone.

Will have some deformity and rigidity joints, some joints will have excessive flexibility, spinal rigidity, curvature, respiratory impairment, soft skin, normal cardiac function and normal intelligence.

=== Differential diagnosis ===
The DDx of congenital muscular dystrophy, in an affected individual, is as follows (non-neuromuscular genetic conditions also exist):

- Metabolic myopathies
- Dystrophinopathies
- Emery-Dreifuss muscular dystrophy

== Management ==
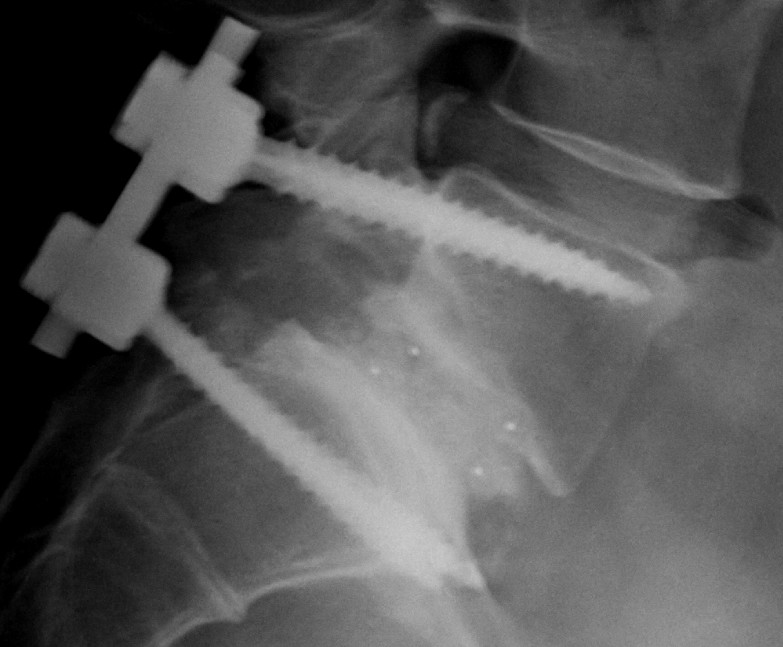
Spinal fixation and fusion

In terms of the management of congenital muscular dystrophy the American Academy of Neurology recommends that the individuals need to have monitoring of cardiac function, respiratory, and gastrointestinal. Additionally it is believed that therapy in speech, orthopedic and physical areas, would improve the person's quality of life.

While there is currently no cure available, it is important to preserve muscle activity and any available correction of skeletal abnormalities (as scoliosis). Orthopedic procedures, like spinal fusion, maintain/increase the individual's prospect for more physical movement.

== See also ==
- Muscular dystrophy
- Ullrich congenital muscular dystrophy
- Fukuyama congenital muscular dystrophy
