= Walker–Warburg syndrome =

- Other names: HARD syndrome, Warburg syndrome
- Walker–Warburg syndrome has an autosomal recessive pattern of inheritance.
- Specialty: Ophthalmology, neurology, medical genetics
- Frequency: 0.0001%

Walker–Warburg syndrome (WWS), also called Warburg syndrome, Chemke syndrome, HARD syndrome (Hydrocephalus, Agyria and Retinal Dysplasia), Pagon syndrome, cerebroocular dysgenesis (COD) or cerebroocular dysplasia-muscular dystrophy syndrome (COD-MD), is a rare form of autosomal recessive congenital muscular dystrophy. It is associated with brain (lissencephaly, hydrocephalus, cerebellar malformations) and eye abnormalities. This condition has a worldwide distribution. Walker-Warburg syndrome is estimated to affect 1 in 60,500 newborns worldwide.

== Presentation ==
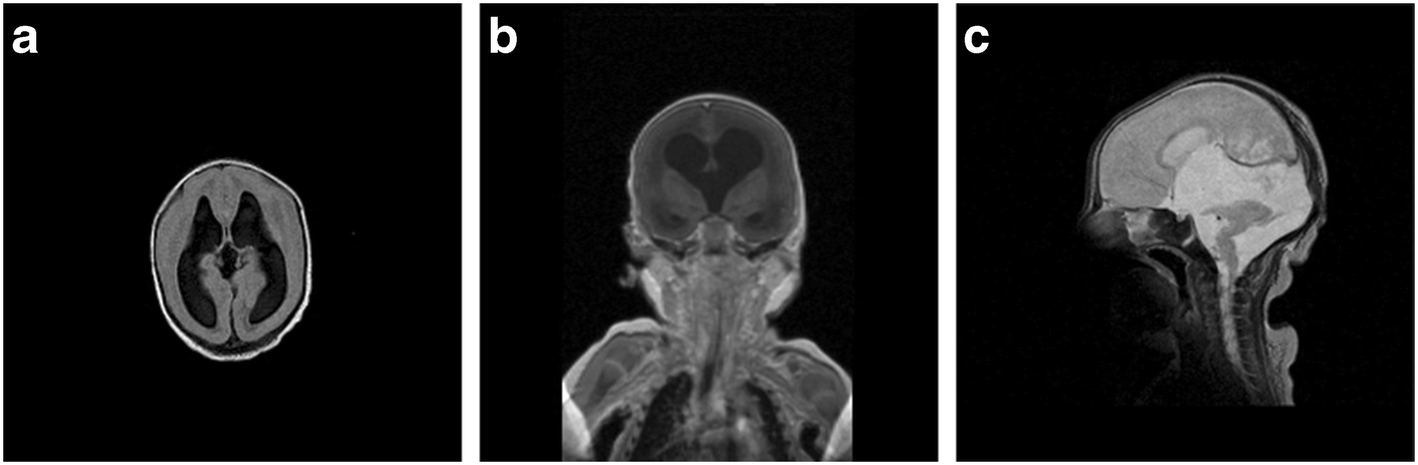
This illustration shows patient’s brain MRI with Walker-Warburg syndrome. On MRI bilateral enlargement of the internal ventricles and cobblestone lissencephaly (Type 2) with lack of gyration can be seen.

The clinical manifestations present at birth are generalized hypotonia, muscle weakness, developmental delay with intellectual disability and occasional seizures. The congenital muscular dystrophy is characterized by hypoglycosylation of α-dystroglycan. Those born with the disease also experience severe ocular and brain defects. Half of all children with WWS are born with encephalocele, which is a gap in the skull that will not seal. The meninges of the brain protrude through this gap due to the neural tube failing to close during development. A malformation of the a baby's cerebellum is often a sign of this disease. Common ocular issues associated with WWS are abnormally small eyes and retinal abnormalities cause by an underdeveloped light-sensitive area in the back of the eye.

== Genetics ==
Several genes have been implicated in the etiology of Walker–Warburg syndrome, and following genes are: POMT1, POMT2, POMGNT1, FKTN, FKRP, LARGE, CRPPA, GTDC2, DAG1, RXYLT1, B3GALNT2, POMK, B3GNT1, GMPPB. All these enzymes (except for DAG1, which is dystroglycan itself) participate in glycosylation of α-dystroglycan, which is important for the proper function of the protein. DAG1 mutations can cause either hypoglycosalation or pertubated maturation/transport to plasma membrane.

First gene to cause WWS, POMT1, was discovered in 2001 by de Bernabe and colleagues.

== Diagnosis ==
Laboratory investigations usually show elevated creatine kinase, myopathic/dystrophic muscle pathology and altered α-dystroglycan. Antenatal diagnosis is possible in families with known mutations. Prenatal ultrasound may be helpful for diagnosis in families where the molecular defect is unknown.

== Prognosis ==
No specific treatment is available. Management is only supportive and preventive. Those who are diagnosed with the disease often die within the first few months of life. Almost all children with the disease die by the age of three.

== Eponym ==
WWS is named for Arthur Earl Walker and Mette Warburg. Its alternative names include Chemke’s syndrome and Pagon’s syndrome, named after Juan M. Chemke and Roberta A. Pagon.
