= CDP-L-Ribitol Pyrophosphorylase A =

CRPPA

Identifiers
- Aliases: CRPPA, MDDGA7, Nip, hCG_1745121, MDDGC7, isoprenoid synthase domain containing, hISPD, LGMDR20, CDP-L-ribitol pyrophosphorylase A, ISPD
- External IDs: OMIM: 614631; MGI: 1923097; GeneCards: CRPPA
Available structures
PDB	Ortholog search: PDBe RCSB
PDB	List of PDB id codes 4CVH
Enzyme activity
EC #	BRENDA	ExPASy	KEGG	MetaCyc
2.7.7.40	↗	↗	↗	↗

Gene location (Human)
Chr.	Chromosome 7 (human)
Band	7p21.2	Start	16,087,525 bp
Band	7p21.2	End	16,502,504 bp

Gene location (Mouse)
Chr.	Chromosome 12 (mouse)
Band	12|12 A3	Start	36,431,449 bp
Band	12|12 A3	End	36,739,502 bp
RNA expression pattern
Bgee	Human / Mouse (ortholog); Top expressed in: corpus callosum; testicle; Achilles tendon; gonad; skeletal muscle tissue; prefrontal cortex; stromal cell of endometrium; epithelium of colon; superior frontal gyrus; liver / Top expressed in: lumbar spinal ganglion; facial motor nucleus; substantia nigra; right kidney; trigeminal ganglion; Epithelium of choroid plexus; embryo; dentate gyrus of hippocampal formation granule cell; neural layer of retina; embryo; More reference expression data
BioGPS	n/a
Gene ontology
Molecular function	transferase activity; nucleotidyltransferase activity; catalytic activity; protein homodimerization activity; D-ribitol-5-phosphate cytidylyltransferase activity; cytidylyltransferase activity
Cellular component	cytoplasm; cytosol
Biological process	protein glycosylation; protein O-linked mannosylation; isoprenoid biosynthetic process; axon guidance
Sources:Amigo / QuickGO
Orthologs
Databases	NCBI: entry; OMA: entry
Species	Human	Mouse
Entrez	729920	75847
Ensembl	ENSG00000214960	ENSMUSG00000043153
UniProt	A4D126	Q5RJG7
RefSeq (mRNA)	NM_001101417; NM_001101426; NM_001368197	NM_001289502; NM_001289503; NM_001289504; NM_178629; NM_001364305
RefSeq (protein)	NP_001094887; NP_001094896; NP_001355126	NP_001276431; NP_001276432; NP_001276433; NP_848744; NP_001351234
Location (UCSC)	Chr 7: 16.09 – 16.5 Mb	Chr 12: 36.43 – 36.74 Mb
PubMed search
- Wikidata
View/Edit Human	View/Edit Mouse

CDP-L-Ribitol Pyrophosphorylase A is an enzyme encoded by CRPPA gene.

== Gene ==
CRPPA is located on the short arm (p) of chromosome 7 on position 21.2, from base pair 16,087,525 to base pair 16,502,504.

== Function ==
This enzyme is located in the cytoplasm, which synthesises CDP-ribitiol from CTP and Ribitol-5-P. CDP-ribitiol is used by FKRP and FKTN to glycosylate alpha-dystroglycan.

== Clinical significance ==
Mutations in this gene can cause Limb-girdle muscular dystrophy, Muscle-eye-brain disease and Walker-Warburg syndrome.
