= Pikachurin =

Protein-coding gene in the species Homo sapiens

EGFLAM

Identifiers
- Aliases: EGFLAM, AGRINL, AGRNL, PIKA, EGF like, fibronectin type III and laminin G domains, Smp_128580.1
- External IDs: OMIM: 617683; MGI: 2146149; GeneCards: EGFLAM

Gene location (Human)
Chr.	Chromosome 5 (human)
Band	5p13.2-p13.1	Start	38,258,409 bp
Band	5p13.2-p13.1	End	38,465,480 bp

Gene location (Mouse)
Chr.	Chromosome 15 (mouse)
Band	15|15 A1	Start	7,235,601 bp
Band	15|15 A1	End	7,427,876 bp
RNA expression pattern
Bgee	Human / Mouse (ortholog); Top expressed in: gastrocnemius muscle; muscle of thigh; tibialis anterior muscle; deltoid muscle; vastus lateralis muscle; tibial nerve; apex of heart; biceps brachii; Skeletal muscle tissue of biceps brachii; gonad / Top expressed in: neural layer of retina; efferent ductule; spermatocyte; interventricular septum; spermatid; medial head of gastrocnemius muscle; left lung lobe; lumbar spinal ganglion; Gonadal ridge; vastus lateralis muscle; More reference expression data
BioGPS	n/a
Gene ontology
Molecular function	glycosaminoglycan binding; calcium ion binding
Cellular component	extracellular region; basement membrane; cell junction; interstitial matrix; synapse; extracellular matrix
Biological process	peptide cross-linking via chondroitin 4-sulfate glycosaminoglycan; extracellular matrix organization; positive regulation of cell-substrate adhesion; animal organ morphogenesis; tissue development; cell migration; substrate adhesion-dependent cell spreading
Sources:Amigo / QuickGO
Orthologs
Databases	NCBI: entry; OMA: entry
Species	Human	Mouse
Entrez	133584	268780
Ensembl	ENSG00000164318	ENSMUSG00000042961
UniProt	Q63HQ2	Q4VBE4
RefSeq (mRNA)	NM_182801; NM_001205301; NM_152403; NM_182798; NM_182799	NM_001289496; NM_001289498; NM_178748
RefSeq (protein)	NP_001192230; NP_689616; NP_877950; NP_877953	NP_001276425; NP_001276427; NP_848863
Location (UCSC)	Chr 5: 38.26 – 38.47 Mb	Chr 15: 7.24 – 7.43 Mb
PubMed search
- Wikidata
View/Edit Human	View/Edit Mouse

Pikachurin, also known as AGRINL (AGRINL) and EGF-like, fibronectin type-III and laminin G-like domain-containing protein (EGFLAM), is a protein that in humans is encoded by the EGFLAM gene.

Pikachurin is a dystroglycan-interacting protein which has an essential role in the precise interactions between the photoreceptor ribbon synapse and the bipolar dendrites. The binding with dystroglycan (DG) depends on several factors (glycosylation of DG, presence of divalent cations, presence of other proteins).

A non-correct binding between pikachurin and DG is associated with muscular dystrophies that often involve eye abnormalities.

== Discovery and nomenclature ==
Pikachurin is an extracellular matrix-like retinal protein first discovered in 2008 in Japan by Shigeru Sato et al. and named after Pikachu, a species of the Pokémon franchise. The name of this protein was inspired by Pikachu's "lightning-fast moves".

Pikachurin was initially identified in a microarray analysis of gene expression profiles of the retinas of wild-type and Otx2 knockout mice. A RT-PCR analysis was used to confirm that Otx2 regulates the expression of pikachurin, it was known because there was an absence of expression of pikachurin in the Otx2 mice retina, so it indicates that Otx2 regulates pikachurin. The localization of pikachurin to synaptic cleft in the photoreceptor ribbon synapse was determined using fluorescent antibodies. Tissue targeting of gene disruption of pikachurin was used to determine that this protein is necessary for proper synaptic signal transmission and visual function. α-dystroglycan was shown to interact with pikachurin through immunoprecipitation.

== Pikachurin-dystroglycan interaction ==
Dystroglycan ligand with other proteins is essential. Glycosylation of dystroglycan is necessary for its ligand binding activity. Mutations in glycosyltransferase enzymes cause abnormal glycosylation of dystroglycan. This hypoglycosylation is associated with less binding with other proteins and causes some congenital muscular dystrophy. Pikachurin is the most recently identified dystroglycan ligand protein and is localized in the synaptic cleft in the photoreceptor ribbon synapse. The binding between dystroglycan and pikachurin requires divalent cations. Ca^{2+} produces strongest binding; Mn^{2+} produces only faint bindings and no binding with Mg^{2+} alone. Dystroglycan has different domains that allow multiple Ca^{2+} sites to form a stable pikachurin-dystroglycan connection. This shows that pikachurin can form oligomeric structures; and suggests the possibility of clustering effects can be important in modulating pikachurin-dystroglycan interactions. Another thing to be considered is that the presence of NaCl (0.5M) strongly inhibits interaction between DG and other ligand proteins but has a modest inhibitory effect with pikachurin-DG ligand. This shows that there are differences between the binding of pikachurin-DG binding and DG binding with other proteins. Pikachurin seems to have more domains to bind with DG than other proteins. For example, experiments in ligand competition shows that presence of pikachurin inhibits laminin-111 binding with DG, but high concentrations of laminin-111 do not inhibit pikachurin binding to DG.

== Function ==
Comparison between the ribbon synapses in wild-type mice (left) and pikachurin-null mice (right)

The protein is colocalized with both dystrophin and dystroglycan at the ribbon synapses.

Pikachurin, along with laminin, perlecan, agrin, neurexin, binds to α-dystroglycan in the extracellular space. As such, pikachurin, as well as the other previously mentioned proteins, is necessary for the proper functioning of dystroglycan. Pikachurin is necessary for the apposition of presynaptic and postsynaptic termini in the ribbon synapse; deletion of pikachurin causes an abnormal electroretinogram, similarly to the deletion of nestin.

=== Ribbon synapse relation ===
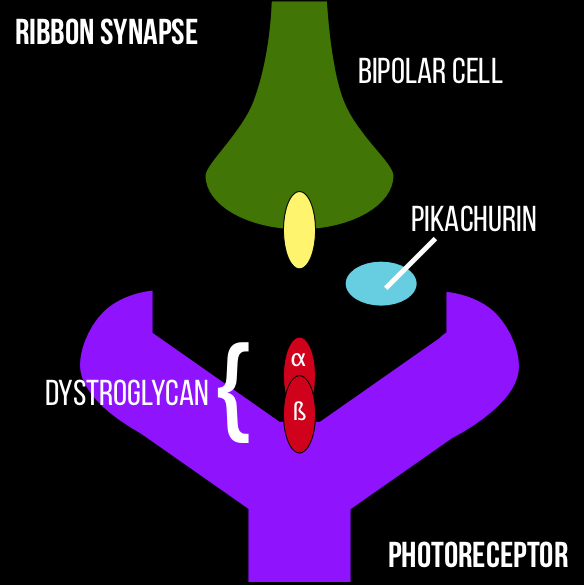
Ribbon synapse showing the position of Pikachurin

Synapse formation is crucial for the mammalian CNS (central nervous system) to function correctly. Retinal photoreceptors finish at the axon terminal which forms a specialized structure, the ribbon synapse, which specifically connects photoreceptor synaptic terminals with bipolar and horizontal cell terminals in the outer plexiform layer (OPL) of the retina. It is clear that Pikachurin, an extracellular matrix–like retinal protein, is localized to the synaptic cleft in the photoreceptor ribbon synapse. It is demonstrated that with a lack of Pikachurin, there is an improper apposition of the bipolar cell dendritic tips to the photoreceptor ribbon synapses, resulting in alterations in synaptic signal transmission and visual function. The function of Pikachurin remains unknown, but it is a fact that pikachurin is critically involved in the normal photoreceptor ribbon synapse formation and also in physiological functions of visual perception.

== Associated pathologies: muscular dystrophies ==
Congenital muscular dystrophies (CMD) such as muscle-eye-brain disease are caused by defective glycosylation of α-dystroglycan (α-DG) exhibit defective photoreceptor synaptic function. Pikachurin plays an essential role in CMD. Precise interactions between the photoreceptor ribbon synapse and the bipolar dendrites which are realized due to Pikachurin may advance our understanding of the molecular mechanisms underlying the retinal electrophysiological abnormalities observed in muscular dystrophy patients. The muscle-eye-brain dystrophy is caused by mutations in POMGnT1 or LARGE. These two genes mediated a post-translational modification on O-mannose, which is essential for pikachurin binding to dystroglycan, so people who suffer muscle-eye-disease have an hypoglycosylation of pikachurin-α-dystroglycan interactions.

== Therapeutic applications ==
Since pikachurin seems to provide better visual acuity, Sato et al. of the Osaka Bioscience Institute believe that the protein could be used to develop a treatment for retinitis pigmentosa and other eye disorders.

== See also ==
- Fibronectin type III domain
- Laminin G-like domain
- Sonic hedgehog, another protein named after a neutral video game character.
- Zbtb7, an oncogene that was originally named "Pokemon".
- Aerodactylus, a genus of pre-historic pterosaurs named after Aerodactyl, a pterosaur in the Pokémon franchise.
- Binburrum, a family of beetles of which three members were scientifically named after the Pokémon Articuno, Zapdos, and Moltres.
- Nocticola pheromosa, a cockroach named after Pheromosa.
