= POMK =

Enzyme-encoding human gene

Identifiers
- Aliases: POMK, MDDGA12, SGK196, MDDGC12, protein-O-mannose kinase, protein O-mannose kinase
- External IDs: OMIM: 615247; MGI: 1921903; GeneCards: POMK
Enzyme activity
EC #	BRENDA	ExPASy	KEGG	MetaCyc
2.7.1.183	↗	↗	↗	↗

Gene location (Human)
Chr.	Chromosome 8 (human)
Band	8p11.21	Start	43,093,498 bp
Band	8p11.21	End	43,131,180 bp

Gene location (Mouse)
Chr.	Chromosome 8 (mouse)
Band	8|8 A2	Start	26,470,632 bp
Band	8|8 A2	End	26,484,161 bp
RNA expression pattern
Bgee	Human / Mouse (ortholog); Top expressed in: paraflocculus of cerebellum; middle temporal gyrus; Brodmann area 10; frontal pole; cerebellar vermis; Brodmann area 23; middle frontal gyrus; lateral nuclear group of thalamus; entorhinal cortex; postcentral gyrus / Top expressed in: stroma of bone marrow; external carotid artery; cumulus cell; motor neuron; facial motor nucleus; interventricular septum; internal carotid artery; visual cortex; Region I of hippocampus proper; calvaria; More reference expression data
BioGPS	n/a
Gene ontology
Molecular function	nucleotide binding; protein kinase activity; phosphotransferase activity, alcohol group as acceptor; kinase activity; transferase activity; ATP binding; carbohydrate kinase activity
Cellular component	membrane; integral component of membrane; endoplasmic reticulum; endoplasmic reticulum membrane
Biological process	neuromuscular process; sensory perception of pain; phosphorylation; neuron migration; learning or memory; carbohydrate phosphorylation; brain development; protein phosphorylation; protein O-linked glycosylation
Sources:Amigo / QuickGO
Orthologs
Databases	NCBI: entry; OMA: entry
Species	Human	Mouse
Entrez	84197	74653
Ensembl	ENSG00000185900	ENSMUSG00000037251
UniProt	Q9H5K3	Q3TUA9
RefSeq (mRNA)	NM_001277971; NM_032237	NM_029037
RefSeq (protein)	NP_001264900; NP_115613	NP_083313
Location (UCSC)	Chr 8: 43.09 – 43.13 Mb	Chr 8: 26.47 – 26.48 Mb
PubMed search
- Wikidata
View/Edit Human	View/Edit Mouse

Protein O-mannose kinase is an enzyme encoded by POMK gene.

== Gene ==
POMK is located on the short arm (p) of chromosome 8 on position 11.21, from base pair 43,093,498 to base pair 43,131,180.

== Function ==
This enzyme is located in the ER, and phosphorylates mannose on M3 core of dystroglycan.

== Clinical significance ==
Mutations in this gene can cause Limb-Girdle muscular dystrophy, Muscle-eye-brain disease and Walker-Warburg syndrome.
