= RXYLT1 =

Enzyme-encoding human gene

Identifiers
- Aliases: RXYLT1, HP10481, MDDGA10, transmembrane protein 5, ribitol xylosyltransferase 1, TMEM5
- External IDs: OMIM: 605862; MGI: 2384919; GeneCards: RXYLT1
Enzyme activity
EC #	BRENDA	ExPASy	KEGG	MetaCyc
2.4.2.61	↗	↗	↗	↗

Gene location (Human)
Chr.	Chromosome 12 (human)
Band	12q14.2	Start	63,779,833 bp
Band	12q14.2	End	63,809,792 bp
RNA expression pattern
Bgee	Human / Mouse (ortholog); Top expressed in: corpus epididymis; caput epididymis; optic nerve; lactiferous duct; glutes; pericardium; tail of epididymis; renal medulla; tibia; Skeletal muscle tissue of biceps brachii / n/a; More reference expression data
BioGPS	n/a
Gene ontology
Molecular function	ribitol beta-1,4-xylosyltransferase activity; transferase activity
Cellular component	integral component of membrane; Golgi membrane; Golgi apparatus; integral component of plasma membrane; membrane; nucleoplasm
Biological process	protein glycosylation; protein O-linked mannosylation
Sources:Amigo / QuickGO
Orthologs
Databases	NCBI: entry; OMA: entry
Species	Human	Mouse
Entrez	10329	216395
Ensembl	ENSG00000118600	n/a
UniProt	Q9Y2B1	Q8VDX6
RefSeq (mRNA)	NM_001278237; NM_014254	NM_153059; NM_001364706
RefSeq (protein)	NP_001265166; NP_055069	NP_694699; NP_001351635
Location (UCSC)	Chr 12: 63.78 – 63.81 Mb	n/a
PubMed search
- Wikidata
View/Edit Human	View/Edit Mouse

Ribitol-5-phosphate xylosyltransferase is an enzyme encoded by RXYLT1 gene.

== Gene ==
RXYLT1 is located on the long arm (q) of chromosome 12 on position 14.2, from base pair 63,779,833 to base pair 63,809,792.

== Function ==
This enzyme is located in the golgi apparatus, and serves as a ribitol b1,4-xylosyltransferase for dystroglycan.

== Clinical significance ==
Mutations in this gene can cause Muscle-eye-brain disease and Walker-Warburg syndrome.
