= MEB =

MEB may refer to:

People

- Maria Elena Boschi, Italian politician
- Meb Keflezighi, American long-distance runner

Transport and places

- Line B (Rome Metro), Metropolitana B
- Essendon Airport, Melbourne, Victoria, Australia, IATA: MEB
- Laurinburg–Maxton Airport, Maxton, North Carolina, U.S., FAA LID: MEB

Other

- Marine Expeditionary Brigade
- Maneuver Enhancement Brigade, a US Army support formation that is tasked to improve the movement capabilities and rear area security for commanders at division level or higher.
- Mario Excite Bike
- Micro Enterprise Bank, see Microcredit, Microfinance
- Microscopie électronique à balayage, the French acronym for Scanning electron microscope
- Midlands Electricity Board
- Muscle-eye-brain disease
- Volkswagen Group MEB platform for electric cars by Volkswagen Group
- Ministry of National Education (Turkey) (Turkish: Milli Eğitim Bakanlığı)
