= POMGNT2 =

Identifiers
- Aliases: POMGNT2, AGO61, C3orf39, GTDC2, MDDGA8, protein O-linked mannose N-acetylglucosaminyltransferase 2 (beta 1,4-), MDDGC8
- External IDs: OMIM: 614828; MGI: 2143424; GeneCards: POMGNT2
Enzyme activity
EC #	BRENDA	ExPASy	KEGG	MetaCyc
2.4.1.312	↗	↗	↗	↗

Gene location (Human)
Chr.	Chromosome 3 (human)
Band	3p22.1	Start	43,079,229 bp
Band	3p22.1	End	43,106,085 bp

Gene location (Mouse)
Chr.	Chromosome 9 (mouse)
Band	9|9 F4	Start	121,810,672 bp
Band	9|9 F4	End	121,826,176 bp
RNA expression pattern
Bgee	Human / Mouse (ortholog); Top expressed in: lateral nuclear group of thalamus; right hemisphere of cerebellum; cardiac muscle tissue of right atrium; left uterine tube; myocardium of left ventricle; body of uterus; cerebellar vermis; prefrontal cortex; right frontal lobe; pars compacta / Top expressed in: facial motor nucleus; otolith organ; substantia nigra; utricle; ventromedial nucleus; paraventricular nucleus of hypothalamus; arcuate nucleus; nucleus of stria terminalis; dorsomedial hypothalamic nucleus; median eminence; More reference expression data
BioGPS	n/a
Gene ontology
Molecular function	transferase activity; protein O-GlcNAc transferase activity; protein binding; glycosyltransferase activity; acetylglucosaminyltransferase activity
Cellular component	integral component of membrane; endoplasmic reticulum; membrane; endoplasmic reticulum membrane
Biological process	protein glycosylation; protein O-linked glycosylation; neuron migration; protein O-linked mannosylation
Sources:Amigo / QuickGO
Orthologs
Databases	NCBI: entry; OMA: entry
Species	Human	Mouse
Entrez	84892	215494
Ensembl	ENSG00000144647	ENSMUSG00000066235
UniProt	Q8NAT1	Q8BW41
RefSeq (mRNA)	NM_032806	NM_001289558; NM_001289559; NM_001289560; NM_153540
RefSeq (protein)	NP_116195	NP_001276487; NP_001276488; NP_001276489; NP_705768; NP_001395035 NP_001395036
Location (UCSC)	Chr 3: 43.08 – 43.11 Mb	Chr 9: 121.81 – 121.83 Mb
PubMed search
- Wikidata
View/Edit Human	View/Edit Mouse

Protein O-Linked Mannose N-Acetylglucosaminyltransferase 2 is an enzyme which is encoded by the gene POMGNT2.

== Gene ==
The POMGNT2 gene is located on the short arm (p) of chromosome 3 on position 22.1, from base pair from base pair 43,079,229 to base pair 43,106,085.

== Function ==
This enzyme is located in the endoplasmic reticulum (ER), which has β-1,4-N-Acetylglucosaminyl-transferase activity on α-Dystroglycan protein.

== Clinical significance ==
Mutations in this gene causes autosomal recessive form of Limb-Girdle muscular dystrophy and Walker-Warburg syndrome.
