= Dolichyl-phosphate-mannose-protein mannosyltransferase =

Class of enzymes

dolichyl-phosphate-mannose-protein mannosyltransferase

Identifiers
- EC no.: 2.4.1.109
- CAS no.: 74315-99-4

Databases
- IntEnz: IntEnz view
- BRENDA: BRENDA entry
- ExPASy: NiceZyme view
- KEGG: KEGG entry
- MetaCyc: metabolic pathway
- PRIAM: profile
- PDB structures: RCSB PDB PDBe PDBsum
- Gene Ontology: AmiGO / QuickGO
Search
- PMC: articles
- PubMed: articles
- NCBI: proteins

In enzymology, a dolichyl-phosphate-mannose-protein mannosyltransferase (EC 2.4.1.109) is an enzyme that catalyzes the chemical reaction

dolichyl phosphate D-mannose + protein $\rightleftharpoons$ dolichyl phosphate + O-D-mannosylprotein

Thus, the two substrates of this enzyme are dolichyl phosphate D-mannose and protein, whereas its two products are dolichyl phosphate and O-D-mannosylprotein.

This enzyme belongs to the family of glycosyltransferases, specifically the hexosyltransferases. The systematic name of this enzyme class is dolichyl-phosphate-D-mannose:protein O-D-mannosyltransferase. Other names in common use include dolichol phosphomannose-protein mannosyltransferase, and protein O-D-mannosyltransferase. A human gene that codes for this enzyme is POMT1.
