= LARGE2 =

Protein-coding gene in humans

Identifiers
- Aliases: LARGE2, PP5656, GYLTL1B, glycosyltransferase-like 1B, LARGE xylosyl- and glucuronyltransferase 2
- External IDs: OMIM: 609709; MGI: 2443769; GeneCards: LARGE2

Gene location (Human)
Chr.	Chromosome 11 (human)
Band	11p11.2	Start	45,921,621 bp
Band	11p11.2	End	45,929,096 bp

Gene location (Mouse)
Chr.	Chromosome 2 (mouse)
Band	2|2 E1	Start	92,195,391 bp
Band	2|2 E1	End	92,205,214 bp
RNA expression pattern
Bgee	Human / Mouse (ortholog); Top expressed in: gonad; body of pancreas; skin of abdomen; right lobe of thyroid gland; left lobe of thyroid gland; minor salivary glands; skin of leg; placenta; anterior pituitary; skin of arm / Top expressed in: nasolacrimal duct; lip; parotid gland; tail of embryo; genital tubercle; yolk sac; vestibular membrane of cochlear duct; hair follicle; right kidney; urethra; More reference expression data
BioGPS	n/a
Gene ontology
Molecular function	transferase activity; catalytic activity; manganese ion binding; metal ion binding; xylosyltransferase activity; glycosyltransferase activity; UDP-xylosyltransferase activity; glucuronosyltransferase activity; protein binding
Cellular component	integral component of membrane; Golgi apparatus; membrane; Golgi membrane
Biological process	protein glycosylation; metabolism; protein O-linked mannosylation; muscle cell cellular homeostasis; protein O-linked glycosylation
Sources:Amigo / QuickGO
Orthologs
Databases	NCBI: entry; OMA: entry
Species	Human	Mouse
Entrez	120071	228366
Ensembl	ENSG00000165905	ENSMUSG00000040434
UniProt	Q8N3Y3	Q5XPT3
RefSeq (mRNA)	NM_001300721; NM_001300722; NM_152312	NM_001166633; NM_001290773; NM_001290774; NM_001290775; NM_172670
RefSeq (protein)	NP_001287650; NP_001287651; NP_689525	NP_001160105; NP_001277702; NP_001277703; NP_001277704; NP_766258
Location (UCSC)	Chr 11: 45.92 – 45.93 Mb	Chr 2: 92.2 – 92.21 Mb
PubMed search
- Wikidata
View/Edit Human	View/Edit Mouse

Xylosyl- and glucuronyltransferase LARGE2 is an enzyme that in humans is encoded by the LARGE2 gene (previously GYLTL1B). LARGE2 is a bifunctional glycosyltransferase which is able to act as either an alpha-1,3-xylosyltransferase or a beta-1,3-glucuronyltransferase.

== See also ==
- LARGE1
