= Fukutin-related protein =

Mammalian protein found in Homo sapiens

FKRP

Identifiers
- Aliases: FKRP, LGMD2I, MDC1C, MDDGA5, MDDGB5, MDDGC5, fukutin related protein, LGMDR9, FKTR
- External IDs: OMIM: 606596; MGI: 2447586; HomoloGene: 11513; GeneCards: FKRP; OMA:FKRP - orthologs

Gene location (Human)
Chr.	Chromosome 19 (human)
Band	19q13.32	Start	46,746,046 bp
Band	19q13.32	End	46,776,988 bp

Gene location (Mouse)
Chr.	Chromosome 7 (mouse)
Band	7|7 A2	Start	16,543,171 bp
Band	7|7 A2	End	16,550,657 bp
RNA expression pattern
Bgee	Human / Mouse (ortholog); Top expressed in: myocardium of left ventricle; cardiac muscle tissue of right atrium; muscle of thigh; sural nerve; apex of heart; gastrocnemius muscle; left uterine tube; anterior pituitary; right coronary artery; stromal cell of endometrium / Top expressed in: knee joint; medial head of gastrocnemius muscle; triceps brachii muscle; vastus lateralis muscle; skeletal muscle tissue; muscle of thigh; temporal muscle; sternocleidomastoid muscle; digastric muscle; otolith organ; More reference expression data
BioGPS	n/a
Gene ontology
Molecular function	transferase activity; dystroglycan binding
Cellular component	extracellular region; Golgi apparatus; dystrophin-associated glycoprotein complex; Golgi membrane; sarcolemma; plasma membrane; membrane; rough endoplasmic reticulum; integral component of membrane; endoplasmic reticulum; extracellular space; nucleus; cytosol; cytoplasm
Biological process	protein processing; protein O-linked mannosylation; protein glycosylation; glycoprotein biosynthetic process
Sources:Amigo / QuickGO
Orthologs
Species	Human	Mouse
Entrez	79147	243853
Ensembl	ENSG00000181027	ENSMUSG00000048920
UniProt	Q9H9S5	Q8CG64
RefSeq (mRNA)	NM_001039885; NM_024301	NM_173430; NM_001358846
RefSeq (protein)	NP_001034974; NP_077277	NP_775606; NP_001345775
Location (UCSC)	Chr 19: 46.75 – 46.78 Mb	Chr 7: 16.54 – 16.55 Mb
PubMed search
- Wikidata
View/Edit Human	View/Edit Mouse

Fukutin-related protein (FKRP) is also known as FKRP_HUMAN, LGMD2I, MDC1C, MDDGA5, MDDGB5, and MDDGC5. FKRP can be located in the brain, cardiac muscle and skeletal muscle, and in cells it is found in the Golgi apparatus. Fukutin is expressed in the mammalian retina and is located in the Golgi complex of retinal neurons.

The genomic location of the FKRP gene is on chromosome 19. FKRP is a ribitol-5-phosphate (enzyme) glycosyltransferase, which means this enzyme helps create glycosidic linkages to an acceptor. In glycosylation of α-dystroglycan (sugar chain) it adds a ribitol-5-phosphate onto the M3 core O-mannosylation of α-dystroglycan to create O-linked mannosylation. Without this linkage α-dystroglycan will not function properly, this can cause issues with the cytoskeleton, and extracellular matrix. In skeletal muscles the α-dystroglycan helps stabilize and protect muscle fibers, in the brain it directs movement of nerve cells. This could be caused by mutations that binds ribitol-5-phosphate to the α-dystroglycan incorrectly. These mutations have been found to be associated with congenital muscular dystrophy, dystroglycanopathies, and Walker-Warburg syndrome. The severity of these diseases are correlated to the amount of mutations occurring. Possible therapy options for FKRP mutations include small molecules, gene delivery, and cell therapy.

In 2024, a deep mutational scanning was conducted, which generated functional scores for all possible single nucleotide variants of the FKRP coding sequence.

== See also ==
- Fukutin
