= Fukuyama congenital muscular dystrophy =

- Other names: Congenital muscular dystrophy, Fukuyama type
- Fukuyama congenital muscular dystrophy has an autosomal recessive pattern of inheritance
- Symptoms: Seizures
- Causes: FKTN gene mutation
- Diagnostic method: Serum creatine kinase concentration and muscle biopsies
- Treatment: Physical therapy

Fukuyama congenital muscular dystrophy (FCMD) is a rare, autosomal recessive form of muscular dystrophy (weakness and breakdown of muscular tissue) mainly described in Japan but also identified in Turkish and Ashkenazi Jewish patients; fifteen cases were first described on 1960 by Dr. Yukio Fukuyama.FCMD mainly affects the brain, eyes, and muscles, in particular, the disorder affects development of the skeletal muscles leading to weakness and deformed appearances, and brain development is blunted affecting cognitive functioning as well as social skills. In 1995, the disorder was linked to mutations in a gene coding for the protein fukutin (the FCMD gene). Fukuyama congenital muscular dystrophy is the second most prevalent form of muscular dystrophy in Japan. One out of every 90 people in Japan is a heterozygous carrier.

== Symptoms and signs ==
In terms of the signs/symptoms of Fukuyama congenital muscular dystrophy it is characterized by a decrease in skeletal muscle tone as well as an impairment in brain and eye development. Initial symptoms of FCMD present in early infancy as decreased ability to feed. Marked differences in facial appearance occur due to decreased muscle tone. Further characteristics include:

- Seizures
- Delay in development
- Cardiac issues
- Swallowing difficulty
- Neurological problems

Fukuyama congenital muscular dystrophy also affects the nervous system and various associated parts. FCMD affects normal development of the brain producing a broadly smooth, bumpy shaped cortex named cobblestone lissencephaly as well as various other malformations, notably micropolygyria. Children also experience delayed myelination in the brain.

== Cause ==
CHR 9

The cause of Fukuyama congenital muscular dystrophy is rooted in the FKTN gene, located at human chromosome 9q31, encoding the protein fukutin. Mutations in this gene, and therefore the fukutin protein, are the cause of FCMD. The disease is inherited in an autosomal recessive manner.

This means the defective gene responsible for the disorder is located on an autosome (chromosome 9 is an autosome), and two copies of the defective gene (one inherited from each parent) are required in order to be born with the disorder. The parents of an individual with an autosomal recessive disorder both carry one copy of the defective gene but usually do not experience any signs or symptoms of the disorder.

Two mutations have been identified. The first and most common is an SVA retrotransposal insertion in the 3'-untranslated region. The second is a deep-intronic point mutation c.647+2084G>T. This second mutation has only been found to date in the presence of the first mutation.

== Pathophysiology ==
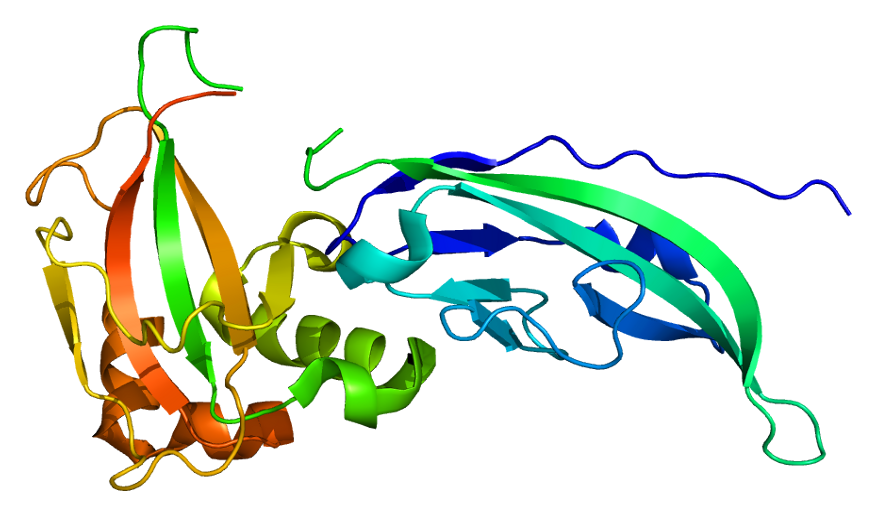
Protein DAG1

The mechanism of this sub-type of muscular dystrophy consists of a mutation in the FKTN gene which results in a malformed fukutin protein. It is thought that fukutin modifies the alpha-dystroglycan protein, which is important in anchoring cells to certain molecules, specifically including some proteins. Alpha-dystroglycan in skeletal muscles helps to prevent the breakdown of muscle fibers through stabilization and protection. Alpha-dystroglycan also helps brain development by assisting in the migration of neurons. Most frequently, FKTN is mutated in such a way that creates a shortage of fukutin in the cell, which in turn creates problems during formation of alpha-dystroglycan leading to less stabilization of muscle cells. Use of the destabilized muscle fibers over time causes them to break down and a gradual decline in muscle tone and atrophy of muscle fibers occurs. The decline in cerebral fukutin causes neuronal cells to continue moving beyond their intended destination. Additionally, oxidative stress has some effect on astrocytes (as well as, neurons) when fukutin is subdued.

== Diagnosis ==
Serum creatine kinase concentration and muscle biopsies can be obtained to help determine if the individual has FMCD. FKTN molecular genetic testing is used to determine a mutation in the FKTN gene after a serum creatine kinase concentration, muscle biopsies, and/or MRI imaging have presented abnormalities indicative of FCMD, the presence of the symptoms indicates Fukuyama congenital muscular dystrophy. The available genetic test include:

- Linkage analysis
- Deletion analysis
- Sequence analysis - exons
- Sequence analysis - entire coding region

== Treatment ==
Currently this sub-type of muscular dystrophy has no cure and no definitive treatment exists. Treatment offers preventative tactics to delay muscle breakdown and increase life expectancy. Stretching and physical therapy can increase mobility. Treatment also includes correcting skeletal abnormalities through orthopedic surgery and other orthopedic techniques. Antiepileptic medication is administered to help prevent seizures. ACE inhibitors and beta blockers help treat heart conditions, and respiratory assistance is more than likely needed at some point for the affected individual.

== Prognosis ==
Fukuyama congenital muscular dystrophy has a poor prognosis. Most children with FCMD reach a maximum mobility at sitting upright and sliding. Due to the compounded effects of continually worsening heart problems, impaired mental development, problems swallowing and additional complications, children with FCMD rarely live through adolescence, the disorder proves fatal by age 20.

== See also ==
- Congenital muscular dystrophy
