= B3GALNT2 =

Protein-coding gene in humans

Identifiers
- Aliases: B3GALNT2, B3GalNAc-T2, MDDGA11, beta-1,3-N-acetylgalactosaminyltransferase 2
- External IDs: OMIM: 610194; MGI: 2145517; GeneCards: B3GALNT2
Enzyme activity
EC #	BRENDA	ExPASy	KEGG	MetaCyc
2.4.1.313	↗	↗	↗	↗

Gene location (Human)
Chr.	Chromosome 1 (human)
Band	1q42.3	Start	235,447,190 bp
Band	1q42.3	End	235,504,452 bp

Gene location (Mouse)
Chr.	Chromosome 13 (mouse)
Band	13|13 A1	Start	14,129,054 bp
Band	13|13 A1	End	14,173,688 bp
RNA expression pattern
Bgee	Human / Mouse (ortholog); Top expressed in: body of pancreas; skeletal muscle tissue; muscle of thigh; gastrocnemius muscle; popliteal artery; tibial arteries; stromal cell of endometrium; testicle; right coronary artery; smooth muscle tissue / Top expressed in: triceps brachii muscle; vastus lateralis muscle; Rostral migratory stream; intercostal muscle; sternocleidomastoid muscle; temporal muscle; tail of embryo; muscle of thigh; secondary oocyte; genital tubercle; More reference expression data
BioGPS	n/a
Gene ontology
Molecular function	transferase activity; acetylglucosaminyltransferase activity; galactosyltransferase activity; glycosyltransferase activity; acetylgalactosaminyltransferase activity
Cellular component	integral component of membrane; Golgi membrane; Golgi apparatus; endoplasmic reticulum; membrane; endoplasmic reticulum membrane
Biological process	protein glycosylation; protein O-linked glycosylation
Sources:Amigo / QuickGO
Orthologs
Databases	NCBI: entry; OMA: entry
Species	Human	Mouse
Entrez	148789	97884
Ensembl	ENSG00000282880; ENSG00000162885	ENSMUSG00000039242
UniProt	Q8NCR0	Q8BG28
RefSeq (mRNA)	NM_001277155; NM_152490	NM_178640; NM_001362404; NM_001362405
RefSeq (protein)	NP_001264084; NP_689703	NP_848755; NP_001349333; NP_001349334
Location (UCSC)	Chr 1: 235.45 – 235.5 Mb	Chr 13: 14.13 – 14.17 Mb
PubMed search
- Wikidata
View/Edit Human	View/Edit Mouse

Beta-1,3-N-acetylgalactosaminyltransferase 2 is a protein that in humans is encoded by the B3GALNT2 gene.

== Function ==
This gene encodes a member of the glycosyltransferase 31 family. The encoded protein synthesizes GalNAc:beta-1,3GlcNAc, a novel carbohydrate structure, on N- and O-glycans. Alternatively spliced transcript variants that encode different isoforms have been described. [provided by RefSeq, Mar 2013].

== Clinical significance ==
A mutation in B3GALNT2 is known to cause dystroglycanopathy congenital with brain and eye anomalies A11 (MDDGA11), which is an autosomal recessive muscular dystrophy.
