= Fukutin =

FKTN

Identifiers
- Aliases: FKTN, CMD1X, FCMD, LGMD2M, MDDGA4, MDDGB4, MDDGC4, fukutin, LGMDR13
- External IDs: OMIM: 607440; MGI: 2179507; GeneCards: FKTN

Gene location (Human)
Chr.	Chromosome 9 (human)
Band	9q31.2	Start	105,558,122 bp
Band	9q31.2	End	105,653,820 bp

Gene location (Mouse)
Chr.	Chromosome 4 (mouse)
Band	4 B2|4 28.74 cM	Start	53,713,998 bp
Band	4 B2|4 28.74 cM	End	53,777,890 bp
RNA expression pattern
Bgee	Human / Mouse (ortholog); Top expressed in: Achilles tendon; germinal epithelium; testicle; ventricular zone; skin of hip; Region I of hippocampus proper; mucosa of paranasal sinus; stromal cell of endometrium; body of pancreas; corpus callosum / Top expressed in: epithelium of lens; seminal vesicula; Rostral migratory stream; Epithelium of choroid plexus; interventricular septum; trigeminal ganglion; olfactory epithelium; spermatocyte; vestibular membrane of cochlear duct; substantia nigra; More reference expression data
BioGPS	n/a
Gene ontology
Molecular function	transferase activity; protein binding
Cellular component	integral component of membrane; Golgi membrane; cis-Golgi network; Golgi apparatus; endoplasmic reticulum; nucleus; membrane; extracellular space; integral component of Golgi membrane; cytoplasm
Biological process	negative regulation of JNK cascade; protein glycosylation; muscle organ development; protein O-linked mannosylation; regulation of protein glycosylation; nervous system development; negative regulation of cell population proliferation; protein O-linked glycosylation
Sources:Amigo / QuickGO
Orthologs
Databases	NCBI: entry; OMA: entry
Species	Human	Mouse
Entrez	2218	246179
Ensembl	ENSG00000106692	ENSMUSG00000028414
UniProt	O75072	Q8R507
RefSeq (mRNA)	NM_001079802; NM_001198963; NM_006731; NM_001351496; NM_001351497 NM_001351498; NM_001351499; NM_001351500; NM_001351501; NM_001351502	NM_139309; NM_001363126; NM_001363127; NM_001363128
RefSeq (protein)	NP_001073270; NP_001185892; NP_006722; NP_001338425; NP_001338426 NP_001338427; NP_001338428; NP_001338429; NP_001338430; NP_001338431	NP_647470; NP_001350055; NP_001350056; NP_001350057
Location (UCSC)	Chr 9: 105.56 – 105.65 Mb	Chr 4: 53.71 – 53.78 Mb
PubMed search
- Wikidata
View/Edit Human	View/Edit Mouse

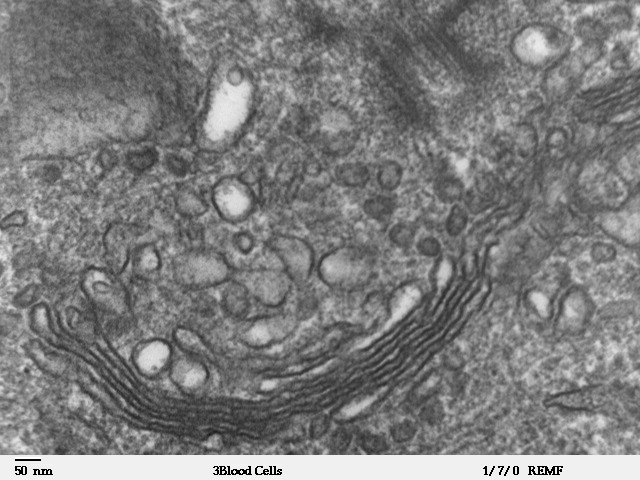
Golgi apparatus where Fukutin proteins function and inhabit

Fukutin is a protein that in humans is encoded by the FKTN gene. It is necessary for the maintenance of muscle integrity, cortical histogenesis, and normal ocular development. In humans this protein is encoded by the FCMD gene (also named FKTN), located on chromosome 9q31. The FKTN gene encodes a type II transmembrane protein that is central to the Golgi apparatus through an N- terminal signal anchor. Fukutin is a crucial enzyme involved in modifying proteins, particularly alpha- dystroglycan, which links the cell's internal structure to the outside matrix, vital for muscle and brain health. It is suggested that Fukutin may be located in the extracellular matrix, where it interacts with a large complex encompassing both the inside and outside of muscle membranes.

== Discovery ==
Fukutin (encoded by the FKTN gene) was discovered by two Japanese researchers, Kazuhiro Kobayashi and Tatsushi Toda, who liked the FKTN gene to Fukuyama congenital muscular dystrophy in 1998. The protein was identified through positional cloning to find the gene responsible for Fukuyama congenital muscular dystrophy, a severe muscle disorder common in Japan. Researchers found the gene after linking it to chromosome 9q13, realizing mutations in FKTN caused the disease, leading to hypoglycosylation of alpha- dystroglycan and resulting in muscle weakness, brain defects and eye problems. They found that the FKTN gene provides instructions for Fukutin, a 461 amino acid protein. The discovery of Fukutin marked a major step forward in science towards understanding dystroglycanopathies.

In 2000, Atsuo Sasaki used Northern blot and RT-PCR analysis to determine that the fukutin gene is expressed at similar levels in both the fetal and mature brain, however, it is found to be dramatically reduced in brains with Fukuyama congenital muscular dystrophy (FCMD). In the FCMD brain, neurons in areas with no dysplasia show moderate expression while transcripts were undetectable in the over-migrated dysplastic region. The authors hypothesized that fukutin may influence neuronal migration itself rather than formation of the basement membrane.

Later on in 2004 and 2005, researchers Hiroki Kurahashi and Takeshi Chiyonobu published their work on the Fukutin gene and its role in muscular dystrophy. They are co- authors on research papers that investigate the physiological function and pathological roles of Fukutin. Kurahashi and Chiyonobu conducted research involving mice to understand the function of Fukutin, their work established crucial mouse models for the study of dystroglycanpathies. Early research demonstrated that complete Fukutin knockout in mice resulted in embryonic lethality, primarily due to fragile basement membranes. Analysis of fukutin- deficient chimeric mice revealed that defects in the basal lamina, caused by the loss of normal alpha- dystroglycan glycosylation, are key to brain malformations as seen in Fukuyama- type congenital muscular dystrophy. This concludes that fukutin is necessary for the maintenance of muscle strength, cortical histogenesis, and normal ocular development, and suggests linkage in function between fukutin and alpha- dystroglycan.

== Subcellular distribution ==
Fukutin is distributed to Golgi apparatus, the cell;s protein modification factory, adding sugars to other proteins.

== Function ==
Although its function is mostly unknown, Fukutin is a putative transmembrane protein that is ubiquitously expressed, although at higher levels in skeletal muscle, heart and brain. It is localized to the cis-Golgi compartment, where it may be involved in the glycosylation of α-dystroglycan in skeletal muscle. During glycosylation, fukutin adds sugar molecules, specifically ribitol phosphate to alpha-dystroglycan. This process may help anchor the cell's cytoskeleton to the extracellular matrix, stabilizing muscle fibers and preventing muscle corruption.

The encoded protein is thought to be a glycosyltransferase and could play a role in brain development. Fukutin is also vital for normal cortical development and neuronal functions, with expression in neurons and glial cells. Taken together, fukutin and α-DG are closely related in mature and immature human nerve cells in vivo, such as skeletal muscles and astrocytes. Fukutin may participate in basement membrane formation, synaptic function and neuronal migration in response to the glycosylation of α-DG. This may infer that fukutin may hold other functions relating to cellular differentiation. Fukutin is expressed in the mammalian retina and is located in the Golgi complex of retinal neurons. Fukutin may also play a role in cell proliferation and survival and gene transcription by enhancing cyclin D1 expression by forming a complex with AP-1 where Fukutin may serve as a potential co- factor for AP-1 as well.

Research indicates fukutin might play a role in the presynaptic terminal of gamma-aminobutyric acid neurotransmitters (GABAergic). Fukutin works with glutamate decarboxylase (GAD), an enzyme that synthesizes the neurotransmitter of gamma- aminobutyric acid and synaptophysin. A loss of fukutin appears to increase glutamate decarboxylase expression, suggesting its involvement in regulating neurotransmitter release. These functions are considered unexpected properties of fukutin, distinct from its primary role in protein glycosylation.

== Structure ==
Fukutin features a primary sequence of 461 amino acids that fold into secondary (alpha helices/ beta- sheets) and a specific 3D tertiary structure, often forming tetramers (quaternary structure) with other proteins. Fukutins also feature transmembrane regions and a catalytic domain important for adding sugar chains, such as Ribitol, to proteins such as alpha- dystroglycan. The secondary structure of alpha helices and beta sheets provides stability to the protein while a complex 3D shape in the tertiary structure allows it to function, potentially with stable metal ion (Mg2+) binding sites. Regarding domains of Fukutin, the protein is predicted to have a transmembrane region, a stem region, and a catalytic domain, similar to other glycosyltransferases. Fukutin has a predicted molecular mass of 53.7 kDa.

Fukutin's transmembrane domain is a stable helix which is not affected by the width of the local membrane. Instead, this protein responds to changes in bilayer thickness using its ample mobility and ability to tilt within the bilayer. As the fukutin helix tilts, it is considered to be a function of bilayer thicken and shows implications for how the protein may respond to a variety of bilayer compositions found within the different intracellular compartments. This habit may suggest implications for protein packing and the formation of higher oligomeric structures, including the helix's preference for proteins to associate themselves with lipid bilayers with distinct physical properties.

== Clinical significance ==
Defects in this gene are a cause of Fukuyama congenital muscular dystrophy, Walker-Warburg syndrome, limb-girdle muscular dystrophy type 2M (LGMD2M), and dilated cardiomyopathy type 1X (CMD1X). Fukutin and Fukutin- Related Protein are closely related glycosyltransferases who both work together to develop Fukutin gene therapies that aim to treat muscular dystrophies, including Limb- Girdle Muscular Dystrophy Type 2I/R9 (LGMD2I/R9), Walker-Warburg Syndrome and Fukuyama congenital muscular dystrophy.

Fukutin gene therapy uses viral vectors, mainly adenoids- associated viruses, to deliver healthy copy of the fukutin gene into patients with muscular dystrophies caused by Fukutin Related Protein (FKRP) mutations, aiming to restore proper alpha- dystroglycan glycosylation, showing promise in improving strength, reducing muscle damage, and lower CK levels. While still being researched, Fukutin may also act as a tumor suppressor, inhibiting cell proliferation in cancers like astrocytoma and uterine cervical cancer. Fukutin may accomplish this by interacting with transcription factors such as AP-1 to regulate cell cycle genes. Fukutin cell suppression refers to its role in suppressing uncontrolled cell growth by slowing cell division, a function distinct from its primary glycosylation role. Fukutin binds to the promoter of the cell cycle gene, Cyclin D1, reducing its expression which slows cell cycle progression. Suppressing fukutin increases cell proliferation, making it a potential target for cancer therapy.

Researchers are also investigating RNA interference (RNAi) to correct genetic defects in the fukutin (FKTN) gene, using experimental techniques such as exon skipping by antisense oligonucleotides (ASOs) delivered via AAV vectors to silence faulty gene messages and restore protein function. By correcting the mistake in the fukutin gene that blocks the chemical glycosylation of a biologically important protein, the cell can produce functional fukutin protein, restoring normal biochemical processes, researchers showed in patient- derived cell.

=== Neurodegeneration ===
Fukutin is believed to be involved in the phosphorylation of tau protein. It is suggested that Fukutin, tau proteins, and glycogen synthase kinase- 3β (GSK-3β), form a complex. Suppression of fukutin leads to increased phosphorylation of both tau and glycogen synthase kinase-3β, while over- expression reduces it. This suggests that fukutin typically helps suppress tau phosphorylation, its absence or malfunction may contribute to the accumulation of abnormal hyperphosphorylated tau, which forms neurofibrillary tangles.

=== Other disorders ===
A lack of functional fukutin protein caused by genetic mutations in the fukutin gene may lead to a spectrum of conditions called FKTN- related disorders or also known as dystroglycanopathies. These are severe, muscular dystrophies that often affect the muscles, brain and eyes. Mutations in the fukutin gene have been shown to result in Fukuyama congenital muscular dystrophy characterized by brain malformation which is one of the most common autosomal-recessive disorders in Japan. The range of these conditions can vary from the mildest form, Limb- girdle muscular dystrophy type 2M (LGMD2M), to the most severe, Walker-Warburg syndrome.

A deficiency in the Fukutin enzyme results in defective α- dystroglycan, leading to a multitude of consequences. The body's muscle fibers become weak and damaged during activity and begins to degenerate over time, leading to total muscle weakness. Defective α- dystroglycan affects the migration of neurons in the body's brain during early development which can cause structural defects like a bumpy, irregular brain surface, formally known as "cobblestone lissencephaly" or "polymicrogyria". This development can eventually lead to intellectual disabilities, developmental delays and seizures Absence of Fukutin can also leave an individual's vision impaired, such as small eyes, cataracts, and tractional retinal detachment. Lack of fukutin can also cause an individual to develop heart and respiratory issues. Progressive heart conditions, cardiomyopathy, and respiratory muscle weakness, which can lead to frequent lung infections, are common in more severe and advanced cases and can often cause a shortened life span.

== See also ==
- Fukutin-related protein
