= Beta-1,4-glucuronyltransferase 1 =

Protein-coding gene in the species Homo sapiens

B4GAT1

Identifiers
- Aliases: B4GAT1, B3GN-T1, B3GNT6, BETA3GNTI, MDDGA13, iGAT, iGNT, B3GNT1, beta-1,4-glucuronyltransferase 1
- External IDs: OMIM: 605517; MGI: 1919680; GeneCards: B4GAT1

Gene location (Human)
Chr.	Chromosome 11 (human)
Band	11q13.2	Start	66,345,374 bp
Band	11q13.2	End	66,347,629 bp

Gene location (Mouse)
Chr.	Chromosome 19 (mouse)
Band	19|19 A	Start	5,088,854 bp
Band	19|19 A	End	5,091,159 bp
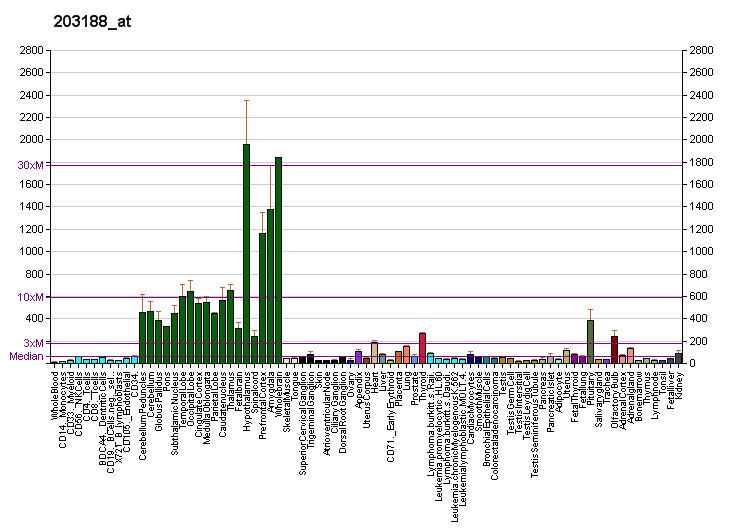
RNA expression pattern
Bgee	Human / Mouse (ortholog); Top expressed in: endothelial cell; middle temporal gyrus; pons; lateral nuclear group of thalamus; superior vestibular nucleus; prefrontal cortex; Brodmann area 23; Brodmann area 9; pars compacta; superior frontal gyrus / Top expressed in: hypothalamus; striatum of neuraxis; hippocampus proper; superior frontal gyrus; primary visual cortex; proximal tubule; right kidney; cerebellar cortex; dentate gyrus of hippocampal formation granule cell; mesencephalon; More reference expression data
BioGPS	More reference expression data
Gene ontology
Molecular function	transferase activity; glucuronosyltransferase activity; metal ion binding; glycosyltransferase activity; N-acetyllactosaminide beta-1,3-N-acetylglucosaminyltransferase activity; protein binding
Cellular component	integral component of membrane; integral component of Golgi membrane; Golgi membrane; Golgi apparatus; extracellular exosome; membrane
Biological process	protein glycosylation; poly-N-acetyllactosamine biosynthetic process; keratan sulfate biosynthetic process; protein O-linked mannosylation; axon guidance; protein O-linked glycosylation
Sources:Amigo / QuickGO
Orthologs
Databases	NCBI: entry; OMA: entry
Species	Human	Mouse
Entrez	11041	108902
Ensembl	ENSG00000174684	ENSMUSG00000047379
UniProt	O43505	Q8BWP8
RefSeq (mRNA)	NM_006876	NM_175383
RefSeq (protein)	NP_006867	NP_780592
Location (UCSC)	Chr 11: 66.35 – 66.35 Mb	Chr 19: 5.09 – 5.09 Mb
PubMed search
- Wikidata
View/Edit Human	View/Edit Mouse

Beta-1,4-glucuronyltransferase 1 is an enzyme that, in humans, is encoded by the B4GAT1 gene (originally erroneously denoted B3GNT1).

== β-1,4-glucuronyltransferase ==
The B4GAT1 gene encodes a β-1,4-glucuronyltransferase, that transfers glucuronic acid towards both α- and β-anomers of xylose. B4GAT1 is the priming enzyme for LARGE, a dual-activity glycosyltransferase that is capable of extending products of B4GAT1. Thus, B4GAT1 is involved in the initiation of the LARGE-dependent repeating disaccharide that is necessary for extracellular matrix protein binding to O-mannosylated α-dystroglycan that is lacking in secondary dystroglycanopathies.

== Misidentification ==
The B4GAT1 gene was first reported to encode a member of the beta-1,3-N-acetylglucosaminyltransferase family and thought to be responsible for the synthesis of poly-N-acetyllactosamine, a determinant for the blood group i antigen. Thus, it was also known as iGNT.
