= GMPPB =

Identifiers
- Aliases: GMPPB, MDDGA14, MDDGB14, MDDGC14, GDP-mannose pyrophosphorylase B, LGMDR19
- External IDs: OMIM: 615320; MGI: 2660880; HomoloGene: 5578; GeneCards: GMPPB; OMA:GMPPB - orthologs

Gene location (Mouse)
Chr.	Chromosome 9 (mouse)
Band	9|9 F1	Start	107,926,441 bp
Band	9|9 F1	End	107,930,000 bp
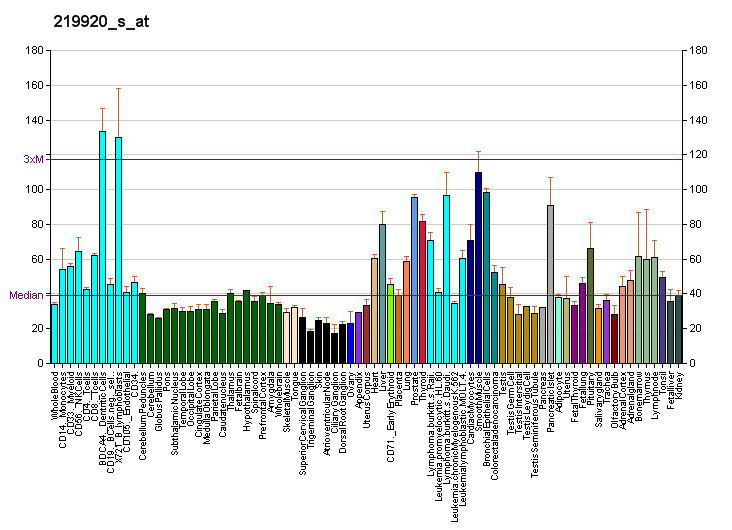
RNA expression pattern
Bgee	Human / Mouse (ortholog); Top expressed in: body of pancreas; anterior pituitary; bone marrow cells; right lobe of thyroid gland; minor salivary glands; right lobe of liver; left lobe of thyroid gland; right adrenal gland; left adrenal gland; body of stomach / Top expressed in: epithelium of small intestine; intestinal villus; Ileal epithelium; jejunum; duodenum; islet of Langerhans; spermatid; proximal tubule; placenta; colon; More reference expression data
BioGPS	More reference expression data
Gene ontology
Molecular function	transferase activity; mannose-1-phosphate guanylyltransferase activity; nucleotide binding; nucleotidyltransferase activity; GTP binding; protein binding
Cellular component	cytoplasm
Biological process	biosynthesis; GDP-mannose biosynthetic process
Sources:Amigo / QuickGO
Orthologs
Species	Human	Mouse
Entrez	29925	331026
Ensembl	n/a	ENSMUSG00000070284
UniProt	Q9Y5P6	Q8BTZ7
RefSeq (mRNA)	NM_021971; NM_013334	NM_177910; NM_001357682
RefSeq (protein)	NP_037466; NP_068806	NP_808578; NP_001344611
Location (UCSC)	n/a	Chr 9: 107.93 – 107.93 Mb
PubMed search
- Wikidata
View/Edit Human	View/Edit Mouse

Mannose-1-phosphate guanyltransferase beta is an enzyme that in humans is encoded by the GMPPB gene.

This gene is thought to encode a GDP-mannose pyrophosphorylase. This enzyme catalyzes the reaction which converts mannose-1-phosphate and GTP to GDP-mannose which is involved in the production of N-linked oligosaccharides. The gene encodes two transcript variants.
