= POMT2 =

Mammalian protein found in Homo sapiens

Identifiers
- Aliases: POMT2, LGMD2N, MDDGA2, MDDGB2, MDDGC2, protein O-mannosyltransferase 2, LGMDR14
- External IDs: OMIM: 607439; MGI: 2444430; GeneCards: POMT2
Enzyme activity
| EC # | BRENDA | ExPASy | KEGG | MetaCyc |
|---|---|---|---|---|
| 2.4.1.109 | ↗ | ↗ | ↗ | ↗ |

Gene location (Human)
| Chr. | Chromosome 14 (human) |
| Band | 14q24.3 | Start | 77,274,956 bp |
| Band | 14q24.3 | End | 77,320,883 bp |

Gene location (Mouse)
| Chr. | Chromosome 12 (mouse) |
| Band | 12|12 D2 | Start | 87,153,635 bp |
| Band | 12|12 D2 | End | 87,194,742 bp |
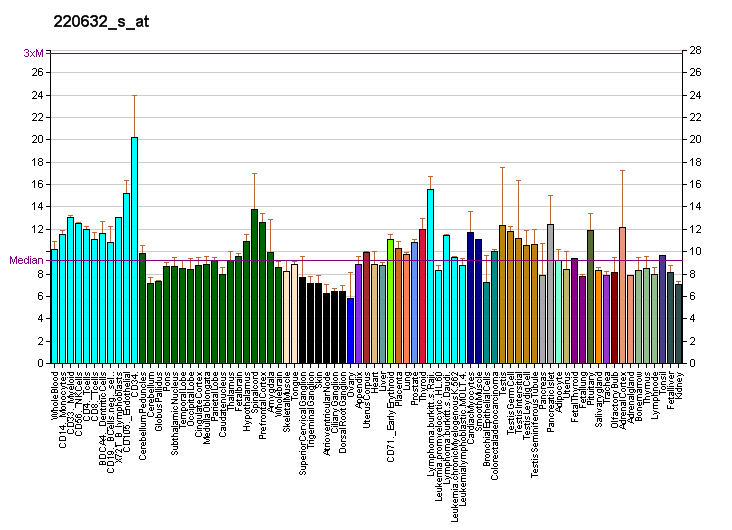
RNA expression pattern
| Bgee | Human / Mouse (ortholog); Top expressed in: right testis; left testis; right lobe of thyroid gland; anterior pituitary; left lobe of thyroid gland; stromal cell of endometrium; ventricular zone; right adrenal cortex; olfactory zone of nasal mucosa; left adrenal cortex / Top expressed in: spermatid; spermatocyte; posterior nasal aperture; seminiferous tubule; lesser wing of sphenoid bone; mandible; right kidney; tail of embryo; neural layer of retina; proximal tubule; More reference expression data |
| BioGPS | More reference expression data |
Gene ontology
| Molecular function | glycosyltransferase activity; dolichyl-phosphate-mannose-protein mannosyltransferase activity; transferase activity; mannosyltransferase activity; metal ion binding |
| Cellular component | integral component of membrane; endoplasmic reticulum; membrane; endoplasmic reticulum membrane |
| Biological process | protein O-linked glycosylation; protein O-linked mannosylation; ER-associated misfolded protein catabolic process; mannosylation; positive regulation of protein O-linked glycosylation; protein glycosylation |
Sources:Amigo / QuickGO
Orthologs
| Databases | NCBI: entry; OMA: entry |
| Species | Human | Mouse |
| Entrez | 29954 | 217734 |
| Ensembl | ENSG00000009830 | ENSMUSG00000034126 |
| UniProt | Q9UKY4 | Q8BGQ4 |
| RefSeq (mRNA) | NM_013382 | NM_153415 |
| RefSeq (protein) | NP_037514 | NP_700464 |
| Location (UCSC) | Chr 14: 77.27 – 77.32 Mb | Chr 12: 87.15 – 87.19 Mb |
| PubMed search |
- Wikidata
| View/Edit Human | View/Edit Mouse |

Protein O-mannosyl-transferase 2 is an enzyme that in humans is encoded by the POMT2 gene.

== Function ==
POMT2 encodes an integral membrane protein of the endoplasmic reticulum (ER) that shares significant sequence similarity with a family of protein O-mannosyltransferases of S. cerevisiae. For additional background information, see POMT1 (MIM 607423).[supplied by OMIM]

The POMT2 gene encodes for an enzyme called protein o-mannosyltransferase 2. This enzyme is responsible for α-dystroglycan glycosylation, an essential post-translational protein modification that allows cell surface membrane proteins to attach to the surrounding extracellular matrix. This post-translational process is especially important in muscle cells, and POMT2 variants have been directly associated with the development of various muscular dystrophies. Recently, researchers have identified POMT2 variations in patients suffering from a rare muscular dystrophy called limb-girdle muscular dystrophy R14. In other species, it is hypothesized that POMT2 missense substitution mutations play a role in hypoxia adaptations for hibernating mammals. Hibernation is associated with many physiological and metabolic changes, including long term slower breathing rates which can pose a potential physiological stressor. To compensate for this, hibernating mammals possess genes that help them survive in low-oxygen environments for long periods of time. One of these genes is the POMT2 gene. The mechanism by which this gene codes for hypoxia adaptations has yet to be fully understood, however through close genetic and phylogenetic analysis, five different hibernating mammals have been shown to possess this beneficial mutation.
