= POMT1 =

Mammalian protein found in Homo sapiens

Identifiers
- Aliases: POMT1, LGMD2K, MDDGA1, MDDGB1, MDDGC1, RT, protein O-mannosyltransferase 1
- External IDs: OMIM: 607423; MGI: 2138994; GeneCards: POMT1
Enzyme activity
EC #	BRENDA	ExPASy	KEGG	MetaCyc
2.4.1.109	↗	↗	↗	↗

Gene location (Mouse)
Chr.	Chromosome 2 (mouse)
Band	2|2 B	Start	32,236,590 bp
Band	2|2 B	End	32,255,005 bp
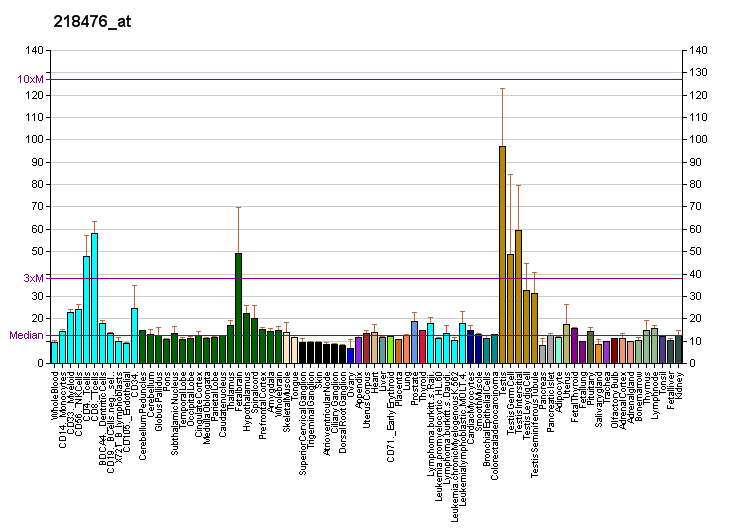
RNA expression pattern
Bgee	Human / Mouse (ortholog); n/a / Top expressed in: spermatocyte; spermatid; seminiferous tubule; crypt of lieberkuhn of small intestine; brown adipose tissue; proximal tubule; masseter muscle; neural layer of retina; right kidney; intercostal muscle
BioGPS	More reference expression data
Gene ontology
Molecular function	glycosyltransferase activity; dolichyl-phosphate-mannose-protein mannosyltransferase activity; transferase activity; mannosyltransferase activity; metal ion binding
Cellular component	integral component of membrane; acrosomal vesicle; endoplasmic reticulum; sarcoplasmic reticulum; membrane; endoplasmic reticulum membrane
Biological process	multicellular organism development; protein glycosylation; protein O-linked glycosylation; extracellular matrix organization; protein O-linked mannosylation; ER-associated misfolded protein catabolic process; mannosylation; positive regulation of protein O-linked glycosylation; carbohydrate metabolic process
Sources:Amigo / QuickGO
Orthologs
Databases	NCBI: entry; OMA: entry
Species	Human	Mouse
Entrez	10585	99011
Ensembl	ENSG00000130714	ENSMUSG00000039254
UniProt	Q9Y6A1; Q5JT04	Q8R2R1
RefSeq (mRNA)	NM_001077365; NM_001077366; NM_001136113; NM_001136114; NM_007171	NM_145145
RefSeq (protein)	NP_001070833; NP_001070834; NP_001129585; NP_001129586; NP_009102 NP_001340122; NP_001340123; NP_001340124; NP_001340125; NP_001340126; NP_001340127; NP_001340128; NP_001340129; NP_001361618; NP_001361619; NP_001361620; NP_001361621; NP_001361622; NP_001361624	NP_660127
Location (UCSC)	n/a	Chr 2: 32.24 – 32.26 Mb
PubMed search
- Wikidata
View/Edit Human	View/Edit Mouse

Protein O-mannosyl-transferase 1 is an enzyme that in humans is encoded by the POMT1 gene. It is a member of the dolichyl-phosphate-mannose-protein mannosyltransferases.

== Function ==
O-mannosylation is an important protein modification in eukaryotes that is initiated by an evolutionarily conserved family of protein O-mannosyltransferases. POMT1 shares sequence similarity with protein O-mannosyltransferases of S. cerevisiae. In yeast, these enzymes are located in the endoplasmic reticulum (ER) and are required for cell integrity and cell wall rigidity. POMT1 also shows similarity to the Drosophila 'rotated abdomen' (rt) gene, which when mutated causes defects in myogenesis and muscle structure.[supplied by OMIM]

It is associated with limb-girdle muscular dystrophy type LGMD2K.

In the retina it is known that O-mannosylation of α-DG carried out by POMT1 is crucial for the establishment of proper synapses at the outer plexiform layer and the transmission of visual information from cones and rods to their postsynaptic neurons, i.e. bipolar and horizontal cells. Lack of POMT1 expression results in a good number of impairments in photoreceptors that have been documented at the proteomic, morphological and physiological levels.
