= LARGE =

Human enzyme present in the golgi body

LARGE1

Identifiers
- Aliases: LARGE1, MDC1D, MDDGA6, MDDGB6, LARGE, like-glycosyltransferase, LARGE xylosyl- and glucuronyltransferase 1
- External IDs: OMIM: 603590; MGI: 1342270; GeneCards: LARGE1

Gene location (Human)
Chr.	Chromosome 22 (human)
Band	22q12.3	Start	33,162,226 bp
Band	22q12.3	End	33,922,841 bp

Gene location (Mouse)
Chr.	Chromosome 8 (mouse)
Band	8 B3.3|8 35.08 cM	Start	73,541,227 bp
Band	8 B3.3|8 35.08 cM	End	74,080,168 bp
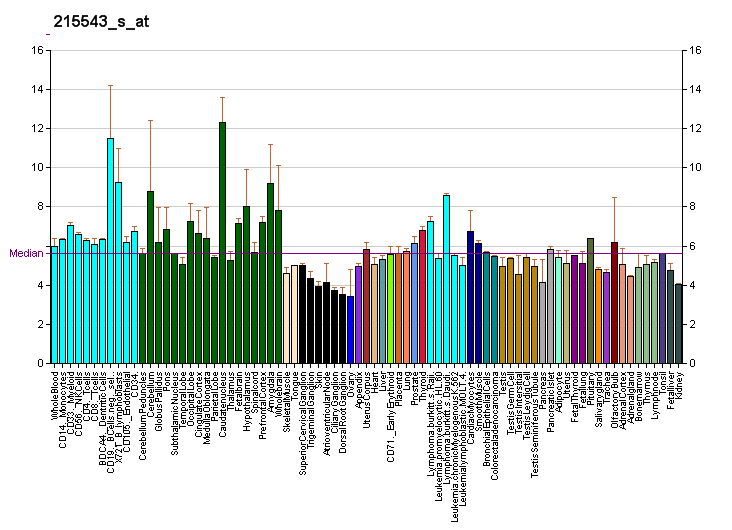

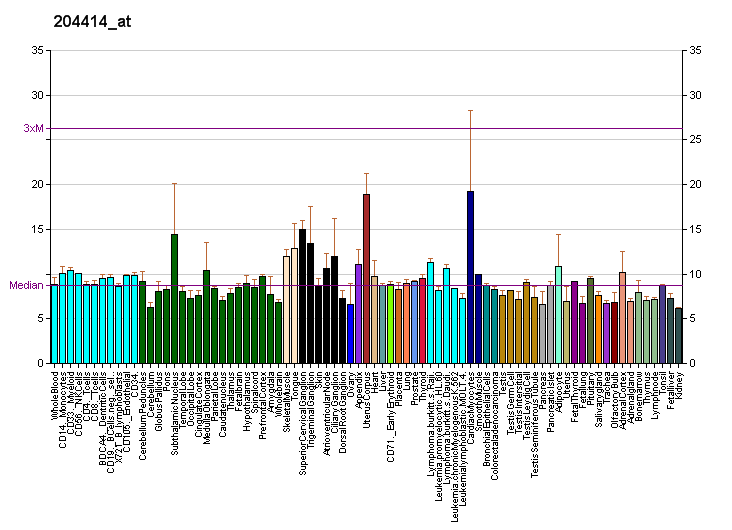
RNA expression pattern
Bgee	Human / Mouse (ortholog); Top expressed in: left ventricle; apex of heart; myocardium of left ventricle; gastrocnemius muscle; prefrontal cortex; right auricle of heart; right ventricle; stromal cell of endometrium; muscle of thigh; muscle layer of sigmoid colon / Top expressed in: decidua; subiculum; Region I of hippocampus proper; prefrontal cortex; temporal lobe; hippocampus proper; amygdala; primary motor cortex; dentate gyrus of hippocampal formation granule cell; piriform cortex; More reference expression data
BioGPS	More reference expression data
Gene ontology
Molecular function	transferase activity; acetylglucosaminyltransferase activity; manganese ion binding; glycosyltransferase activity; metal ion binding; catalytic activity; UDP-xylosyltransferase activity; glucuronosyltransferase activity; xylosyltransferase activity; protein binding
Cellular component	integral component of membrane; integral component of Golgi membrane; Golgi apparatus; membrane; Golgi membrane; intracellular membrane-bounded organelle
Biological process	glycosphingolipid biosynthetic process; glycoprotein biosynthetic process; protein glycosylation; metabolism; N-acetylglucosamine metabolic process; protein O-linked glycosylation; protein O-linked mannosylation; skeletal muscle tissue regeneration; muscle cell cellular homeostasis; skeletal muscle organ development
Sources:Amigo / QuickGO
Orthologs
Databases	NCBI: entry; OMA: entry
Species	Human	Mouse
Entrez	9215	16795
Ensembl	ENSG00000133424	ENSMUSG00000004383
UniProt	O95461	Q9Z1M7
RefSeq (mRNA)	NM_004737; NM_133642; NM_001362949; NM_001362951; NM_001362953	NM_010687; NM_001317391
RefSeq (protein)	NP_004728; NP_598397; NP_001349878; NP_001349880; NP_001349882 NP_001365553; NP_001365554; NP_001365555; NP_001365556; NP_001365557; NP_001365558; NP_001365559; NP_001365560	NP_001304320; NP_034817
Location (UCSC)	Chr 22: 33.16 – 33.92 Mb	Chr 8: 73.54 – 74.08 Mb
PubMed search
- Wikidata
View/Edit Human	View/Edit Mouse

Xylosyl- and glucuronyltransferase LARGE1 is an enzyme that in humans is encoded by the gene LARGE1 (formerly LARGE). In 2024, a deep mutational scanning was conducted, which generated functional scores for all possible single nucleotide variants of the human LARGE1 coding sequence.

== Function ==
This gene, which is one of the largest in the human genome, encodes a member of the N-acetylglucosaminyltransferase gene family. The exact function of LARGE, a golgi protein, remains uncertain. It encodes a glycosyltransferase which participates in glycosylation of alpha-dystroglycan, and may carry out the synthesis of glycoprotein and glycosphingolipid sugar chains. It may also be involved in the addition of a repeated disaccharide unit. Mutations in this gene cause MDC1D, a novel form of congenital muscular dystrophy with severe mental retardation and abnormal glycosylation of alpha-dystroglycan. Alternative splicing of this gene results in two transcript variants that encode the same protein.

LARGE may also play a role in tumor-specific genomic rearrangements. Mutations in this gene may be involved in the development and progression of meningioma through modification of ganglioside composition and other glycosylated molecules in tumor cells.

== See also ==
- LARGE2
