= Muscle–eye–brain disease =

- Other names: Muscular dystrophy-dystroglycanopathy congenital with brain and eye anomalies A3
- Muscle–eye–brain disease has an autosomal recessive inheritance.
- Specialty: Neurology
- Usual onset: Birth or infancy

Muscle–eye–brain (MEB) disease, also known as muscular dystrophy-dystroglycanopathy congenital with brain and eye anomalies A3 (MDDGA3), is a kind of rare congenital muscular dystrophy (CMD), largely characterized by hypotonia at birth. Patients have muscular dystrophy, central nervous system abnormalities and ocular abnormalities. The condition is degenerative.

MEB is caused by mutations in the POMGnT1 gene, it is congenital and inherited as an autosomal recessive disorder. There is no cure for MEB. Supportive care mainly focuses on symptoms alleviation which varies in different clinical settings. Symptomatic treatment may include physiological therapies, occupational therapies, medications, and surgeries. The life expectancy of patients with MEB is 10-30 years old, although there have been cases with longer lifespans.

== Signs and symptoms ==
The main signs and symptoms of MEB includes:

- Muscle dystrophies: muscle weakness, hypotonia, muscle atrophy
- Ocular abnormalities: lack of visual response, severe myopia, glaucoma
- Central nervous system abnormalities: intellectual disability, cortical malformation

=== Muscle dystrophies ===
The most prevalent signs of MEB is infants being born floppy. It refers to the condition of hypotonia. The types of hypotonia found on patients include generalized hypotonia, diffuse hypotonia, congenital hypotonia and the other subtypes. Its cause behind is mainly the severe muscular dystrophy and partly brain abnormalities.

80% - 99% individuals display various myopathy. In general, they manifest severe muscle weakness and retarded motor development. Hence, gait disturbance (abnormal walking) is found in 80% - 99% of the diseased individuals. A significant portion of them have limited mobility that fail to walk or even rotate the head. The muscle weakness affects facial muscles apart from skeletal muscles. It gives rise to speech impairment in most of the cases.

The other signs include joint and/or spinal rigidity, reduced muscle mass, hyporeflexia, muscular contracture, spasticity, muscle atrophy and spinal deformities.

=== Ocular abnormalities ===
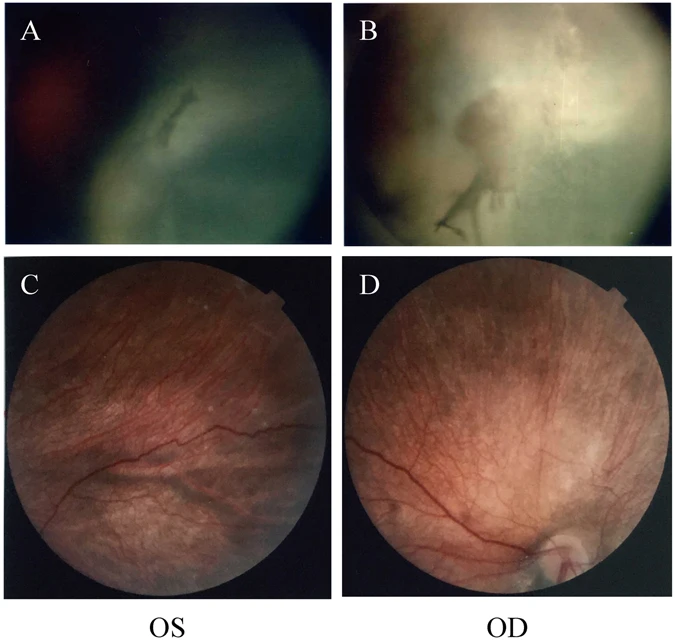
Fundoscopy of the patients with muscle-eye-brain disease. In Fig.A, there is a cataract and in Fig.B optic nerve atrophy, and left retinal dysplasia can be seen. in Fig.C and Fig.D retinal and choroidal pigment epithelium atrophy and optic nerve atrophy can be seen.

Visual problems are often found in people with MEB. Patients have low visual acuity and fail to fixate to the visual stimuli. Depends on the severity, some display no visual response, some can response to light and some to object.

More than 80% of the patients reported visual impairment. Common problems include glaucoma, myopia, strabismus ("crossed-eye") and optic atrophy which all occurs in 80-99%. Optic atrophy contains poor pigmentation of ocular fundi, thin blood vessels of retina, small optic discs and scleral border and optic coloboma (degeneration of the inferior optic nerve). Cataract affects 30% - 79% of individuals. Buphthalmos (enlargement of the eyeball), megalocornea (enlargement of cornea) and nystagmus (uncontrollable eyeball movement) are present in some rare case.

Although ocular abnormalities account for the poor vision to a large extent, some of the visual problems is associated with the brain abnormalities.

=== Central nervous system abnormalities ===
MEB impairs the cognition gravely. This is reflected by the abnormal EEG and EMG reading in 80% - 99% individuals. At the same frequency, hydrocephalus present in many cases. The severe form of it is associated with the compression of other nerves and results in more complications.

Clinical features include severe intellectually disability in all aspects. Most individuals have intellectual disabilities of a range of severity. Progressive deterioration in behavioral development has been recorded. Epilepsy and seizures are found in 30% - 79% of the affected individuals.

Manifestations in structural malformation are common as well. Hypoplasia of mesencephalon, pons, cerebellum and medulla are often. Aplasia may occur on top of hypoplasia. Flattened brainstem, ventriculomegaly, pachygyria, Type II lissencephaly have been reported. At the rate between 5% and 29% holoprosencephaly and meningocele occurs in patients too.

=== Physical appearances ===
Distinctive facial features for MEB found are high prominent forehead, bulging eye and narrow temporal regions.

== Causes ==
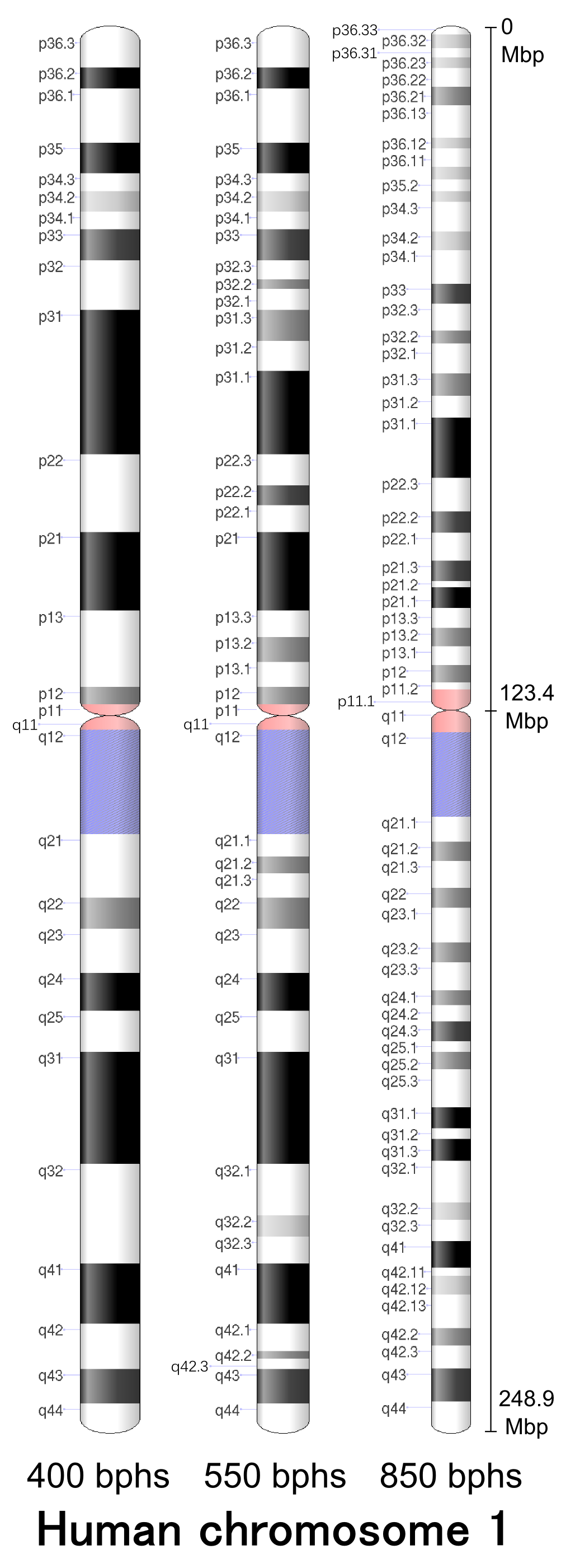
Cytogenetic location of the POMGnT 1 gene is 1p34.1.

MEB is caused by mutations of the protein O-linked mannose β1,2-N-acetylglucosaminyltransferase 1 (POMGnT1) gene. Pathogenic variants mutate the gene and lead to dysfunction of the POMGnT1 enzyme. Currently, there are 14 clinically identified mutations, the locations are dispersed and scattered throughout the POMGnT1 gene. Different mutations were observed in MEB patients from different countries, namely Finland, Sweden, Norway, Estonia, USA, Israel, Spain and Italy. From 14 non-Finnish patients, 9 different types of mutation were identified.

The location of the mutation is slightly correlated with the severity of the symptoms in terms of brain structural abnormalities. Mutations close to the 5′ terminus of the POMGnT1 coding region lead to relatively more severe phenotype such as hydrocephalus. Mutations that occurred close to the 3′ terminus shows weaker symptoms.

MEB is an autosomal recessive disease inherited from parents. Patients with MEB have two copies of a pathogenic variant in their gene. There will be a risk of having a child with MEB given that both parents are carriers of a pathogenic variant in their gene. The affected child inherits a mutated copy of the gene from each carrier parent. The chance of inheritance is 1 in 4 when both parents carry the pathogenic variant.

== Pathophysiology ==
The pathogenesis of MEB is related to an abnormal level of α‐dystroglycan glycosylation. Genetic mutations of the POMGnT1 gene reduced the O-mannosyl glycosylation of α-dystroglycan. The POMGnT1 gene encodes the enzyme POMGnT1, a type II transmembrane protein residing in the Golgi Apparatus. The role of the enzyme POMGnT1 is to catalyse glycosylation specific for alpha-linked terminal mannose, the process where N-acetylglucosamine is added to O-linked mannose of α-dystroglycan. In humans, O-mannosylation is a rare type of glycosylation, occurring in skeletal muscle, brain and nerve glycoproteins. O-mannosylation is used to increase the stability of the interaction between the extracellular basement membrane and α-dystroglycan. Without stabilization, the glycoprotein cannot anchor to the cell, leading to congenital muscular dystrophy (CMD), characterised by severe brain malformations.

== Diagnosis ==
Medical diagnosis for the MEB usually involves the study of family history, measurement of serum CPK level, molecular testing, muscle biopsy and imaging study.

=== Physical examination ===
People with MEB have distinctive facial dysmorphisms. Rounded forehead, thin and drooping lip, micrognathia, midface retrusion, short nasal bridge are the possible indicative evidence for diagnosis. Assessment of motor and mental development, visual ability also provide clues.

=== Genetic test ===
Genetic test can analyze the genome of infants for confirmation of the specific genetic mutation. Mutation in the POMGNT1 is the determinant in the diagnosis of MEB. Several mutations like [c.1539+1G→A], [c.879+5G→T] are the prevalent nucleotide change found in affected people. The commonly used practices collect fetal DNA by chronic villus sampling, followed by linkage analysis and direct sequencing to conclude the POMGNT1 gene sequence.

The genome determination helps to distinguish other congenital muscular dystrophies before and after birth. However, only some laboratories provide prenatal genetic test to screen for MEB.

=== Medical imaging ===
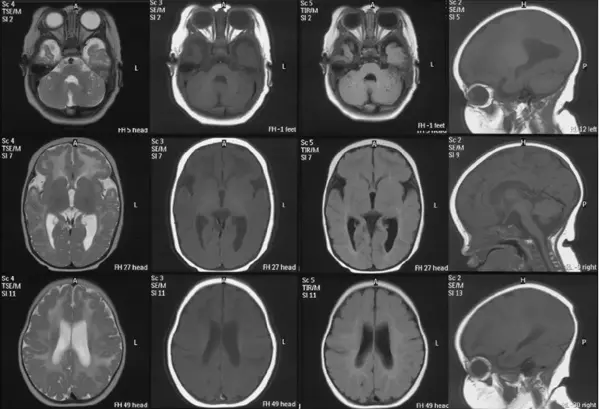
Brain MRI of the patients with muscle-eye-brain disease. MRI shows frontal lobe micropolygyria, abnormal white-matter signals in the bilateral frontal region, dysplasia of the brainstem and cerebellum, and cerebellar cysts with abnormal white matter signals.

MEB can be diagnosed with medical imaging by the shared patterns of brain structural abnormalities. Common practice includes magnetic resonance imaging (MRI) and computerized tomography (CT). They can show the enlargement of ventricle, absence or degeneration of septum pellucidum, pachygyric symptoms, abnormalities in corpus collosum, lissencephaly. Fetal MRI and ultrasound are used as a prenatal diagnostic tool if needed to screen for the disease. Observation like general structural malformation in the third trimester suggests congenital muscular dystrophy. Further diagnostic test is required to make confirmation.

Clinically, MRI is preferred over CT scan for its ability to reveal the neuron migration more precisely. The result obtained from CT scan is limited to the size of ventricles and location of white matter whereas only MRI can provide information on cortical problems.

=== Muscle biopsy ===
Muscle biopsy is a means to investigate the muscle tissue. Morphology of muscle cells and other chemical parameters can be used to diagnoses muscle–eye–brian disease.

==== Histological analysis ====
Direct examination of muscular tissues can proof muscle dystrophy, which can support the potential diagnosis of MEB. Patients are found to have myofibrils round in shape and in markedly various diameters, later nuclei, regenerating fibers and angulated fibers as a result from atrophy.

==== Enzymatic assay ====
The mutation of MEB involves the malfunction of O-mannosyl ß-1,2-N-acetylgucosaminyltransfersase 1. By measuring the enzymatic activity of this protein, the presence of MEB can be affirmed. Fibroblast and lymphoblasts are chosen to be the assayed participants.

==== Immunochemistry ====
Western-blot (immunoblot) can be used to detect the O-mannosyl ß-1,2-N-acetylgucosaminyltransfersase 1 for diagnosis. It helps to evaluate the glycosylation state of the protein which it supposed to do.

=== Difficulties ===
As a subtype of muscular dystrophy-dystroglycanopathy, MEB is often confused with other sub-type including Walker–Warburg syndrome and Fukuyama congenital muscular dystrophy. All these 3 diseases share similar clinical presentation and are classified as the Type A(severe). Overlapped findings contain clinical presentation and immunochemistry result. The diagnosis has to make distinction among them. The decisive evidences for MEB are:

	MEB	WWS	FCMD
Epidemiology	Finland	Worldwide	Japan
Characteristic result of physical examination
Ocular abnormalities	Progressive myopia with retinal degeneration	Severe malformations	Simple myopia and cataract without structural change
Common contractures location	Elbow and knee	Elbow	Elbow, knee, ankle and hip
Characteristic result of genetic test
Major defected gene contributor	POMGNT1	POMT1, POMT2	FKTN
Minor defected gene contributor	FKRP, FKTN	FKRP, FCMD, LARGE, ISPD	--
Characteristic result of MRI
Cerebral cortex	Diffused dysplasia	Diffused cobblestone lissencephaly	Frontal polymicrogyria
White matter	Uneven T1 and T2 prolongation	No myelin in cerebrum or cerebellum	Delayed cerebral myelination
Others
Serum creatine kinase level	Normal to elevated	Elevated to high level	Elevated

MEB: muscle–eye–brain disease

WWS: Walker–Warburg syndrome

FCMD: Fukuyama congenital muscular dystrophy

== Management ==
There is no current curative treatment for any form of muscle dystrophies and only symptomatic care is available for the patients.

The corresponding supportive care to symptoms is:

Symptom	Corresponding support treatment
Contractures	Physiological therapy and tendon-release surgery if needed
Scoliosis	Bracing, splinting and corrective surgery such as spinal fixation
Muscle weakness	Leg braces, wheelchair, occupation therapy
Respiratory problem	Regular monitoring by spirometry, noninvasive nighttime ventilation, tracheostomy, assisted coughing techniques
Learning disabilities	Specialized education programs
Seizures	Anti-seizures medication
Vision problems	Wear special eyeglasses
Nutritional care	Nasogastric tubes for short-term usage, gastrostomy for chronic need

== Prognosis ==
MEB has a wide range in severity. Most children with MEB has a life expectancy of 10-30 years. But in some patients with milder type of congenital muscle dystrophies, might have a survival up to more than 70 years being possible. The severity of MEB determines its prognosis. Though the prognosis is associated with the progression of symptoms, supportive care enhances the quality of life and also the life expectancy.

== Epidemiology ==
The majority of MEB occurrence is reported in the Finnish population. It is estimated to affect 1 in 50,000 newborns in Finland. MEB is also identified outside of Finland, there were cases of suspected MEB in Japan and Korea. However, worldwide distribution is unclear. According to the European Union, the estimated prevalence of MEB in Europe is 0.12 per 100000.^{[41]}

Carrier rates
Ethnicity	Detection Rate	Carrier Frequency
Finnish	>99%	1 in 50
General Population	88%	1 in 500

The frequency of being a carrier of MEB is 1 in 50 in Finland, carriers for MEB commonly shows no signs or symptoms. However, their offsprings will have a higher chance to be affected by MEB.

== History ==
MEB was first discovered in Finland. In 1978, a patient from Finland showed symptoms including congenital muscular weakness, severe myopia, glaucoma, optical malformation, intellectual disability, retinal hypoplasia, etc. In 1980, 14 more people with similar symptoms were identified in Finland. Similar cases were also published in 1989. The disease was found in Dutch in 1992, 6 people were affected coming from 4 families. After that, more cases were reported outside the Finnish population.

MEB is phenotypically similar to the Walker–Warburg syndrome (WWS), both disorders are congenital muscular dystrophy. In 1990, Santavuori argued to distinct MEB from WWS, since MEB is specifically involving muscle weakness and there is a relatively long survival for MEB patients. In the same year, Dobyns further examined the relation of WWS and MEB.

In 2001, the cause of MEB was first demonstrated as the mutations in the POMGNT1 gene, causing loss of its function.
