= POMGNT1 =

Human gene

Identifiers
- Aliases: POMGNT1, GNTI.2, GnT I.2, LGMD2O, MEB, MGAT1.2, gnT-I.2, protein O-linked mannose N-acetylglucosaminyltransferase 1 (beta 1,2-), RP76, LGMDR15
- External IDs: OMIM: 606822; MGI: 1915523; GeneCards: POMGNT1

Gene location (Human)
Chr.	Chromosome 1 (human)
Band	1p34.1	Start	46,188,683 bp
Band	1p34.1	End	46,220,305 bp

Gene location (Mouse)
Chr.	Chromosome 4 (mouse)
Band	4|4 D1	Start	115,981,037 bp
Band	4|4 D1	End	116,017,046 bp
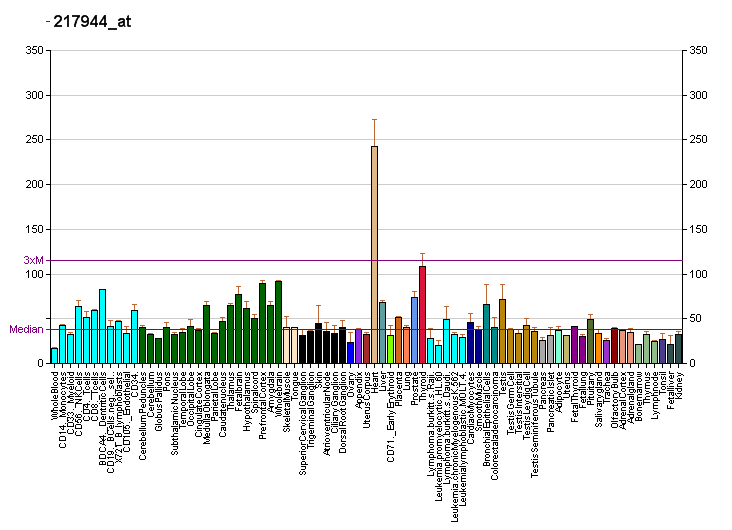
RNA expression pattern
Bgee	Human / Mouse (ortholog); Top expressed in: apex of heart; C1 segment; anterior pituitary; left ventricle; right lobe of thyroid gland; left lobe of thyroid gland; right frontal lobe; gastrocnemius muscle; right auricle of heart; nucleus accumbens / Top expressed in: lacrimal gland; spermatid; spermatocyte; choroid plexus of fourth ventricle; salivary gland; Epithelium of choroid plexus; submandibular gland; parotid gland; seminal vesicula; muscle of thigh; More reference expression data
BioGPS	More reference expression data
Gene ontology
Molecular function	transferase activity; protein binding; glycosyltransferase activity; beta-1,3-galactosyl-O-glycosyl-glycoprotein beta-1,3-N-acetylglucosaminyltransferase activity; acetylglucosaminyltransferase activity; manganese ion binding; metal ion binding
Cellular component	Golgi apparatus; membrane; Golgi membrane; integral component of membrane; integral component of Golgi membrane
Biological process	protein glycosylation; protein O-linked glycosylation; O-glycan processing
Sources:Amigo / QuickGO
Orthologs
Databases	NCBI: entry; OMA: entry
Species	Human	Mouse
Entrez	55624	68273
Ensembl	ENSG00000085998	ENSMUSG00000028700
UniProt	Q8WZA1	Q91X88
RefSeq (mRNA)	NM_001243766; NM_001290129; NM_001290130; NM_017739	NM_001290658; NM_026651; NM_029786
RefSeq (protein)	NP_001230695; NP_001277058; NP_001277059; NP_060209	NP_001277587; NP_080927; NP_084062
Location (UCSC)	Chr 1: 46.19 – 46.22 Mb	Chr 4: 115.98 – 116.02 Mb
PubMed search
- Wikidata
View/Edit Human	View/Edit Mouse

Protein O-linked-mannose beta-1,2-N-acetylglucosaminyltransferase 1 is an enzyme that in humans is encoded by the POMGNT1 gene.

== Function and expression ==
The product of the POMGNT1 gene, protein O-mannose beta-1,2-N-acetylglucosaminyltransferase (POMGnT1), participates in O-mannosyl glycan synthesis. A mutation in this gene is the cause of muscle-eye-brain disease (MIM 253280).

Transcription of the POMGNT1 gene gives rise to a 2.7 kb mRNA in different tissues, with higher expression levels in the skeletal muscle, heart, and kidney and lower levels in the brain. POMGnT1 (EC 2.4.1.101) is a protein belonging to the GT13 family of glycosyltransferases according to the Carbohydrate-Active enZYmes (CAZy) database. In humans, the main isoform of POMGnT1 contains 660 amino acids whose sequence yields a calculated molecular mass of 75,252 Da (UniProtKB Q8WZA1).

The POMGNT1 mRNA and its encoded protein is expressed in the neural retina of all mammals studied. POMGnT1 locates in the cytoplasmic fraction in the mouse retina, where it concentrates in the Golgi complex within the myoid of photoreceptor inner segments.
