= Dystroglycan =

Protein

DAG1
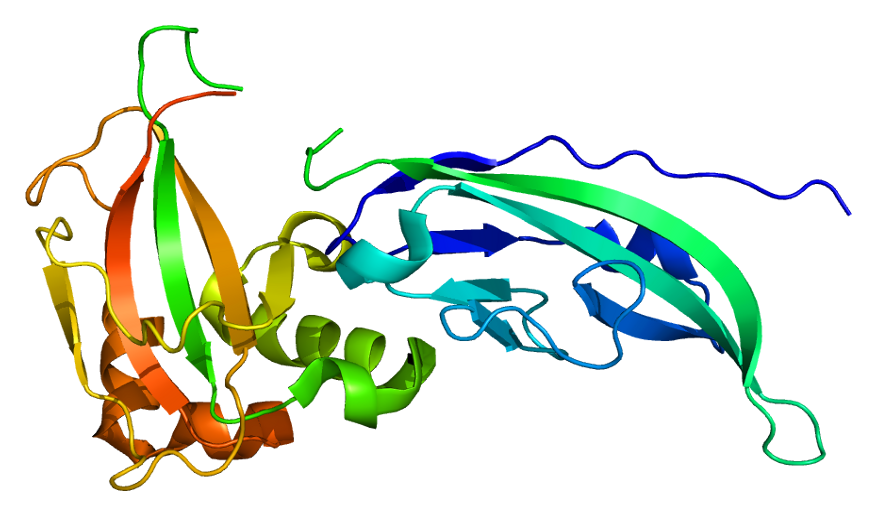

Identifiers
- Aliases: DAG1, 156DAG, A3a, AGRNR, DAG, MDDGC7, MDDGC9, MDDGA9, dystroglycan 1, LGMDR16
- External IDs: OMIM: 128239; MGI: 101864; GeneCards: DAG1
Available structures
PDB	Ortholog search: PDBe RCSB
PDB	List of PDB id codes 1EG4, 2MK7

Gene location (Human)
Chr.	Chromosome 3 (human)
Band	3p21.31	Start	49,468,703 bp
Band	3p21.31	End	49,535,618 bp

Gene location (Mouse)
Chr.	Chromosome 9 (mouse)
Band	9 F1- F2|9 59.08 cM	Start	108,081,833 bp
Band	9 F1- F2|9 59.08 cM	End	108,141,157 bp
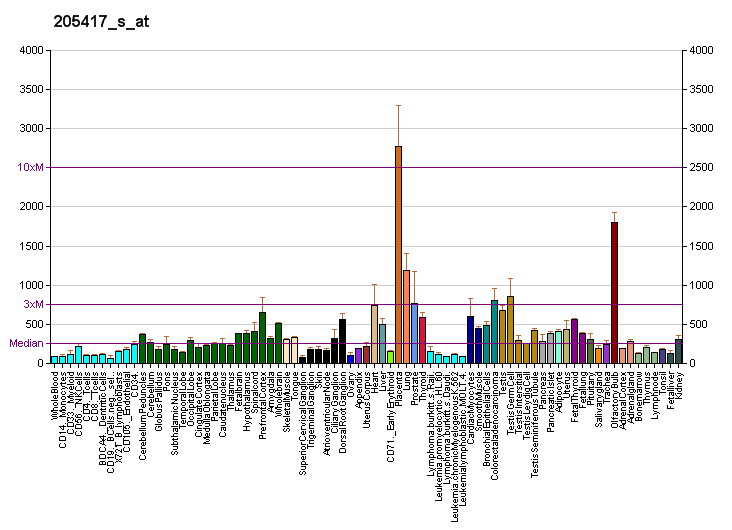

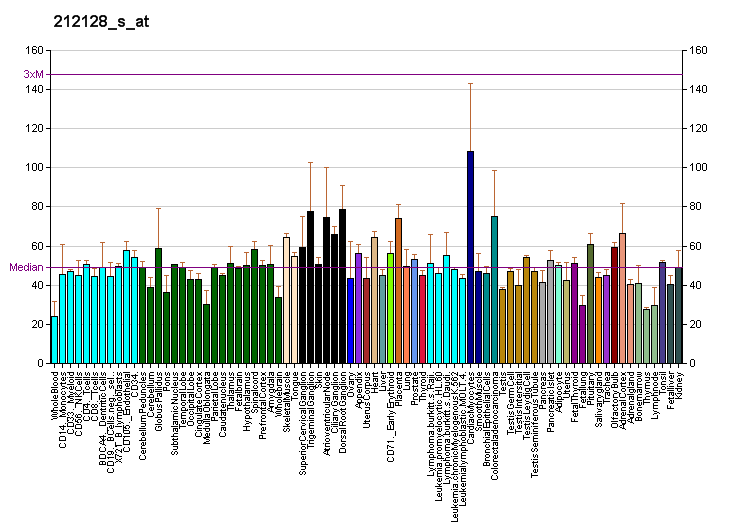
RNA expression pattern
Bgee	Human / Mouse (ortholog); Top expressed in: olfactory bulb; trigeminal ganglion; spinal ganglia; glomerulus; metanephric glomerulus; pancreatic ductal cell; placenta; parotid gland; nipple; saphenous vein / Top expressed in: sciatic nerve; renal corpuscle; gastrula; left lung; left lung lobe; decidua; myocardium of ventricle; right ventricle; right lung; Gonadal ridge; More reference expression data
BioGPS	More reference expression data
Gene ontology
Molecular function	calcium ion binding; protein binding; virus receptor activity; alpha-actinin binding; vinculin binding; actin binding; tubulin binding; structural constituent of muscle; SH2 domain binding; laminin binding; laminin-1 binding; dystroglycan binding
Cellular component	cell-cell junction; nucleus; synapse; contractile ring; filopodium; node of Ranvier; costamere; lamellipodium; dystroglycan complex; membrane raft; cell junction; cytoskeleton; membrane; extracellular exosome; basolateral plasma membrane; postsynaptic membrane; sarcolemma; cytoplasm; integral component of membrane; focal adhesion; plasma membrane; dystrophin-associated glycoprotein complex; nucleoplasm; basement membrane; cytosol; extracellular space; endoplasmic reticulum lumen; Golgi lumen; plasma membrane raft; external side of plasma membrane; nuclear periphery; extracellular matrix; extracellular region; collagen-containing extracellular matrix; glutamatergic synapse; GABA-ergic synapse; postsynaptic cytosol
Biological process	NLS-bearing protein import into nucleus; extracellular matrix organization; viral process; regulation of embryonic cell shape; response to peptide hormone; regulation of epithelial to mesenchymal transition; positive regulation of basement membrane assembly involved in embryonic body morphogenesis; viral entry into host cell; regulation of gastrulation; negative regulation of cell migration; Schwann cell development; membrane protein ectodomain proteolysis; calcium-dependent cell-matrix adhesion; negative regulation of MAPK cascade; nerve maturation; microtubule anchoring; commissural neuron axon guidance; branching involved in salivary gland morphogenesis; negative regulation of protein kinase B signaling; morphogenesis of an epithelial sheet; myelination in peripheral nervous system; basement membrane organization; epithelial tube branching involved in lung morphogenesis; modulation by virus of host process; protein O-linked glycosylation; positive regulation of cell-matrix adhesion; ageing; Schwann cell differentiation; response to denervation involved in regulation of muscle adaptation; nerve development; axon regeneration; positive regulation of myelination; skeletal muscle tissue regeneration; positive regulation of protein kinase activity; positive regulation of oligodendrocyte differentiation; cellular response to mechanical stimulus; cellular response to cholesterol; angiogenesis involved in wound healing; regulation of synapse organization; regulation of neurotransmitter receptor localization to postsynaptic specialization membrane; retrograde trans-synaptic signaling by trans-synaptic protein complex
Sources:Amigo / QuickGO
Orthologs
Databases	NCBI: entry; OMA: entry
Species	Human	Mouse
Entrez	1605	13138
Ensembl	ENSG00000173402	ENSMUSG00000039952
UniProt	Q14118	Q62165
RefSeq (mRNA)	NM_004393; NM_001165928; NM_001177634; NM_001177635; NM_001177636 NM_001177637; NM_001177638; NM_001177639; NM_001177640; NM_001177641; NM_001177642; NM_001177643; NM_001177644	NM_001276481; NM_001276482; NM_001276485; NM_001276486; NM_001276492 NM_001276493; NM_001276494; NM_010017
RefSeq (protein)	NP_001159400; NP_001171105; NP_001171106; NP_001171107; NP_001171108 NP_001171109; NP_001171110; NP_001171111; NP_001171112; NP_001171113; NP_001171114; NP_001171115; NP_004384	NP_001263410; NP_001263411; NP_001263414; NP_001263415; NP_001263421 NP_001263422; NP_034147
Location (UCSC)	Chr 3: 49.47 – 49.54 Mb	Chr 9: 108.08 – 108.14 Mb
PubMed search
- Wikidata
View/Edit Human	View/Edit Mouse

Dystroglycan is a protein that in humans is encoded by the DAG1 gene.

Dystroglycan is one of the dystrophin-associated glycoproteins, which is encoded by a 5.5 kb transcript in Homo sapiens on chromosome 3. There are two exons that are separated by a large intron. The spliced exons code for a protein product that is finally cleaved into two non-covalently associated subunits, [alpha] (N-terminal) and [beta] (C-terminal).

== Function ==
In skeletal muscle the dystroglycan complex works as a transmembrane linkage between the extracellular matrix and the cytoskeleton. [alpha]-dystroglycan is extracellular and binds to merosin [alpha]-2 laminin in the basement membrane, while [beta]-dystroglycan is a transmembrane protein and binds to dystrophin, which is a large rod-like cytoskeletal protein, absent in Duchenne muscular dystrophy patients. Dystrophin binds to intracellular actin cables. In this way, the dystroglycan complex, which links the extracellular matrix to the intracellular actin cables, is thought to provide structural integrity in muscle tissues. The dystroglycan complex is also known to serve as an agrin receptor in muscle, where it may regulate agrin-induced acetylcholine receptor clustering at the neuromuscular junction. There is also evidence which suggests the function of dystroglycan as a part of the signal transduction pathway because it is shown that Grb2, a mediator of the Ras-related signal pathway, can interact with the cytoplasmic domain of dystroglycan.

Proper glycosylation of alpha-dystroglycan is essential for its function. In 2024, a high-throughput functional assay was developed to measure glycosylation levels and assess the functional impact of variants in the enzymes responsible for this process.

== Expression ==
Dystroglycan is widely distributed in non-muscle tissues as well as in muscle tissues. During epithelial morphogenesis of the kidney, the dystroglycan complex is shown to act as a receptor for the basement membrane. Dystroglycan expression in Mus musculus brain and neural retina has also been reported. However, the physiological role of dystroglycan in non-muscle tissues remains unclear.

In December 2022, a review of the implications of abnormal dystroglycan expression and/or O-mannosylation on the pathogenesis of cancer was published.

== Interactions ==
Dystroglycan has been shown to interact with FYN, C-src tyrosine kinase, Src, NCK1, Grb2, Caveolin 3 and SHC1.

== See also ==
- Actin-binding protein
- Agrin
- Dystrophin-associated protein complex
- Vitiligo
