= Limb–girdle muscular dystrophy =

Muscular degenerative disorder primarily of the hip and shoulders

- Other names: Erb's muscular dystrophy
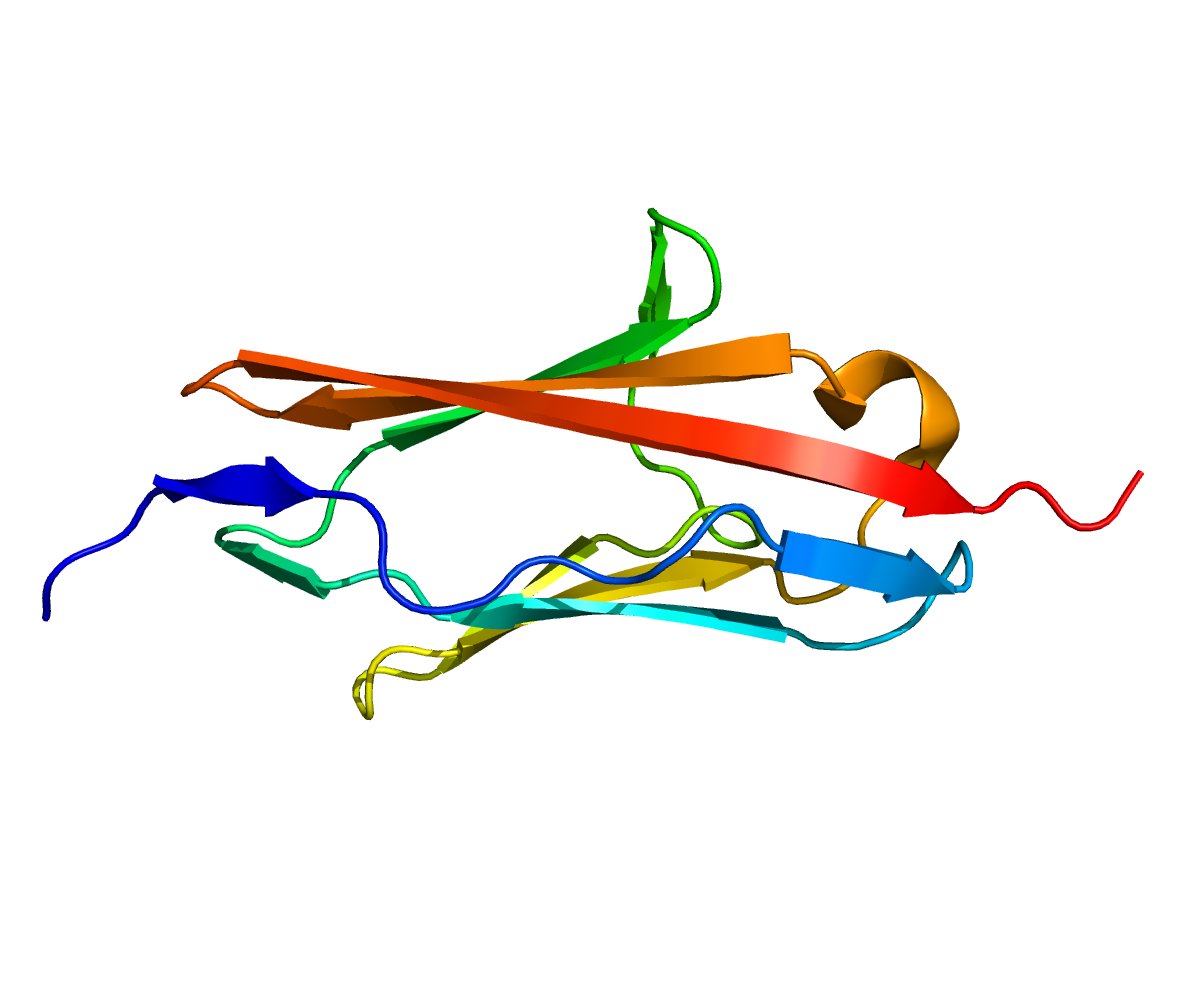
- Protein MYOT (also known as TTID one of the many genes whose mutations are responsible for this condition)
- Specialty: Neurology, neuromuscular medicine
- Symptoms: Pelvic muscle weakness
- Duration: Lifelong
- Types: 32 types
- Causes: Genetic mutations
- Diagnostic method: Genetic testing, and possibly muscle biopsy
- Differential diagnosis: Muscular dystrophies: Duchenne, Becker, facioscapulohumeral, Emery-Dreifuss; Pompe disease; congenital myasthenic syndrome; motor neuropathy
- Treatment: Occupational therapy, speech therapy, and physical therapy
- Frequency: 2.27–10 per 100,000

Limb–girdle muscular dystrophy (LGMD) is a genetically heterogeneous group of rare muscular dystrophies that share a set of clinical characteristics. It is characterised by progressive muscle wasting which affects predominantly hip and shoulder muscles. LGMD is an inheritable condition, which may be passed on to offspring via autosomal dominant or autosomal recessive patterns of inheritance. It currently has no known cure or treatment.

LGMD may be triggered or worsened in genetically susceptible individuals by statins, because of their effects on HMG-CoA reductase.

== Signs and symptoms ==
By definition, all limb-girdle muscular dystrophies (LGMD) cause progressive proximal weakness, meaning weakness of the muscles on or close to the torso that worsens over time. Explicitly, LGMD preferentially affects muscles of the hip girdle, thigh, shoulder girdle, and/or upper arm. The muscle weakness is generally symmetric. Usually, the hip girdle is the first area to exhibit weakness, manifesting as difficulty walking, going up and/or downstairs, rising from a chair, bending at the waist, or squatting. Because of these difficulties, falling can occur frequently. Weakness of the shoulder girdle can make lifting objects, or even elevating the arms, difficult or impossible. The rate of progression varies between patients. Eventually, the ability to run and walk can deteriorate. The disease commonly leads to dependence on a wheelchair within years of symptom onset, although some patients maintain mobility. Eventually the disease can affect other muscles such as the ones located in the face.

By definition, LGMDs primarily affect skeletal muscles, although cardiac muscle can be affected to a lesser degree in select subtypes, which can cause palpitations.There can be significant variability in disease features and severity between LGMD subtypes, and even within any given LGMD subtype. Additional possible presentations include:

PVC (a type of palpitation) recording
An audio clip recording of a PVC symptom, made with a cardiac event monitor

- Pseudoathletic appearance (muscle hypertrophy and/or pseudohypertrophy)
- Respiratory muscle problems
- Low back discomfort
- Distal muscle problems
- Secondary muscular mitochondrial impairment

== Genetics ==
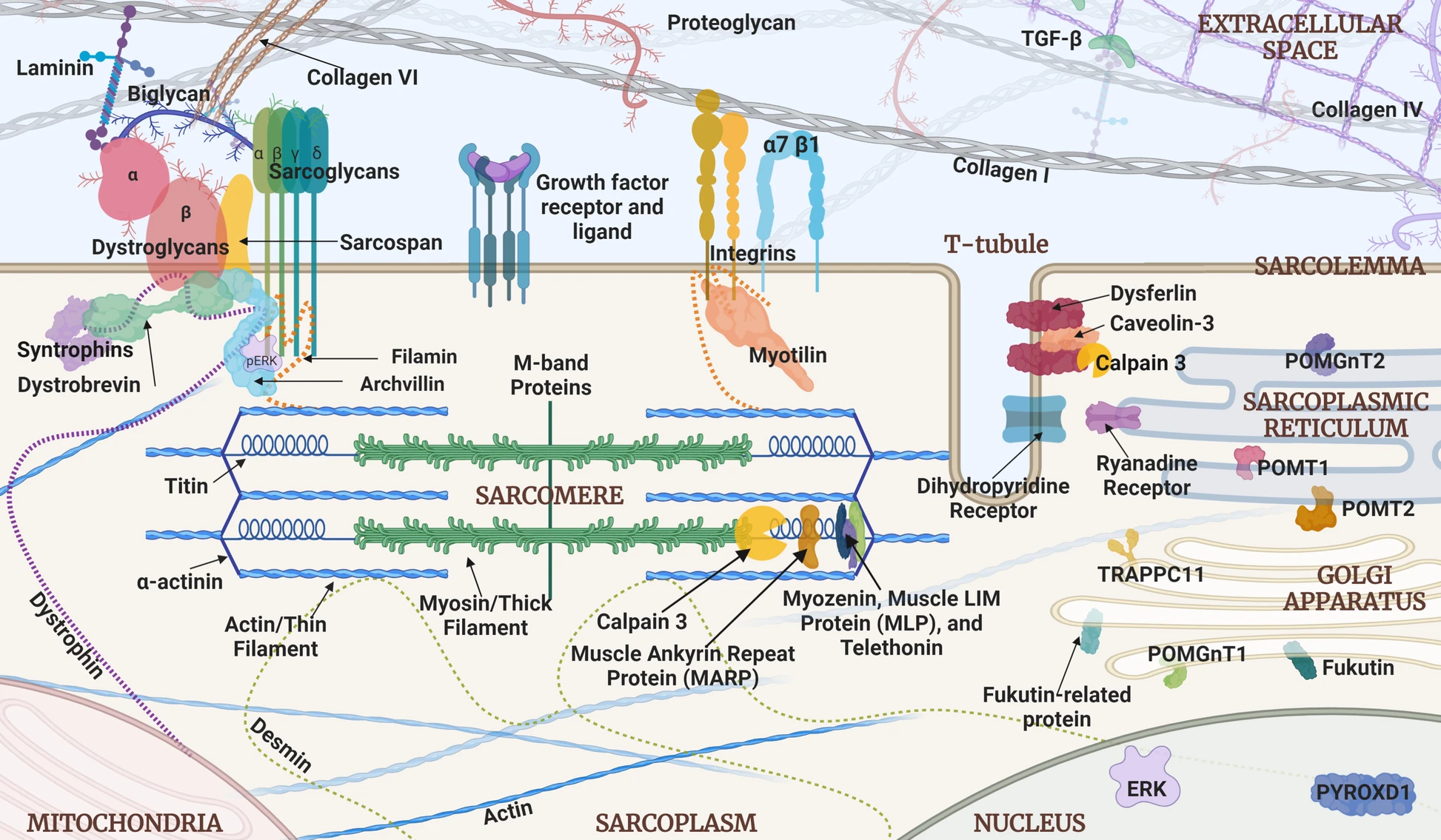
The various molecules involved in muscle function and implicated in LGMD

LGMD is a genetic and heritable disorder, due to one of many genetic mutations of proteins involved in muscle function. All currently identified LGMDs have an inheritance pattern that is dominant or recessive, although the definition of LGMD allows for diseases with more complicated inheritance patterns to be classified as LGMD. Pathogenic mutations are mostly in coding regions, but non-coding causative variants were also reported.

In Euroasia, Calpain-3 (CAPN3) mutations are the most common cause of LGMD. However, in northern Europe, mutations in Fukutin-related protein (FKRP) are also very common. HMG CoA Reductase homozygous mutation leads to a form of LGMD that may respond to treatment with the downstream metabolite mevalonolactone in the cholesterol synthesis pathway.

== Diagnosis ==
Limb-girdle muscular dystrophy can be diagnosed via muscle biopsy, which will show the presence of muscular dystrophy, and genetic testing is used to determine which type of muscular dystrophy a patient has. Immunohistochemical dystrophin tests can indicate a decrease in dystrophin detected in sarcoglycanopathies. In terms of sarcoglycan deficiency, there can be variance (if α-sarcoglycan and γ-sarcoglycan are not present then there's a mutation in LGMD2D).The 2014 Evidence-based guideline summary: Diagnosis and treatment of limb-girdle and distal dystrophies indicates that individuals suspected of having the inherited disorder should have genetic testing. Other tests/analysis are:

- High CK levels (10–150 times normal)
- MRI can indicate different types of LGMD.
- EMG can confirm the myopathic characteristic of the disease.
- Electrocardiography (cardiac arrhythmias in LGMD1B can occur)

=== Types ===
The "LGMD D" family is autosomal dominant, and the "LGMD R" family is autosomal recessive. Limb-girdle muscular dystrophy is explained in terms of the gene, locus, OMIM, and type as follows:

LGMD subtypes
Name	Inheritance	Old Name	OMIM	Gene	Gene also implicated in:	Notes
LGMD D1 DNAJB6-related	Autosomal dominant	LGMD1D & LGMD1E	603511	DNAJB6		
LGMD D2 TNP03-related	Autosomal dominant	LGMD1F	608423	TNPO3		
LGMD D3 HNRNPDL-related	Autosomal dominant	LGMD1G	609115	HNRPDL		
LGMD D4 calpain3-related	Autosomal dominant	LGMD1I	618129	CAPN3	LGMD R1	Also referred to as "autosomal dominant calpainopathy."
LGMD D5 collagen 6-related	Autosomal dominant	Bethlem myopathy 1	158810	COL6A1, COL6A2, COL6A3	Bethlem myopathy 1 (recessive), LGMD R22; Ullrich congenital muscular dystrophy 1	
?	Autosomal dominant	Bethlem myopathy 2	616471	COL12A1	Ullrich congenital muscular dystrophy 2	Formerly referred to as "Ehlers–Danlos syndrome, myopathic type"
LGMD R1 calpain3-related	Autosomal recessive	LGMD2A	253600	CAPN3	LGMD D4	Also referred to as "autosomal recessive calpainopathy."
LGMD R2 dysferlin-related	Autosomal recessive	LGMD2B	253601	DYSF	Miyoshi myopathy type 1 (MMD1 - 254130).	A dysferlinopathy
LGMD R3 α-sarcoglycan-related	Autosomal recessive	LGMD2D	608099	SGCA		sarcoglycanopathies
LGMD R4 β -sarcoglycan-related	Autosomal recessive	LGMD2E	604286	SGCB		sarcoglycanopathies
LGMD R5 γ -sarcoglycan-related	Autosomal recessive	LGMD2C	253700	SGCG		sarcoglycanopathies
LGMD R6 δ-sarcoglycan-related	Autosomal recessive	LGMD2F	601287	SGCD		sarcoglycanopathies
LGMD R7 telethonin-related	Autosomal recessive	LGMD2G	601954	TCAP		
LGMD R8 TRIM 32-related	Autosomal recessive	LGMD2H	254110	TRIM32		
LGMD R9 FKRP-related	Autosomal recessive	LGMD2I	607155	FKRP	Congenital muscular dystrophy	An α-dystroglycanopathy
LGMD R10 titin-related	Autosomal recessive	LGMD2J	608807	TTN	Congenital myopathy	
LGMD R11 POMT1-related	Autosomal recessive	LGMD2K	609308	POMT1	Congenital muscular dystrophy	An α-dystroglycanopathy
LGMD R12 anoctamin5-related	Autosomal recessive	LGMD2L	611307	ANO5	Miyoshi myopathy type 3 (MMD3 - 613319)	
LGMD R13 Fukutin-related	Autosomal recessive	LGMD2M	611588	FKTN	Congenital muscular dystrophy	An α-dystroglycanopathy
LGMD R14 POMT2-related	Autosomal recessive	LGMD2N	607439	POMT2	Congenital muscular dystrophy	An α-dystroglycanopathy
LGMD R15 POMGnT1-related	Autosomal recessive	LGMD2O	606822	POMGNT1	Congenital muscular dystrophy	An α-dystroglycanopathy
LGMD R16 α-dystroglycan-related	Autosomal recessive	LGMD2P	613818	DAG1	Congenital muscular dystrophy	An α-dystroglycanopathy
LGMD R17 plectin-related	Autosomal recessive	LGMD2Q	613723	PLEC1		
LGMD R18 TRAPPC11-related	Autosomal recessive	LGMD2S	615356	TRAPPC11		
LGMD R19 GMPPB-related	Autosomal recessive	LGMD2T	615352	GMPPB	Congenital muscular dystrophy	An α-dystroglycanopathy
LGMD R20 ISPD-related	Autosomal recessive	LGMD2U	616052	ISPD	Congenital muscular dystrophy	An α-dystroglycanopathy
LGMD R21 POGLUT1-related	Autosomal recessive	LGMD2Z	617232	POGLUT1		
LGMD R22 collagen 6-related	Autosomal recessive	Bethlem myopathy 1	158810	COL6A1, COL6A2, COL6A3	Ullrich congenital muscular dystrophy 1; LGMD D5; Congenital myosclerosis (COL6A2)	
LGMD R23 laminin α2-related	Autosomal recessive	Laminin α2-related muscular dystrophy	156225	LAMA2	Congenital muscular dystrophy	
LGMD R24 POMGNT2-related	Autosomal recessive	POMGNT2-related muscular dystrophy	618135	POMGNT2	Congenital muscular dystrophy	An α-dystroglycanopathy
LGMD R25	Autosomal recessive	LGMD2X	616812	BVES		
LGMD R26	Autosomal recessive	n/a	618848	POPDC3		
LGMD R27	Autosomal recessive	n/a	619566	JAG2		
LGMD R28	Autosomal recessive	Myopathy, limb-girdle, adult-onset (MYPLG)	620375	HMGCR		
LGMD R(number pending)	Autosomal recessive	Myofibrillar myopathy 8 (MFM8)	617258	PYROXD1	Adult-onset Limb–girdle phenotype	

=== LGMD criteria ===
For a disease entity to be classified as an LGMD, the following criteria must be met:

- genetic, with an identifiable inheritance pattern such as autosomal dominant, autosomal recessive, digenic, or polygenic.
- relatively selective to skeletal muscle
- predominantly proximal muscle involvement
- independent walking is achieved at one point in life
- elevated serum creatine kinase
- muscle fiber loss
- dystrophic changes in muscle histology
- degenerative changes on medical imaging
- end-stage pathology seen in the most affected muscles
- described in at least two unrelated families

=== Differential diagnosis ===
Many diseases can manifest similarly to LGMD. Dystrophinopathies, including Duchenne muscular dystrophy, Becker muscular dystrophy, and manifesting dystrophinopathy in female carriers, can present similarly to LGMD. Facioscapulohumeral muscular dystrophy can appear similarly, especially when it spares the facial muscles. Also in the differential are Emery–Dreifuss muscular dystrophies, Pompe disease, later-onset congenital myasthenic syndromes, and proximal-predominant hereditary motor neuropathies.

== Treatment ==
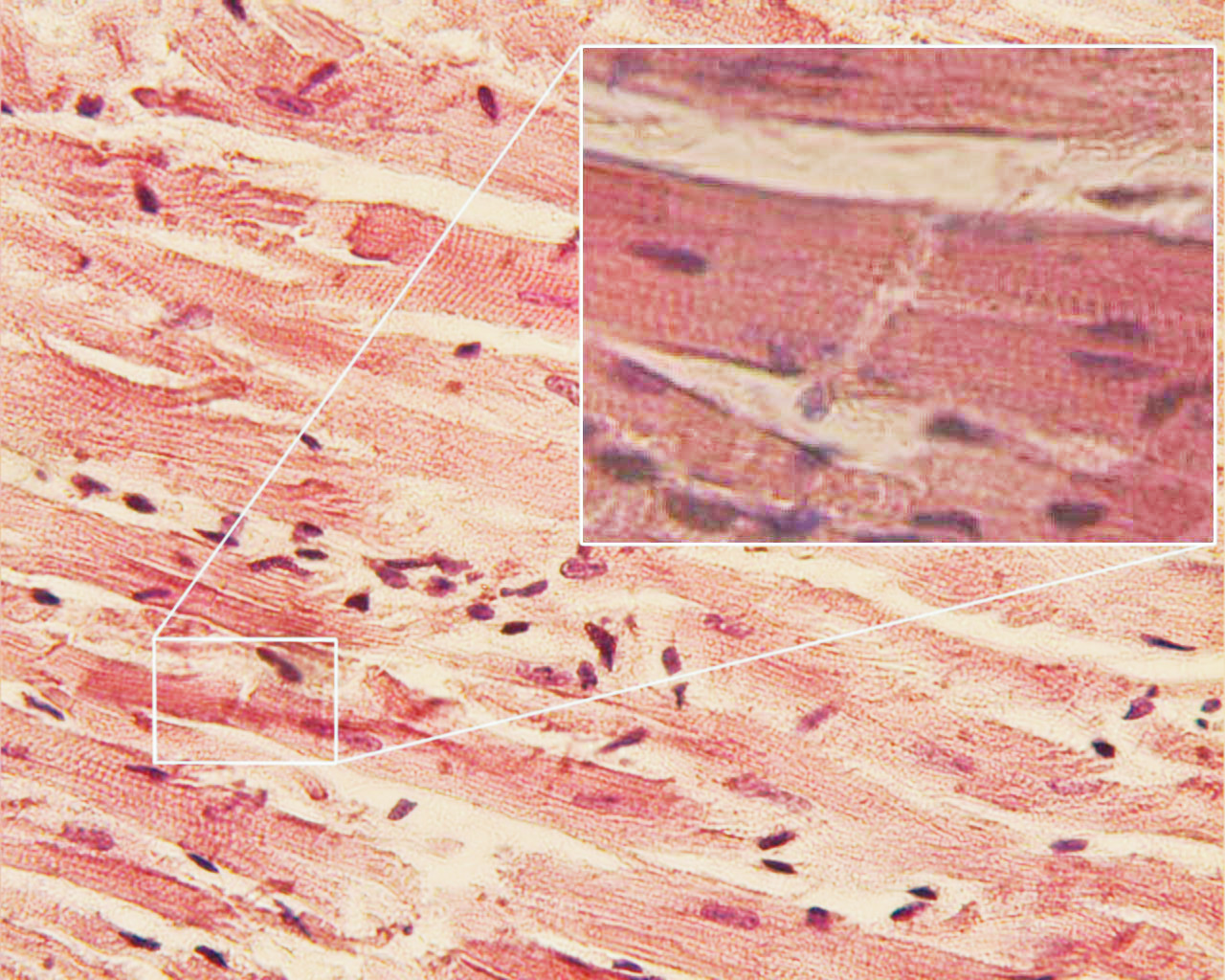
Cardiac muscle

Few studies corroborate the effectiveness of exercise for limb–girdle muscular dystrophy. Studies have shown that exercise can, in fact, damage muscles permanently due to intense muscle contraction. Physical therapy may be required to maintain as much muscle strength and joint flexibility as possible. Calipers may be used to maintain mobility and quality of life. Careful attention to lung and heart health is required, corticosteroids in LGMD 2C-F individuals, show some improvement. Additionally individuals can follow management that follows:

- Occupational therapy
- Respiratory therapy
- Speech therapy
- Neutralizing antibody to myostatin should not be pursued

The sarcoglycanopathies could be possibly amenable to gene therapy.

== Prognosis ==
In terms of the prognosis of limb–girdle muscular dystrophy in its mildest form, affected individuals have near-normal muscle strength and function. LGMD isn't typically a fatal disease, though it may eventually weaken the heart and respiratory muscles, leading to illness or death due to secondary disorders.

== Epidemiology ==
The minimum prevalence of limb–girdle muscular dystrophy, as a group, likely ranges from 2.27–10 per 100,000 (1:44,000 to 1:10,000). LGMD is the fourth most common muscular dystrophy, after the dystrophinopathies, myotonic dystrophies, and facioscapulohumeral muscular dystrophy. The prevalence of individual LGMDs, as studied in the United States, in descending order, are those due to mutation of 1) CAPN3 (calpain-3), 2) dysferlin, 3) collagen VI, 4) sarcoglycans, 5) anoctamin 5, and 6) FKRP (fukutin-related protein). In Euroasia CAPN3 mutations are the most common cause of LGMD, however, in northern Europe mutations in FKRP are also very common. It is difficult to calculate the worldwide prevalence of even the most common LGMD types, due to the founder effect causing varying prevalence by region. The less common types are very rare, often only described is limited regions of the world.

== History ==
The term 'limb-girdle muscular dystrophy' was published in 1954, describing a group of heterogeneous conditions that clinicians noticed to be distinct from Duchenne muscular dystrophy, facioscapulohumeral muscular dystrophy, and myotonic dystrophy. The genetics of LGMDs began to be understood in the late 1900s, which led the European Neuromuscular Centre (ENMC) to establish a consensus on the classification of LGMDs in 1995. The classification scheme at that time denoted autosomal dominant LGMDs as 'LGMD1' and autosomal recessive LGMDs as 'LGMD2.' A letter was appended to the names of LGMDs according to the order of discovery of the causal genetic mutation. As LGMD2Z was established, the question arose of what letter to assign the next discovered LGMD2. With this issue, among other motives, the ENMC established a new consensus on the classification and definition of LGMD in 2017. With the new definition, several diseases were removed from the LGMD category:

Diseases previously classified as LGMD until the 2017 consensus on LGMD criteria
Current name	Old Name	OMIM	Gene	Locus	Reason for exclusion
Myofibrillar myopathy 3 (MFM3)	LGMD1A	609200	MYOT		Distal weakness
Emery–Dreifuss muscular dystrophy 2, autosomal dominant (EDMD2)	LGMD1B	181350	LMNA		EDMD phenotype and significant cardiac involvement
Rippling muscle disease 2	LGMD1C	606072	CAV3		Mainly characterized by muscle rippling and pain
Myofibrillar myopathy 1 (MFM1)	LGMD1D & LGMD2R	601419	DES		Distal weakness and significant cardiac involvement
Not yet given new nomenclature	LGMD1H	613530	unknown	3p23–p25.1	"False linkage" Possibly mitochondrial myopathy
Pompe disease (Glycogen storage disease type 2)	LGMD2V	232300	GAA		Known disease entity, histological changes
Muscular dystrophy, autosomal recessive, with cardiomyopathy and triangular tongue (MDRCMTT)	LGMD2W	616827	LIMS2		One known family
Muscular dystrophy, autosomal recessive, with rigid spine and distal joint contractures (MRRSDC)	LGMD2Y	617072	TOR1AIP1		One known family

== Research ==
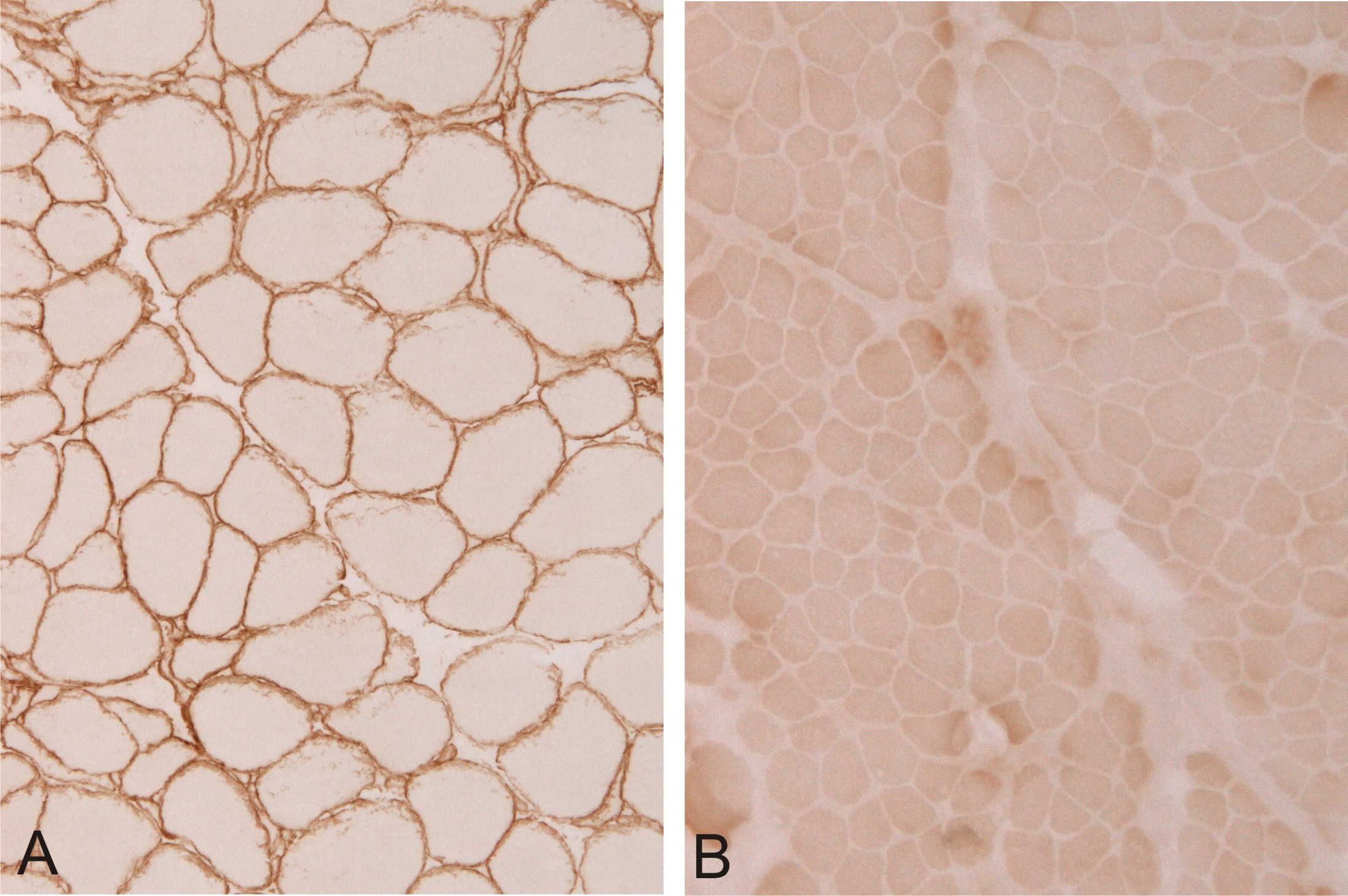
alpha sarcoglycan Left side-normal muscle /right side LGMD2

There is a variety of research underway targeted at various forms of limb-girdle muscular dystrophy. Among the treatments thought to hold promise is gene therapy, which is the delivery of genetic material, often a copy of a healthy gene, into cells.According to a review by Bengtsson et al., some success with AAV-mediated gene therapies (for different disorders) has increased interest in researchers, with CRISPR/Cas9 and exon-skipping helping these therapeutic goals along. Limb-girdle muscular dystrophies have many different types which are due to different gene mutations. LGMD2D is caused by a mutation in the α-sarcoglycan gene. Future treatment could be had by gene therapy through recombinant adeno-associated vectors.

According to a review by Straub, et al., several research issues need to be addressed: the rareness of the disease, poor understanding of the mechanism of LGMD R, and absence of patient cohorts, all contributing to the lack of biomarkers for LGMD. The review states that animal models for LGMD R have been used to analyze therapeutic medications. Also, although prednisone has been used and has had positive effects on affected LGMD2 individuals, there is still no evidence of its effectiveness in trials that are placebo-controlled.

== See also ==
- Muscle atrophy
