= Michel Fardeau =

French researcher (1929–2024)

- Born: October 24, 1929
- Died: December 6, 2024 (aged 95)

Michel Fardeau (24 October 1929 – 6 December 2024) was a French researcher in medical pathology, and a pioneering founder in France of myology, a medical discipline treating diseases of the neuromuscular system. He was also a full professor at the Conservatoire National des Arts et Métiers in a chair dedicated to the social integration of disabled people.

== Biography ==
Michel Fardeau was born in Paris on 24 October 1929. He was a student at the Lycée Voltaire and then completed his secondary studies from 1939 to 1945 at the Collège du Blanc (Indre). Major at the PCB (section C) in 1946, he was an external then Internal of the Paris Hospitals (1954) then Chief of Clinic (1959-1960). He joined the CNRS at the end of his internship, where he spent his entire scientific career, from trainee (1959) to Research Director (1977). He was also a Research Fellow of the National Institutes for Health (NIH) in Bethesda (USA), (1967-1968).

In 1960, he created an Electron Microscopy laboratory at La Salpêtrière to study human neuromuscular pathology. This laboratory will become the CNRS Research Team in 1971, then the Inserm Research Unit from 1976 to 1998. On this date, he became the first Medical and Scientific Director of the new Institute of Myology, created by the French Agency against Myopathies (AFM-Telethon) at the Hospital de la Pitié Salpêtrière. In 1990, Michel Fardeau was elected as Full Professor in a newly created Chair of the Conservatoire National des Arts et Métiers, dedicated to the Social Integration of People with Disabilities, which he will hold until 2002.

Michel Fardeau has chaired numerous Scientific Boards at the University of Paris VI and abroad. He was a member of the Inserm Scientific Management College from 1982 to 1994. He was a member of the French National Consultative Ethics Committee (1986-1990) and then Chairman of the Ethics Committee in Medical Research and Health (2000-2003).

He was a member of many Societies of Neurology and Neuropathology throughout the world and was elected Corresponding Member of the American Neurological Association (1995), the French Academy of sciences (1996) and Full Member of the French Academy of Technologies (1999). He received the Vermeil Medal of the City of Paris (2013), and the Grand Medal of the French Academy of Medicine (2014). He was an honorary doctor of the University of Mons Hainaut (2004).

Fardeau died on 6 December 2024, at the age of 95.

== Scientific contribution ==
Michel Fardeau devoted his entire scientific life to the analysis and treatment of human neuromuscular diseases. His work has focused in particular on the clinical and morphological analysis of congenital myopathies defined by structural anomalies of muscle fibres. He is credited with key descriptions in the field of cardiomyopathies with desmin overload, severe autosomal recessive myopathies in children with adhaline deficiency (gamma - sarcoglycan), congenital muscular dystrophies of toddlers with merosin deficiency, and limb-girdle muscular dystrophies in juveniles, rediscovered in a genetic isolate from Reunion Island, with Calpain 3 deficiency, dystrophies subsequently found throughout the world.

This research has led to better detection and prevention of these genetic disorders, and to the first therapeutic, experimental (by cell transplantation) or human (first gene therapy trial using a dytrophin plasmid) advances in Duchenne myopathy.

In the field of disability, it was responsible for a Report on the Comparative and Prospective Analysis of Policies Implemented for People with Disabilities, a preparatory report for the 2005 Law on Equal Opportunities.

== Books ==
- L'Homme de chair: Editions Odile Jacob, 2005
- Passion Neurologie, Jules and Augusta Dejerine: Editions Odile Jacob, 2012

== Awards and honours ==
- Winner of the Grand Prize of the Athena-Institut de France Foundation; 1985
- Duchenne-Erb" Prize of the Deutsche Gesellschaft Bekämfung der Muskelkrankheiten, 1991
- International Prize "Gaetano Conte" (Basic Research), 1995
- Premio Ottorino Rossi, Pavia, 1996
- Swedish Society of Medicine Medal, 2000
- Lifetime Achievement Award (World Federation of Neurology), 2002
- Member of Academia Europaea (Physiology and Biophysics Section) 1995
- Corresponding member of the Academy of Sciences (Section of Biological and Medical Sciences) 1996
- Honorary Member of the Romanian Academy of Medical Sciences (1996)
- Full member (1999), then emeritus (2000) of the French Academy of Technologies
- Ordre national du Mérite, Chevalier, 1985
- Légion d'Honneur, Chevalier: 1989; Officer: 1998Fra
