= Familial cirrhosis =

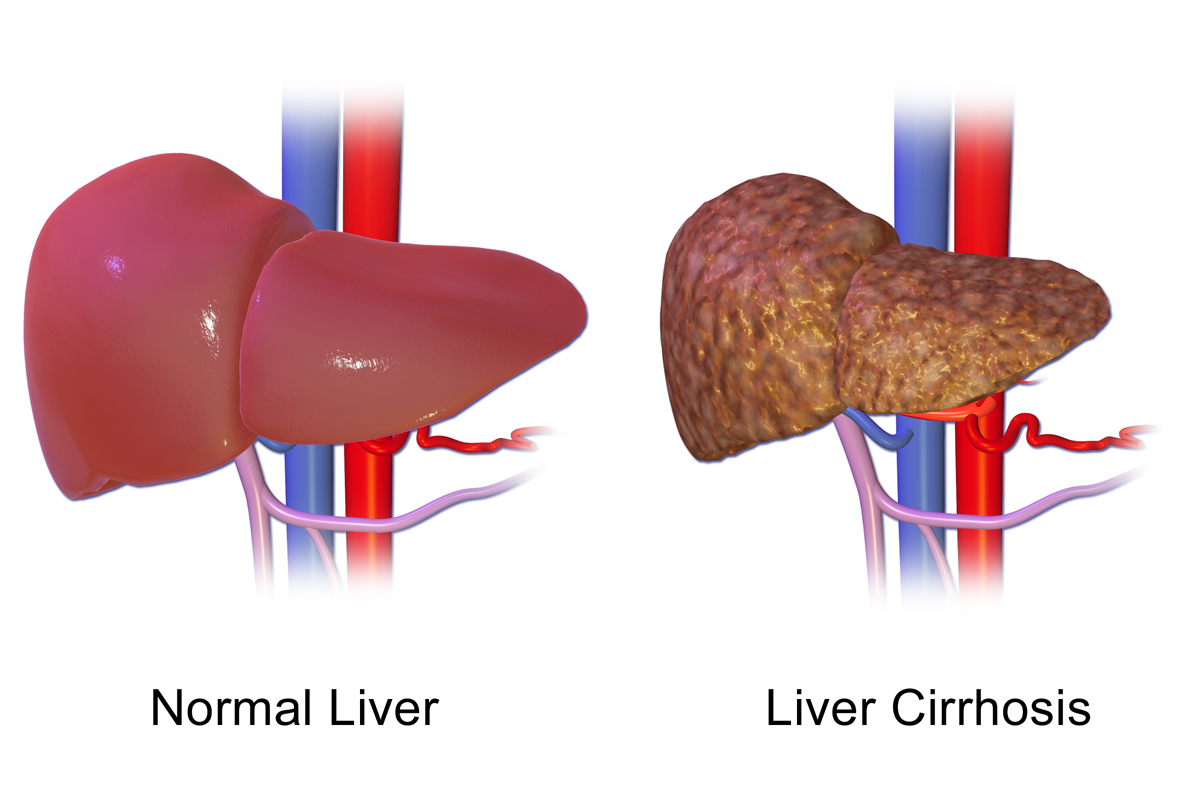
- Liver Cirrhosis.
- Specialty: Hepatology

Familial cirrhosis is a form of liver disease that is inherited and the liver scarring is not caused by any obvious disease process. This type of cirrhosis is a keratin disease. Damage progresses until function becomes impaired.

Current cirrhosis treatment is aimed at managing complications as well as chronic poor health related to liver damage. Treatments include abstinence from alcohol, nutritional supplement, identification of any identifiable disease process, management of portal hypertension, and liver transplantation.

It is associated with KRT8 and KRT18.

== See also ==
- Keratin disease
- Cirrhosis
