= C8orf48 =

Protein-coding gene in the species Homo sapiens

Identifiers
- Aliases: C8orf48, chromosome 8 open reading frame 48
- External IDs: MGI: 2142538; HomoloGene: 82747; GeneCards: C8orf48; OMA:C8orf48 - orthologs

Gene location (Human)
Chr.	Chromosome 8 (human)
Band	8p22	Start	13,566,869 bp
Band	8p22	End	13,568,288 bp

Gene location (Mouse)
Chr.	Chromosome 8 (mouse)
Band	8|8 A4	Start	37,460,758 bp
Band	8|8 A4	End	37,462,687 bp
RNA expression pattern
Bgee	Human / Mouse (ortholog); Top expressed in: testicle; Achilles tendon; stromal cell of endometrium; left testis; right coronary artery; left coronary artery; right testis; ventricular zone; thoracic aorta; Descending thoracic aorta / Top expressed in: spermatocyte; spermatid; seminiferous tubule; otolith organ; utricle; urothelium; transitional epithelium of urinary bladder; facial motor nucleus; vestibular membrane of cochlear duct; carotid body; More reference expression data
BioGPS	n/a
Orthologs
Species	Human	Mouse
Entrez	157773	621080
Ensembl	ENSG00000164743	ENSMUSG00000074384
UniProt	Q96LL4	Q3TTJ4
RefSeq (mRNA)	NM_001007090	NM_001039220
RefSeq (protein)	NP_001007091	NP_001034309
Location (UCSC)	Chr 8: 13.57 – 13.57 Mb	Chr 8: 37.46 – 37.46 Mb
PubMed search
- Wikidata
View/Edit Human	View/Edit Mouse

C8orf48 is a protein that in humans is encoded by the C8orf48 gene. C8orf48 is a nuclear protein specifically predicted to be located in the nuclear lamina. C8orf48 has been found to interact with proteins that are involved in the regulation of various cellular responses like gene expression, protein secretion, cell proliferation, and inflammatory responses. This protein has been linked to breast cancer and papillary thyroid carcinoma.

== Gene ==
C8orf48 is located on chromosome 8 (8p22) and spans from 13,566,843 to 13,568,288 on the positive strand. C8orf48 has an exon count of 1 and no introns. This protein does not have any isoforms nor exhibit any alternative splicing.

== Protein ==
The protein C8orf48 is 319 amino acids in length. The molecular weight of this protein is 36.9 kDa and the isoelectric point is 8.86. The C8orf48 protein is predicted to be a nuclear protein particularly located in the nuclear lamina. This protein does not possess any signal peptides or transmembrane domains. This protein has also been found to be fairly abundant in humans.

=== Structure ===
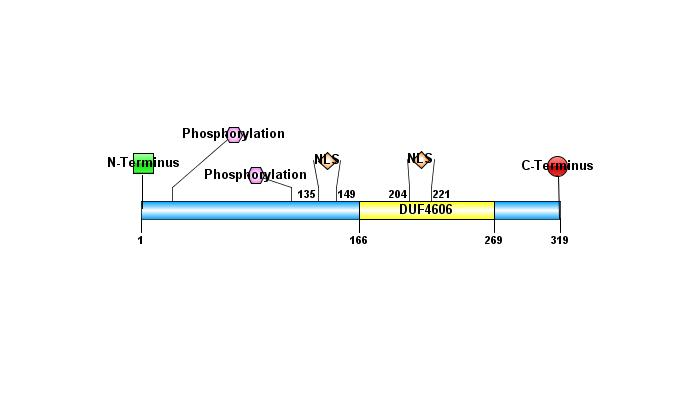

C8orf48 protein has two predicted nuclear localization signals one spanning from 135-149 amino acids and the other from 204-221. The secondary structure of C8orf48 protein is composed of primarily alpha-helices and coiled coils. The structure is composed of very little beta sheets, a total of three areas demonstrate possible beta sheet structure.

The Tertiary structure of C8orf48 was obtained from the iTASSER program.

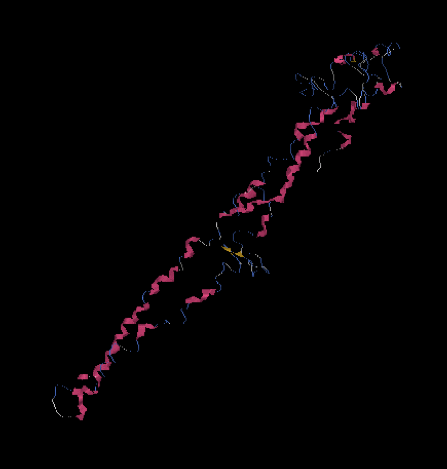

=== Post-translational modifications ===
C8orf48 has various predicted post-translational modifications. These post-translational modifications include O-glycosylation, Glycation, N-linked glycosylation, Phosphorylation Sites, Yin-Yang sites, sumoylation, and SUMO interactions.

=== Subcellular localization ===
PSORT II results determined that the protein C8orf48 does not have a signalPeptide as well as no transmembrane domains. The prediction is that C8orf48 is most likely nuclear and potentially cytoplasmic. When comparing orthologs of C8orf48 we see very similar results, the protein is predicted to be localized in the nucleus predominantly and secondly predicted to be localized in the cytoplasm. Further sub-cellular localization analysis was done through the use of CELLO. These results also support the notion that C8orf48 is localized in the nucleus.

== Homology ==
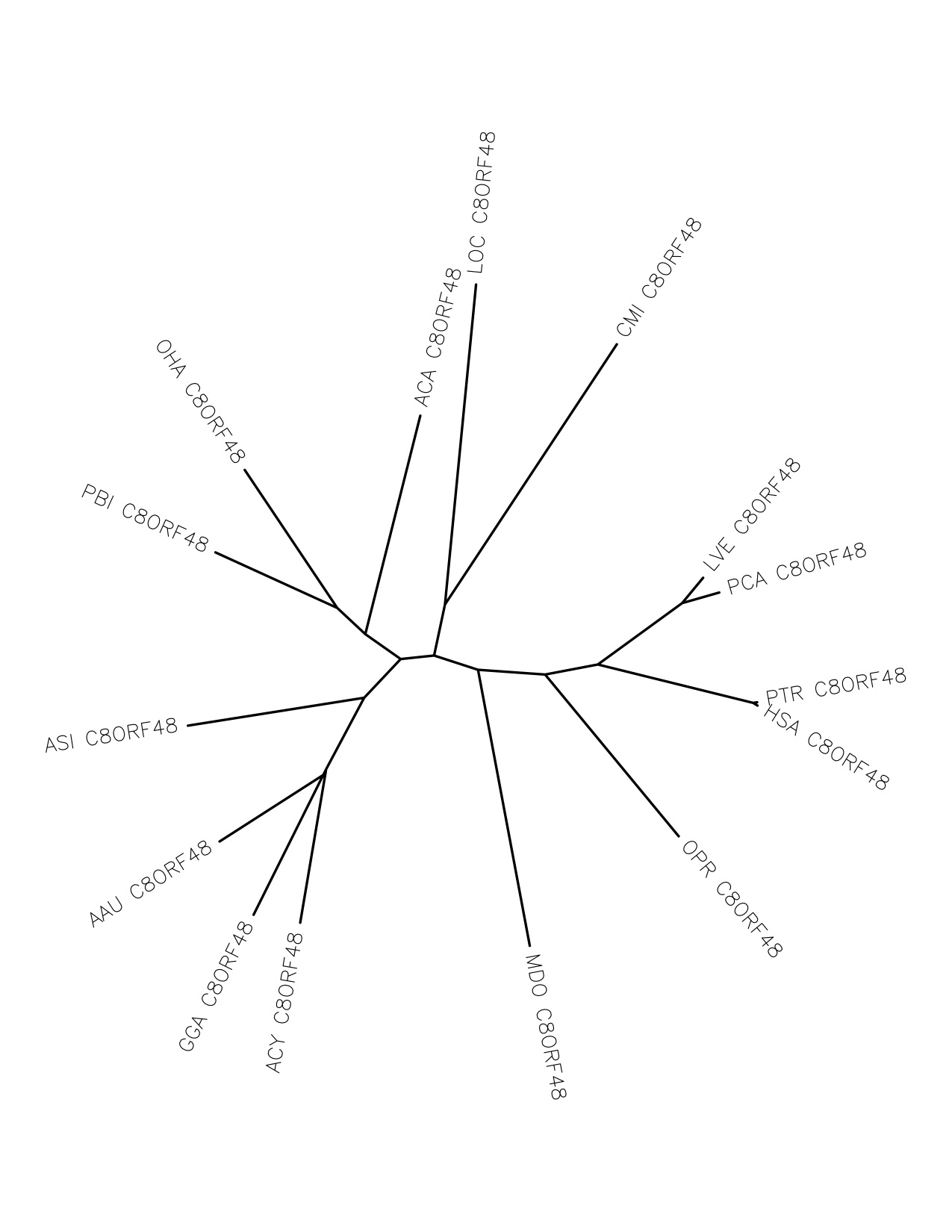
Phylogenetic Tree of C8orf48 (Unrooted)

C8orf48 is conserved in mammals, amphibians, reptiles, aves, and fish. C8orf48 orthologs were unable to be found in bacteria, archea, plants, and fungi. There were no human paralogs found of C8orf48. Certain portions of the DUF 4606 domain is highly conserved in the orthologs.

== Expression ==
This gene has been found to be overly expressed in the tissues of the testis and colon muscle, as well as expressed in 76 developmental stages. C8orf48 has been found to be expressed most often in the bladder, bone, heart, larynx, testis, and thyroid. In regards to the developmental stages, C8orf48 was most often found in the embroid body.

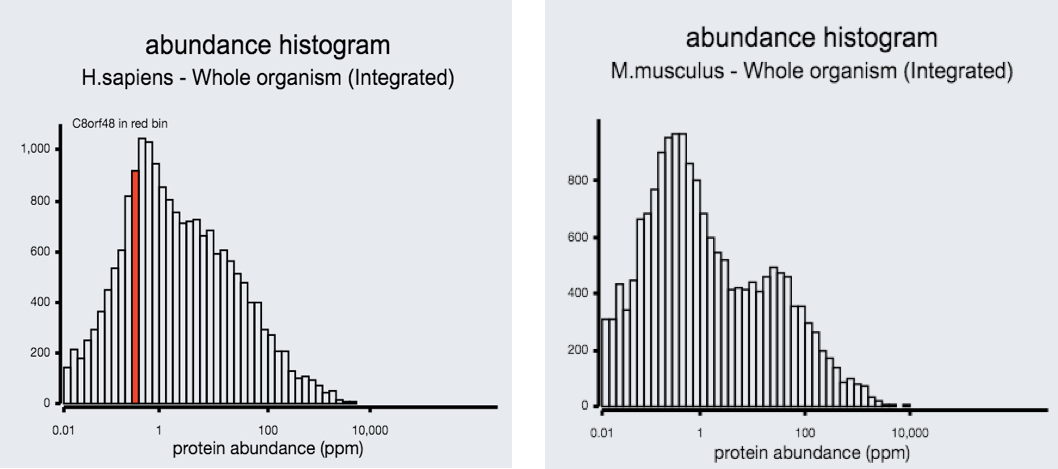

=== GEO profiles ===
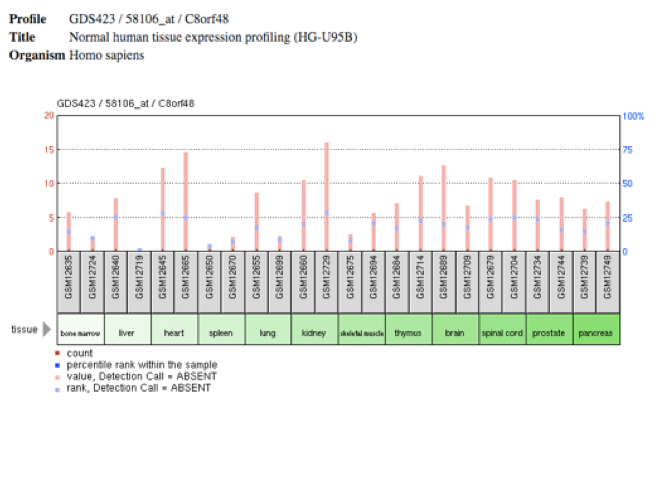
Differential Tissue Expression of C8orf48

In a study regarding multiple myeloma bone marrow mesenchymal stromal cells shows that the expression of C8orf48 is lower in the disease state cells in comparison to healthy cells. the opposite is demonstrated in the GeoProfile regarding Endometriosis, in this study, it was found that C8orf48 levels are higher in the disease state than in the healthy state. Other studies demonstrate differential expression of Papillary Thyroid cancer and Estrogen Receptor alpha-silenced MCF7 breast cancer cells. In control samples the levels of C8orf48 were lower than that of those with the Estrogen receptor knockdown.

== Regulation of expression ==
The transcription factors that act on C8orf48 are presented in Table 1. The majority of the transcription factors are involved in cell growth, proliferation, or regulation of cell migration. This implies that C8orf48 may play a role in the cell cycle. A few of the transcription factors presented themselves more than once, on both the positive and negative strand. These transcription factors include MAX binding protein and Estrogen-related receptor alpha (secondary DNA binding preference) both of which are involved in cell growth.

Transcription Factor	Function
Myeloid zinc finger protein MZF1	Found to be expressed in hematopoietic progenitor cells that are committed to myeloid lineage differentiation. It contains 13 C2H2 zinc fingers arranged in two domains that are separated by a short glycine- and proline-rich sequence.
Zinc finger with KRAB and SCAN domains 3	It is mainly located in the nucleus although during starvation periods it relocates to the cytoplasm. This allows for expression of target genes involved in autophagy and lysosome biogenesis/function. Acts as a repressor of autophagy and has been found and promote cancer cell progression and/or migration in various tumors and myelomas.
T-box transcription factor TBX20	Found to be involved in the regulation of a genetic program for cranial motor neuron cell body migration.
Kruppel-like zinc finger protein 219	Found to be involved in the regulation of chondrocyte differentiation by assembling a transcription factory with Sox9.
KRAB-containing zinc finger protein 300	Research links the transcriptional repression mediated by the KRAB-ZFPs to cell proliferation, differentiation, apoptosis and cancer. Believed to have evolved recently.
Krueppel-like factor 2 (lung) (LKLF)	KLF2 regulates T-cell trafficking by promoting the expression of S1P1 that is a lipid-binding receptor. This transcription factor binds to the CACCC box in the promoter sequence.
Estrogen-related receptor alpha (secondary DNA binding preference)	The expression of this has been shown to have a negative prognostic significance in breast and ovarian cancers. Said to be critical for the growth of Estrogen receptor negative breast cancer.
AREB6 (Atp1a1 regulatory element binding factor 6)	AREB6’s structure is composed of two zinc-finger clusters in N- and C-terminal regions, and one homeodomain in the middle. It has been found to regulate the expression of the Na, K-ATPase α1 subunit, interleukin 2 and δ-crystallin genes.
MAX binding protein	Transcriptional repressor and an antagonist of Myc-dependent transcriptional activation and cell growth.
Leucine rich repeat (in FLII) interacting protein 1	A transcriptional repressor that potentially regulates TNF, EGFR and PDGFA. Possibly involved in the control of smooth muscle cell proliferation following artery injury.
E2F transcription factor 1	Plays an important role in the control of the cell cycle and tumor suppressor proteins. Also found to be the target of transforming proteins of small DNA tumor viruses. Lastly, it can mediate cell proliferation and p53-dependent/independent apoptosis.
Kruppel-like factor 7 (ubiquitous, UKLF)	Members of the family it pertains to are responsible for the regulation of cell proliferation, differentiation, and survival. Found to possibly contribute to the progression of type 2 diabetes by inhibiting the expression of insulin, secretion in pancreatic beta-cells, and by deregulating adipocytokine secretion in adipocytes.
CCAAT/enhancer binding protein (C/EBP), epsilon	Important for terminal differentiation and functional maturation of committed granulocyte progenitor cells. Mutations in the gene that encodes this protein has been found to be associated with Specific Granule Deficiency.
Zinc finger / POZ domain transcription factor	The POZ domain is a conserved protein-protein interaction motif found in transcription factors, oncogenic proteins, ion channel proteins, and some actin-associated proteins.
Oligodendrocyte lineage transcription factor 2	Tends to be expressed in oligodendrocyte tumors in the brain. This protein is an essential regulator of ventral neuroectodermal progenitor cell fate and chromosomal translocation t(14;21)(q11.2;q22) associated with T-cell acute lymphoblastic leukemia.
Basic krueppel-like factor (KLF3)	One of its related pathways is transcriptional regulation in cancer, and may possibly have a role in hematopoiesis. Binds to the CACCC box of erythroid cell-expressed genes.

== Protein interactions ==
The proteins that interact with C8orf48 include Deleted In Liver Cancer 1 Protein (DLC1), MyoD Family Inhibitor (MDFI), Zinc Finger Protein 14 (ZNF14), and Sacroglycan Zeta (SGCZ). All of these protein interactions were found experimentally via a two-hybrid pooling approach, two-hybrid array, or two-hybrid screen.

== Clinical significance ==
C8orf48 has been found in studies regarding various types of carcinoma. Different C8orf48 expression levels have been found in Papillary Thyroid cancer and Estrogen Receptor alpha-silenced MCF7 breast cancer cells.
