= 1,2-alpha-mannosidase =

1,2-alpha-mannosidase may refer to:

- alpha-Mannosidase, an enzyme
- Mannosyl-oligosaccharide 1,2-alpha-mannosidase, an enzyme
