= Kifunensine =

Names
- Preferred IUPAC name (5R,6R,7S,8R,8aS)-6,7,8-Trihydroxy-5-(hydroxymethyl)hexahydroimidazo[1,2-a]pyridine-2,3-dione

Identifiers
| CAS Number | 109944-15-2 |
| 3D model (JSmol) | Interactive image |
| ChemSpider | 115533 |
| ECHA InfoCard | 100.162.542 |
| PubChem CID | 130611 |
| UNII | 0NI8960271 |
| CompTox Dashboard (EPA) | DTXSID60883199 |
- InChI: InChI=1S/C8H12N2O6/c11-1-2-3(12)4(13)5(14)6-9-7(15)8(16)10(2)6/h2-6,11-14H,1H2,(H,9,15)/t2-,3-,4+,5+,6+/m1/s1 Key: OIURYJWYVIAOCW-PQMKYFCFSA-N; InChI=1/C8H12N2O6/c11-1-2-3(12)4(13)5(14)6-9-7(15)8(16)10(2)6/h2-6,11-14H,1H2,(H,9,15)/t2-,3-,4+,5+,6+/m1/s1 Key: OIURYJWYVIAOCW-PQMKYFCFBW
- SMILES: C([C@@H]1[C@H]([C@@H]([C@@H]([C@@H]2N1C(=O)C(=O)N2)O)O)O)O

Properties
| Chemical formula | C_{8}H_{12}N_{2}O_{6} |
| Molar mass | 232.192 g·mol^{−1} |
| Solubility in water | Soluble to 50 mM in water with gentle warming, though it is slow to dissolve |
- Except where otherwise noted, data are given for materials in their standard state (at 25 °C [77 °F], 100 kPa). Infobox references

Kifunensine is an alkaloid originally isolated from Kitasatosporia kifunense, an actinobacterium (formerly called an actinomycete). It is a neutral, stable compound.

Kifunensine is a potent inhibitor of the mannosidase I enzyme and is primarily used in cell culture to make high mannose glycoproteins. Inside a cell, it prevents endoplasmic reticulum mannosidase I (ERM1) from trimming mannose residues from precursor glycoproteins. Kifunensine shows no inhibitory action against mannosidase II or the endoplasmic reticulum alpha-mannosidase, and it weakly inhibits arylmannosidase.

When incorporated in cell culture media, kifunensine has shown no significant impact on cell growth or glycoprotein production yield.

Kifunensine has shown potential for treatment of sarcoglycanopathies and lysosomal storage disorders.

== History ==
Kifunensine was first isolated by Iwami et al. in 1987, and described as a new type of immunoactive substance. It was originally prepared by culturing the actinobacterium Kitasatosporia kifunense in a suitable medium at 25–33 °C for several days, followed by extraction of the alkaloid.

The structure of kifunensine was published in 1989 by Kayakiri et al.

== Enzyme inhibition ==
Kifunensine is a potent inhibitor of the mannosidase I enzyme. It is 50 to 100 times more potent than deoxymannojirimycin – an alkaloid with a similar structure. Kifunensine inhibits human endoplasmic reticulum α-1,2-mannosidase I and Golgi Class I mannosidases IA, IB and IC with Ki values of 130 and 23 nM, respectively.

Being a neutral molecule (cf other mannosidase inhibitors such as deoxymannojirimycin), it can permeate inside cells. Once inside a cell, kifunensine blocks endoplasmic reticulum (ER) mannosidase I (ERM1). This blocks processing of glycoproteins in the ER, to leave them with glycoforms with mainly nine mannose residues attached to two N-acetylglucosamine residues (Man9GlcNAc2).

The addition of 5–20 μM kifunensine to mammalian cell culture media is sufficient to achieve complete mannosidase I inhibition.

Kifunensine does not inhibit mannosidase II or the endoplasmic reticulum alpha-mannosidase. It weakly inhibits arylmannosidase.

== Synthesis ==
Kayakiri et al. published a synthesis of kifunensine from D-glucose in 1990 and a synthesis of 8-epi-kifunensine in 1991. A synthesis of kifunensine and some analogues, from L-ascorbic acid, was published by Hering et al. in 2005. Kifunensine is now made by GlycoSyn in a commercial process from N-acetylmannosamine in eight steps via a patented process.

== Uses ==
=== Production of high mannose glycoproteins in cell culture ===
Kifunensine's inhibitory action has led to its use in the preparation of high mannose glycoproteins by culture of transformed mammalian cells. It is easier to modify the glycosylation of a glycoprotein by using a culture media ingredient with an existing transformed cell line than by generating a new cell line, especially if many cell lines or leads are being screened.

=== Therapeutic uses ===
Kifunensine's use as a therapeutic is currently being researched in several conditions that benefit from its ability to inhibit mannosidase I.

==== Sarcoglycanopathies ====
Sarcoglycanopathies are autosomal recessive muscular disorders of the Limb–girdle Muscular Dystrophy (LMGD) group. Four forms, LGMD 2C, 2D, 2E and 2F have been identified, which result from defects in the γ-, α-, β- and δ-sarcoglycan genes. There are fewer than 1,500 patients with sarcoglycanopathy in the European Union.

In cell-based assays and in an animal model, kifunensine was found to be particularly suited to addressing LGMD 2D (R77C substitution), which has been diagnosed in patients in Europe, Africa, Japan and Brazil.

Kifunensine was granted orphan drug status for the treatment of each of γ-, α-, β- and δ-sarcoglycanopathy by the European Medicines Agency in October 2011.

A patent for the treatment of sarcoglycanopathies is held by Genethon. Claim 11 relates to the use of kifunensine as an inhibitor of the endoplasmic reticulum associated degradation (ERAD) pathway, particularly of mannosidase I. The development of kifunensine was put on hold due to side effects that need further analysis.

==== Lysosomal storage disorders ====
In the lysosomal storage disorders – Gaucher's disease and Tay–Sachs disease – endoplasmic reticulum-associated degradation (ERAD) prevents the native folding of mutated lysosomal enzymes in a patient's fibroblasts.

Kifunensine, given in very low concentration (50 nM), inhibits the endoplasmic reticulum mannosidase I and interferes with early substrate recognition, prolonged ER retention and substrate folding. It did not cause irremediably misfolded proteins to accumulate or induce apoptosis in the cells. In addition, the combination of ERAD inhibition using kifunensine with proteostasis modulation (MG-132 = Z-Leu-Leu-Leu-al) to enhance the cellular folding capacity, resulted in the synergistic rescue of mutated enzymes.

A patent held by Rice University makes the following claims:

- #9 : A method comprising administering to a subject a therapeutically effective amount of at least one inhibitor of ER-associated degradation
- #10 : The method of claim 9 wherein the subject has Gaucher's disease or Tay–Sachs disease
- #11 : The method of claim 9 wherein the inhibitor is eeyarestatin I or kifunensine.
