= SGCG =

Protein-coding gene in the species Homo sapiens

Identifiers
- Aliases: SGCG, A4, DAGA4, DMDA, DMDA1, LGMD2C, MAM, SCARMD2, SCG3, TYPE, 35DAG, gamma-SG, sarcoglycan gamma, LGMDR5
- External IDs: OMIM: 608896; MGI: 1346524; GeneCards: SGCG

Gene location (Human)
Chr.	Chromosome 13 (human)
Band	13q12.12	Start	23,180,979 bp
Band	13q12.12	End	23,325,162 bp

Gene location (Mouse)
Chr.	Chromosome 14 (mouse)
Band	14|14 D1	Start	61,456,564 bp
Band	14|14 D1	End	61,495,939 bp
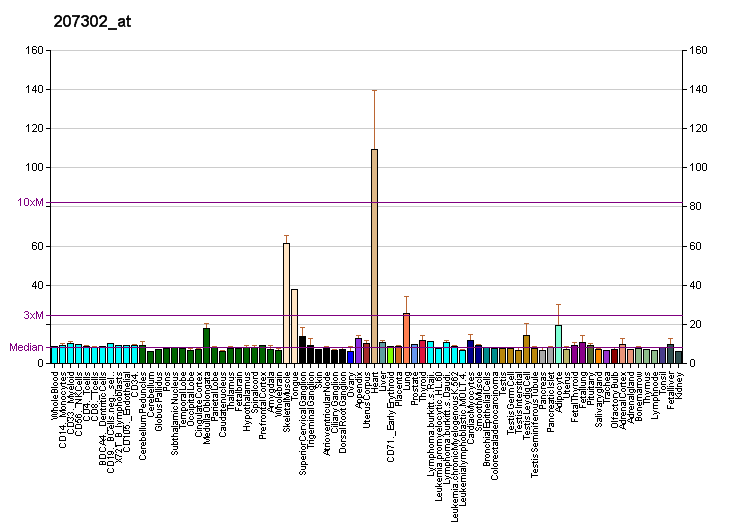
RNA expression pattern
Bgee	Human / Mouse (ortholog); Top expressed in: Skeletal muscle tissue of rectus abdominis; glutes; triceps brachii muscle; biceps brachii; Skeletal muscle tissue of biceps brachii; myocardium of left ventricle; thoracic diaphragm; vastus lateralis muscle; cardiac muscle tissue of right atrium; right ventricle / Top expressed in: temporal muscle; soleus muscle; sternocleidomastoid muscle; interventricular septum; vastus lateralis muscle; myocardium of ventricle; masseter muscle; right ventricle; digastric muscle; plantaris muscle; More reference expression data
BioGPS	More reference expression data
Gene ontology
Molecular function	protein binding
Cellular component	cytoplasm; integral component of membrane; dystroglycan complex; cytoskeleton; membrane; sarcolemma; plasma membrane; nucleoplasm; sarcoglycan complex
Biological process	muscle organ development; membrane organization; heart contraction; muscle cell development; cardiac muscle tissue development
Sources:Amigo / QuickGO
Orthologs
Databases	NCBI: entry; OMA: entry
Species	Human	Mouse
Entrez	6445	24053
Ensembl	ENSG00000102683	ENSMUSG00000035296
UniProt	Q13326	P82348
RefSeq (mRNA)	NM_000231; NM_001378244; NM_001378245; NM_001378246	NM_011892
RefSeq (protein)	NP_000222; NP_001365173; NP_001365174; NP_001365175	NP_036022
Location (UCSC)	Chr 13: 23.18 – 23.33 Mb	Chr 14: 61.46 – 61.5 Mb
PubMed search
- Wikidata
View/Edit Human	View/Edit Mouse

Gamma-sarcoglycan is a protein that in humans is encoded by the SGCG gene. The α to δ-sarcoglycans are expressed predominantly (β) or exclusively (α, γ and δ) in striated muscle. A mutation in any of the sarcoglycan genes may lead to a secondary deficiency of the other sarcoglycan proteins, presumably due to destabilisation of the sarcoglycan complex. The disease-causing mutations in the α to δ genes cause disruptions within the dystrophin-associated protein (DAP) complex in the muscle cell membrane. The transmembrane components of the DAP complex link the cytoskeleton to the extracellular matrix in adult muscle fibres, and are essential for the preservation of the integrity of the muscle cell membrane.

== Function ==
Gamma-sarcoglycan is one of several sarcolemmal transmembrane glycoproteins that interact with dystrophin, probably to provide a link between the membrane associated cytoskeleton and the extracellular matrix. Defects in the protein can lead to early onset autosomal recessive muscular dystrophy, in particular limb-girdle muscular dystrophy, type 2C (LGMD2C).

== Structure ==
=== Gene ===
Human SGCG gene maps to chromosome 13 at q12, spans over 100 kb of DNA and includes 8 exons.

=== Protein ===
Gamma-sarcoglycan is a type II transmembrane protein and consists of 291 amino acids. It has a 35 amino acid intracellular N-terminal region, a 25 amino acid single transmembrane domain, and a 231 amino acid extra-cellular C-terminus.

== Clinical significance ==
Sarcoglycanopathies are autosomal recessive limb girdle muscular dystrophies (LGMDs) caused by mutations in any of the four sarcoglycan genes: α (LGMD2D), β (LGMD2E), γ (LGMD2C) and δ (LGMD2F). Severe childhood autosomal recessive muscular dystrophy (SCARMD) is a progressive muscle-wasting disorder that segregates with microsatellite markers at γ-sarcoglycan gene. Mutations in the γ-sarcoglycan gene were first described in the Maghreb countries of North Africa, where γ-sarcoglycanopathy has a higher than usual incidence. One common mutation, Δ-521T, which causes a severe phenotype, occurs both in the Maghreb population and in other countries. A Cys283Tyr mutation has been identified in the Gypsy population causing a severe phenotype and a Leu193Ser mutation which causes a mild phenotype.

== Interactions ==
SGCG has been shown to interact with FLNC.
