= M30-Apoptosense ELISA =

M30 Apoptosense® ELISA is an enzyme-linked immunosorbent assay developed for the detection of soluble caspase-cleaved keratin 18 (ccK18, K18-Asp396, formerly cytokeratin 18, ccCK18 or CK18-Asp396).

== History ==
The M30 Apoptosense® ELISA is a PEVIVA product owned by VLVbio (Nacka, Sweden) and was developed in collaboration with the Karolinska Institute in 2000.

Distributors:

- In the United States and Canada, the Peviva products are distributed by DiaPharma Group, Inc
- In the United Kingdom, the products are distributed by bioaxxess
- China - Boppard CO., Ltd.
- Distributors in Japan - Funakoshi Co., Ltd
- In Germany, Switzerland and Benelux, the products are distributed by TECOmedical

== Uses ==
The M30 Apoptosense® ELISA is a non-invasive test for the detection of apoptosis of epithelially derived cells. Caspases are activated in apoptotic cells and cleave intracellular protein substrates. Keratin 18 (K18) is one such substrate, expressed by many epithelial cells (e.g. hepatocytes, intestinal cells, breast cells, prostate cells). Cleaved K18 is released into the circulation after cell death. The main uses of M30 Apoptosense® ELISA are to:

1. Measure apoptosis of tumor cells in response to cytotoxic drugs (breast, prostate and other forms of carcinomas).
2. Measure hepatocyte apoptosis to aid the diagnosis of non-alcoholic steatohepatitis (NASH) and steatosis in patients with hepatitis C virus infection.
3. Serve as a biomarkers of epithelial apoptosis in liver and intestinal graft-versus-host disease.

== Biology ==
Caspases cleave keratin 18 at two sites during apoptosis. Cleavage at Asp396 generates a neo-epitope recognized by the monoclonal antibody M30®. This antibody does not recognize uncleaved K18 and is therefore specific for apoptotic epithelial cells. M30 Apoptosense® ELISA utilizes a second monoclonal antibody (M5) which recognizes an epitope N-terminal from the M30® epitope.

M30 Apoptosense® ELISA can be combined with the M65® ELISA (uncleaved K18) (PEVIVA®, VLVbio) to determine cell death mode (apoptosis versus necrosis).

== Trademarks ==
There has been some confusion in the literature on the use of the term “M30”. Although it should be very clear that “M30” is a monoclonal antibody (“M”) that detects the antigen “ccK18”/“K18-Asp396” people sometimes refer to the antigen as “M30”. This is incorrect.

It is clear that the use of the term “M30” in connection with “keratin” means the monoclonal antibody M30® or (possibly, but erroneously) the neo-epitope DALD396 on K18 recognized by the M30® monoclonal. “M30” is not a biological entity expressed in cells but a (patent protected) monoclonal antibody.

Caspase-cleaved fragment of keratin 18 = ccK18

Keratin 18 = K18 (or CK18)

M30® = the antibody that recognizes a neoepitope on ccK18

M65® ELISA = an ELISA composed of two antibodies (M5 and M6) for conventional epitopes of K18

M30®, Apoptosense®, M65®, EpiDeath®, and PEVIVA® are registered trademarks, including U.S. Trademarks 4,577,969, 2,749,204, 1,009,048, and 896,269. Additionally, VLVBio™ holds additional Trademarks in most countries worldwide.
