= Mir-632 microRNA precursor family =

mir-632

Identifiers
- Symbol: mir-632
- Rfam: RF01010
- miRBase family: MIPF0000527

Other data
- RNA type: microRNA
- Domain(s): Eukaryota;
- PDB structures: PDBe

In molecular biology mir-632 microRNA is a short RNA molecule. MicroRNAs function to regulate the expression levels of other genes by several mechanisms.

== miR-632 and MDS ==
miR-632 has been identified as one of three key miRNAs associated with the anti-ageing myelodysplastic syndromes (MDS). In particular, its levels show high discrimination between MDS and normal controls, and expression is decreased in MDS. In this way it can be used as a potential diagnostic marker for MDS.

== DNAJB6 protein ==
miR-632 targets the coding region of the DNAJB6 protein, a member of the Heat Shock Protein 40 (HSP40) family which shows constitutive expression. DNAJB6 is known to be a negative regulator of tumour progression in breast cancer and its levels are compromised in advanced tumour progression. miR-632 has been linked to be downregulation of DNAJB6 and is capable of silencing both spliced variants of this protein. It is currently unknown whether miR-632 may be just one of many negative regulators controlling DNAJB6 levels.

== See also ==
- MicroRNA
