= POGLUT1 =

Identifiers
- Aliases: POGLUT1, C3orf9, CLP46, KDELCL1, KTELC1, MDSRP, Rumi, hCLP46, MDS010, protein O-glucosyltransferase 1, LGMD2Z, LGMDR21
- External IDs: OMIM: 615618; MGI: 2444232; GeneCards: POGLUT1
Enzyme activity
EC #	BRENDA	ExPASy	KEGG	MetaCyc
2.4.1.376	↗	↗	↗	↗
2.4.2.26	↗	↗	↗	↗
2.4.2.63	↗	↗	↗	↗

Gene location (Human)
Chr.	Chromosome 3 (human)
Band	3q13.33	Start	119,468,963 bp
Band	3q13.33	End	119,494,708 bp

Gene location (Mouse)
Chr.	Chromosome 16 (mouse)
Band	16|16 B4	Start	38,525,137 bp
Band	16|16 B4	End	38,550,258 bp
RNA expression pattern
Bgee	Human / Mouse (ortholog); Top expressed in: seminal vesicula; stromal cell of endometrium; monocyte; gonad; lymph node; body of pancreas; rectum; skin of abdomen; buccal mucosa cell; body of uterus / Top expressed in: saccule; otic vesicle; otic placode; genital tubercle; ventricular zone; tail of embryo; interventricular septum; facial motor nucleus; visual cortex; central gray substance of midbrain; More reference expression data
BioGPS	n/a
Gene ontology
Molecular function	protein xylosyltransferase activity; transferase activity; glucosyltransferase activity; glycosyltransferase activity; UDP-glucosyltransferase activity; UDP-xylosyltransferase activity
Cellular component	endoplasmic reticulum lumen; endoplasmic reticulum
Biological process	protein glycosylation; protein O-linked glycosylation; regulation of Notch signaling pathway; glycolipid metabolic process; axial mesoderm development; paraxial mesoderm development; somitogenesis; multicellular organism development; gastrulation; regulation of gastrulation; protein O-linked glycosylation via serine; muscle tissue development; positive regulation of Notch signaling pathway
Sources:Amigo / QuickGO
Orthologs
Databases	NCBI: entry; OMA: entry
Species	Human	Mouse
Entrez	56983	224143
Ensembl	ENSG00000163389	ENSMUSG00000034064
UniProt	Q8NBL1	Q8BYB9
RefSeq (mRNA)	NM_152305	NM_001300827; NM_172380
RefSeq (protein)	NP_689518	NP_001287756; NP_759012
Location (UCSC)	Chr 3: 119.47 – 119.49 Mb	Chr 16: 38.53 – 38.55 Mb
PubMed search
- Wikidata
View/Edit Human	View/Edit Mouse

Protein O-Glucosyltransferase 1 is an enzyme which is encoded by the gene POGLUT1.

== Gene ==
The POGLUT1 gene is located on the long arm (q) of chromosome 3 on position 13.33, from base pair from base pair 119,468,963 to base pair 119,494,708.

== Function ==
This enzyme is located in the endoplasmic reticulum (ER), which has O-glucosyltransferase activity on Notch proteins.

== Clinical significance ==
Mutations in this gene causes autosomal recessive form of Limb-Girdle muscular dystrophy and Dowling-Degos disease.
