= Filamin-C =

Protein-coding gene in the species Homo sapiens

FLNC
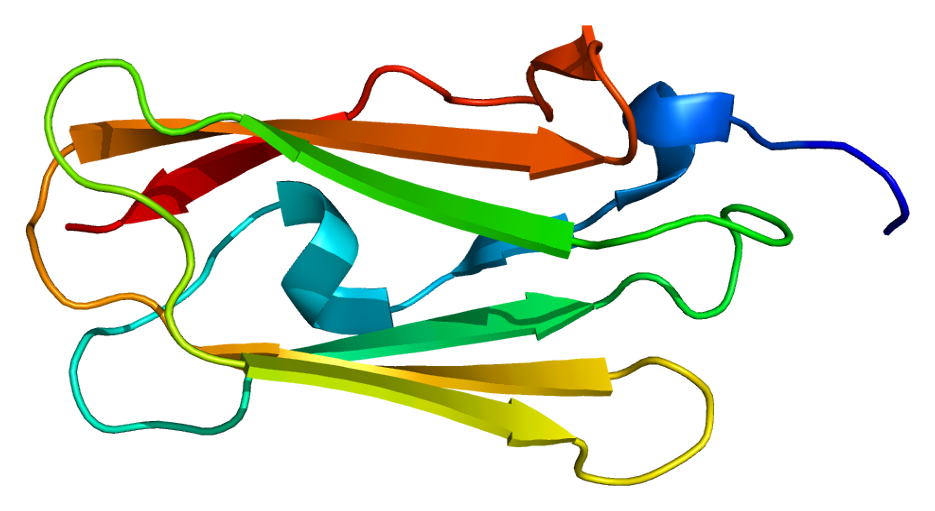

Identifiers
- Aliases: FLNC, ABP-280, ABP280A, ABPA, ABPL, FLN2, MFM5, MPD4, filamin C, RCM5, CMH26
- External IDs: OMIM: 102565; MGI: 95557; GeneCards: FLNC
Available structures
PDB	Ortholog search: PDBe RCSB
PDB	List of PDB id codes 1V05, 2D7M, 2D7N, 2D7O, 2D7P, 2D7Q, 2K9U, 2NQC, 3V8O, 4MGX

Gene location (Human)
Chr.	Chromosome 7 (human)
Band	7q32.1	Start	128,830,406 bp
Band	7q32.1	End	128,859,274 bp

Gene location (Mouse)
Chr.	Chromosome 6 (mouse)
Band	6 A3.3|6 12.36 cM	Start	29,433,255 bp
Band	6 A3.3|6 12.36 cM	End	29,461,882 bp
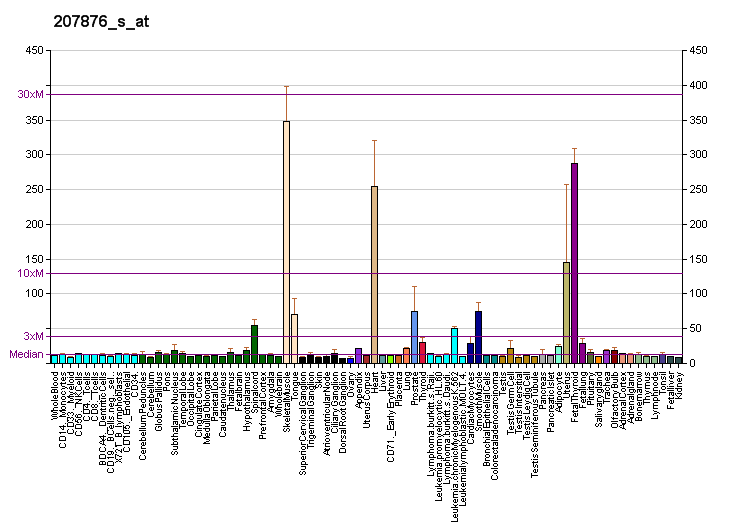
RNA expression pattern
Bgee	Human / Mouse (ortholog); Top expressed in: gastrocnemius muscle; muscle of thigh; tibialis anterior muscle; apex of heart; glutes; Skeletal muscle tissue of biceps brachii; Skeletal muscle tissue of rectus abdominis; vastus lateralis muscle; left ventricle; triceps brachii muscle / Top expressed in: muscle of thigh; temporal muscle; soleus muscle; gastrula; ankle; medial head of gastrocnemius muscle; skeletal muscle tissue; digastric muscle; tibialis anterior muscle; masseter muscle; More reference expression data
BioGPS	More reference expression data
Gene ontology
Molecular function	actin filament binding; actin binding; cytoskeletal protein binding; protein binding; ankyrin binding; identical protein binding
Cellular component	Z discdkac; sarcolemma; plasma membrane; membrane; focal adhesion; sarcoplasm; cytoplasm; costamere; cytoskeleton; cytosol
Biological process	cell junction assembly
Sources:Amigo / QuickGO
Orthologs
Databases	NCBI: entry; OMA: entry
Species	Human	Mouse
Entrez	2318	68794
Ensembl	ENSG00000128591	ENSMUSG00000068699
UniProt	Q14315	Q8VHX6
RefSeq (mRNA)	NM_001458; NM_001127487	NM_001081185; NM_001311074; NM_026839
RefSeq (protein)	NP_001120959; NP_001449	NP_001074654; NP_001298003
Location (UCSC)	Chr 7: 128.83 – 128.86 Mb	Chr 6: 29.43 – 29.46 Mb
PubMed search
- Wikidata
View/Edit Human	View/Edit Mouse

Filamin-C (FLN-C) also known as actin-binding-like protein (ABPL) or filamin-2 (FLN2) is a protein that in humans is encoded by the FLNC gene. Filamin-C is mainly expressed in cardiac and skeletal muscles, and functions at Z-discs and in subsarcolemmal regions.

== Structure ==
Filamin-C is a 290.8 kDa protein composed of 2,725 amino acids. Filamin-C, like the ubiquitously-expressed isoform Filamin-A, have an N-terminal filamentous actin-binding domain, followed by a lengthy C-terminal self-association domain containing a series of immunoglobulin-like domains, and a membrane glycoprotein-binding domain. Filamin-C interacts with γ-sarcoglycan and δ-sarcoglycan at the sarcolemma; myotilin and FATZ/calsarcin/myozenin at Z-lines, as well as LL5β. Filamin-C has also been shown to interact with INPPL1, KCND2, and MAP2K4.

== Function ==
The family of Filamin proteins crosslink actin filaments into orthogonal networks in cortical cytoplasm and participate in the anchoring of membrane proteins for the actin cytoskeleton. However, the precise function of the Filamin-C isoform is still under investigation. As Filamin-C is localized mainly to striated muscle, its functions are likely specific to the specialized sarcomeric cytoskeleton present in muscle. As Filamin-C is found at both subsarcolemmal regions and at Z-lines, one plausible function of Filamin-C would be to act as a mode of communication between the membrane and the sarcomere. In skeletal muscle, Filamin-C is found at sites of core formation in skeletal myopathies, and alterations in subcellular localization of Filamin-C have been exhibited in limb-girdle muscular dystrophy and Duchenne muscular dystrophy.

== Clinical significance ==
Mutations in Filamin C have been associated with human hypertrophic cardiomyopathy, dilated cardiomyopathy restrictive cardiomyopathy and a higher incidence of sudden cardiac death. Expression of mutant protein in rat cardiac cells demonstrated that mutant Filamin C forms aggregates, which may provide a mechanistic link to the observed cardiac dysfunction. Deficiency of this protein has been associated with muscle weakness.
