= Sarcoglycan =

Sarcoglycan beta/gamma/delta

Identifiers
- Symbol: Sarcoglycan_1
- Pfam: PF04790
- InterPro: IPR006875
- Membranome: 117
Available protein structures:
- PDB: IPR006875 PF04790 (ECOD; PDBsum)
- AlphaFold: IPR006875; PF04790

Sarcoglycan alpha/epsilon

Identifiers
- Symbol: Sarcoglycan_2
- Pfam: PF05510
- InterPro: IPR008908
Available protein structures:
- PDB: IPR008908 PF05510 (ECOD; PDBsum)
- AlphaFold: IPR008908; PF05510

The sarcoglycans are a family of transmembrane proteins (α, β, γ, δ or ε) involved in the protein complex responsible for connecting the muscle fibre cytoskeleton to the extracellular matrix, preventing damage to the muscle fibre sarcolemma through shearing forces.

The dystrophin glycoprotein complex (DGC) is a membrane-spanning complex that links the interior cytoskeleton to the extracellular matrix in muscle. The sarcoglycan complex is a subcomplex within the DGC and is composed of six muscle-specific, transmembrane proteins (alpha-, beta-, gamma-, delta-, epsilon-, and zeta-sarcoglycan). The sarcoglycans are asparagine-linked glycosylated proteins with single transmembrane domains.

The disorders caused by the mutations of the sarcoglycans are called sarcoglycanopathies. Mutations in the α, β, γ or δ genes (not ε) encoding these proteins can lead to the associated limb-girdle muscular dystrophy.

== Genes ==
- SGCA
- SGCB
- SGCD
- SGCE
- SGCG
- SGCZ
