= PHLDB2 =

Protein-coding gene in the species Homo sapiens

Identifiers
- Aliases: PHLDB2, LL5b, LL5beta, pleckstrin homology like domain family B member 2
- External IDs: OMIM: 610298; MGI: 2444981; GeneCards: PHLDB2

Gene location (Human)
Chr.	Chromosome 3 (human)
Band	3q13.2	Start	111,732,497 bp
Band	3q13.2	End	111,976,517 bp

Gene location (Mouse)
Chr.	Chromosome 16 (mouse)
Band	16|16 B5	Start	45,566,606 bp
Band	16|16 B5	End	45,773,961 bp
RNA expression pattern
Bgee	Human / Mouse (ortholog); Top expressed in: myocardium of left ventricle; tail of epididymis; parietal pleura; placenta; Achilles tendon; decidua; right ventricle; cardiac muscle tissue of right atrium; tibial arteries; visceral pleura / Top expressed in: genital tubercle; renal corpuscle; left lung lobe; urothelium; gastrula; medullary collecting duct; tunica media of zone of aorta; transitional epithelium of urinary bladder; calvaria; Gonadal ridge; More reference expression data
BioGPS	n/a
Gene ontology
Molecular function	protein binding; cadherin binding
Cellular component	plasma membrane; intermediate filament cytoskeleton; basal cortex; cell leading edge; membrane; focal adhesion; cytoplasm; cytosol
Biological process	negative regulation of wound healing, spreading of epidermal cells; regulation of epithelial to mesenchymal transition; regulation of microtubule cytoskeleton organization; positive regulation of basement membrane assembly involved in embryonic body morphogenesis; negative regulation of stress fiber assembly; regulation of gastrulation; microtubule cytoskeleton organization; negative regulation of focal adhesion assembly; establishment of protein localization
Sources:Amigo / QuickGO
Orthologs
Databases	NCBI: entry; OMA: entry
Species	Human	Mouse
Entrez	90102	208177
Ensembl	ENSG00000144824	ENSMUSG00000033149
UniProt	Q86SQ0	Q8K1N2
RefSeq (mRNA)	NM_145753; NM_001134437; NM_001134438; NM_001134439	NM_001252442; NM_153412; NM_001357078
RefSeq (protein)	NP_001127909; NP_001127910; NP_001127911; NP_665696	NP_001239371; NP_700461; NP_001344007
Location (UCSC)	Chr 3: 111.73 – 111.98 Mb	Chr 16: 45.57 – 45.77 Mb
PubMed search
- Wikidata
View/Edit Human	View/Edit Mouse

Pleckstrin homology-like domain family B member 2 is a protein that in humans is encoded by the PHLDB2 gene.

== Interactions ==
PHLDB2 has been shown to interact with FLNC.
