= Delta-sarcoglycan =

Mammalian protein found in Homo sapiens

SGCD

Identifiers
- Aliases: SGCD, 35DAG, CMD1L, DAGD, SG-delta, SGCDP, SGD, sarcoglycan delta, LGMDR6
- External IDs: OMIM: 601411; MGI: 1346525; GeneCards: SGCD

Gene location (Human)
Chr.	Chromosome 5 (human)
Band	5q33.2-q33.3	Start	155,870,344 bp
Band	5q33.2-q33.3	End	156,767,788 bp
RNA expression pattern
Bgee	Human / Mouse (ortholog); Top expressed in: myocardium of left ventricle; Skeletal muscle tissue of rectus abdominis; right ventricle; Skeletal muscle tissue of biceps brachii; vastus lateralis muscle; cardiac muscle tissue of right atrium; deltoid muscle; saphenous vein; glutes; tibialis anterior muscle / n/a; More reference expression data
BioGPS	n/a
Gene ontology
Molecular function	protein binding
Cellular component	cytoplasm; integral component of membrane; dystroglycan complex; plasma membrane; sarcolemma; dystrophin-associated glycoprotein complex; cytoskeleton; membrane; sarcoglycan complex; sarcoplasmic reticulum
Biological process	muscle organ development; membrane organization; heart contraction; muscle cell development; cardiac muscle tissue development; heart process; cell death; calcium-mediated signaling; calcium ion homeostasis; cardiac muscle contraction; coronary vasculature morphogenesis; cardiac muscle cell contraction
Sources:Amigo / QuickGO
Orthologs
Databases	NCBI: entry; OMA: entry
Species	Human	Mouse
Entrez	6444	24052
Ensembl	ENSG00000170624	n/a
UniProt	Q92629	P82347
RefSeq (mRNA)	NM_000337; NM_001128209; NM_172244	NM_011891
RefSeq (protein)	NP_000328; NP_001121681; NP_758447	NP_036021
Location (UCSC)	Chr 5: 155.87 – 156.77 Mb	n/a
PubMed search
- Wikidata
View/Edit Human	View/Edit Mouse

Delta-sarcoglycan is a protein that in humans is encoded by the SGCD gene.

== Function ==
The protein encoded by this gene is one of the four known components of the sarcoglycan complex, which is a subcomplex of the dystrophin-glycoprotein complex (DGC). DGC forms a link between the F-actin cytoskeleton and the extracellular matrix. This protein is expressed most abundantly in skeletal and cardiac muscle. The mutations in this gene have been associated with autosomal recessive limb-girdle muscular dystrophy and dilated cardiomyopathy. Alternatively spliced transcript variants encoding distinct isoforms have been observed.

In melanocytic cells SGCD gene expression may be regulated by MITF.

== Interactions ==
SGCD has been shown to interact with FLNC.
