= ANO5 =

Protein-coding gene in the species Homo sapiens

Identifiers
- Aliases: ANO5, GDD1, LGMD2L, TMEM16E, anoctamin 5, LGMDR12
- External IDs: OMIM: 608662; MGI: 3576659; GeneCards: ANO5

Gene location (Human)
Chr.	Chromosome 11 (human)
Band	11p14.3	Start	21,782,659 bp
Band	11p14.3	End	22,283,567 bp

Gene location (Mouse)
Chr.	Chromosome 7 (mouse)
Band	7|7 B4	Start	51,511,029 bp
Band	7|7 B4	End	51,598,709 bp
RNA expression pattern
Bgee	Human / Mouse (ortholog); Top expressed in: cardiac muscle tissue of right atrium; myocardium of left ventricle; vastus lateralis muscle; Skeletal muscle tissue of rectus abdominis; deltoid muscle; biceps brachii; Skeletal muscle tissue of biceps brachii; tibialis anterior muscle; Brodmann area 23; middle temporal gyrus / Top expressed in: quadriceps femoris muscle; skeletal muscle tissue; muscle of thigh; spermatocyte; spermatid; esophagus; zone of skin; perichondrium; myotome; embryo; More reference expression data
BioGPS	n/a
Gene ontology
Molecular function	protein dimerization activity; intracellular calcium activated chloride channel activity
Cellular component	integral component of membrane; vesicle; plasma membrane; intracellular anatomical structure; endoplasmic reticulum membrane; endoplasmic reticulum; membrane
Biological process	ion transmembrane transport; chloride transport
Sources:Amigo / QuickGO
Orthologs
Databases	NCBI: entry; OMA: entry
Species	Human	Mouse
Entrez	203859	233246
Ensembl	ENSG00000171714	ENSMUSG00000055489
UniProt	Q75V66	Q75UR0
RefSeq (mRNA)	NM_001142649; NM_213599	NM_001271879; NM_177694
RefSeq (protein)	NP_001136121; NP_998764	NP_001258808; NP_808362
Location (UCSC)	Chr 11: 21.78 – 22.28 Mb	Chr 7: 51.51 – 51.6 Mb
PubMed search
- Wikidata
View/Edit Human	View/Edit Mouse

Anoctamin 5 (ANO5) is a protein that in humans is encoded by the ANO5 gene.

== Function ==
The ANO5 gene provides instructions for making a protein called anoctamin-5. While the specific function of this protein is not well understood, it belongs to a family of proteins, called anoctamins, that act as chloride channels. Chloride channels, which transport negatively charged chlorine atoms (chloride ions) in and out of cells, play a key role in a cell's ability to generate and transmit electrical signals. Most anoctamin proteins function as chloride channels that are turned on (activated) in the presence of positively charged calcium atoms (calcium ions); these channels are known as calcium-activated chloride channels. The mechanism for this calcium activation is unclear. Anoctamin proteins are also involved in maintaining the membrane that surrounds cells and repairing the membrane if damaged.

The anoctamin-5 protein is most abundant in muscles used for movement (skeletal muscles). For the body to move normally, skeletal muscles must tense (contract) and relax in a coordinated way. The regulation of chloride flow within muscle cells plays a role in controlling muscle contraction and relaxation.

The anoctamin-5 protein is also found in other cells including heart (cardiac) muscle cells and bone cells. The anoctamin-5 protein may be important for the development of muscle and bone before birth.

== Clinical significance ==
Mutations in the ANO5 gene are known to cause the following conditions:

- Gnathodiaphyseal dysplasia (GDD), a rare skeletal syndrome.
- Limb Girdle Muscular Dystrophy 2L (LGMD2L, Autosomal Recessive 12) and Miyoshi Muscular Dystrophy 3 (MMD3). These forms of muscular dystrophy are inherited in an autosomal recessive pattern. To be affected, a person must have mutations on both copies of the gene. Males and females are equally likely to be affected.

== Typical Symptoms ==
GDD causes bone fragility, sclerosis of tubular bones, and cemento-osseous lesions of the jawbone. Patients also experience frequent bone fractures.

Clinically, LGMD2L and MMD3 were considered different diseases before ANO5 was identified as the responsible gene; LGMD was used to describe initial weakness in proximal muscles (hip and shoulder girdles) while MMD described initial weakness in the distal muscles of the lower limbs.

== Other names for this gene ==
- ANO5_HUMAN
- anoctamin-5
- GDD1
- gnathodiaphyseal dysplasia 1 protein
- integral membrane protein GDD1
- LGMD2L
- TMEM16E
- transmembrane protein 16E

== Chromosal location ==
- Cytogenetic location: 11p14.3, which is the short (p) arm of chromosome 11 at position 14.3
- Molecular location: base pairs 22,192,485 to 22,283,367 on chromosome 11 (Homo sapiens Annotation Release 109, GRCh38.p12) (NCBI)

Credit: Genome Decoration Page/NCBI
