= Trafficking protein particle complex 11 =

Protein-coding gene in the species Homo sapiens

TRAPPC11

Identifiers
- Aliases: TRAPPC11, C4orf41, FOIGR, GRY, LGMD2S, trafficking protein particle complex 11, LGMDR18, trafficking protein particle complex subunit 11
- External IDs: OMIM: 614138; MGI: 2444585; GeneCards: TRAPPC11

Gene location (Human)
Chr.	Chromosome 4 (human)
Band	4q35.1	Start	183,659,267 bp
Band	4q35.1	End	183,713,594 bp

Gene location (Mouse)
Chr.	Chromosome 8 (mouse)
Band	8|8 B1.1	Start	47,943,150 bp
Band	8|8 B1.1	End	47,986,505 bp
RNA expression pattern
Bgee	Human / Mouse (ortholog); Top expressed in: Achilles tendon; gonad; monocyte; ventricular zone; right adrenal cortex; cerebellar hemisphere; right ovary; left ovary; right hemisphere of cerebellum; tonsil / Top expressed in: hand; otic vesicle; otolith organ; utricle; arcuate nucleus; superior cervical ganglion; parotid gland; ventromedial nucleus; median eminence; Gonadal ridge; More reference expression data
BioGPS	n/a
Gene ontology
Molecular function	protein binding
Cellular component	cytosol; Golgi apparatus; TRAPP complex
Biological process	vesicle-mediated transport; endoplasmic reticulum to Golgi vesicle-mediated transport; Golgi organization; protein complex oligomerization; regulation of protein complex stability
Sources:Amigo / QuickGO
Orthologs
Databases	NCBI: entry; OMA: entry
Species	Human	Mouse
Entrez	60684	320714
Ensembl	ENSG00000168538	ENSMUSG00000038102
UniProt	Q7Z392	B2RXC1
RefSeq (mRNA)	NM_021942; NM_199053	NM_177240
RefSeq (protein)	NP_068761; NP_951008	NP_796214
Location (UCSC)	Chr 4: 183.66 – 183.71 Mb	Chr 8: 47.94 – 47.99 Mb
PubMed search
- Wikidata
View/Edit Human	View/Edit Mouse

Trafficking protein particle complex 11 is a protein that in humans is encoded by the TRAPPC11 gene.

== Function ==
The protein encoded by this gene is a subunit of the TRAPP (transport protein particle) tethering complex, which functions in intracellular vesicle trafficking. This subunit is involved in early stage endoplasmic reticulum-to-Golgi vesicle transport. Alternative splicing of this gene results in multiple transcript variants. [provided by RefSeq, Jan 2013].
