= SGCZ =

Protein-coding gene in the species Homo sapiens

Identifiers
- Aliases: SGCZ, ZSG1, sarcoglycan zeta
- External IDs: OMIM: 608113; MGI: 2388820; GeneCards: SGCZ

Gene location (Human)
Chr.	Chromosome 8 (human)
Band	8p22	Start	14,084,845 bp
Band	8p22	End	15,238,431 bp

Gene location (Mouse)
Chr.	Chromosome 8 (mouse)
Band	8|8 A4	Start	37,989,452 bp
Band	8|8 A4	End	39,128,662 bp
RNA expression pattern
Bgee	Human / Mouse (ortholog); Top expressed in: testicle; oocyte; islet of Langerhans; prefrontal cortex; stromal cell of endometrium; ganglionic eminence; cerebellar cortex; cerebellar hemisphere; nucleus accumbens; left ovary / Top expressed in: striatum of neuraxis; neural tube; Cortex of frontal lobe; superior frontal gyrus; mesencephalon; primary visual cortex; rhombencephalon; hypothalamus; dentate gyrus of hippocampal formation granule cell; hippocampus proper; More reference expression data
BioGPS	n/a
Orthologs
Databases	NCBI: entry; OMA: entry
Species	Human	Mouse
Entrez	137868	244431
Ensembl	ENSG00000185053	ENSMUSG00000039539
UniProt	Q96LD1	Q8BX51
RefSeq (mRNA)	NM_139167; NM_001322879; NM_001322880; NM_001322881	NM_145841
RefSeq (protein)	NP_001309808; NP_001309809; NP_001309810; NP_631906	NP_665840
Location (UCSC)	Chr 8: 14.08 – 15.24 Mb	Chr 8: 37.99 – 39.13 Mb
PubMed search
- Wikidata
View/Edit Human	View/Edit Mouse

Sarcoglycan zeta also known as SGCZ is a protein which in humans is encoded by the SGCZ gene.

== Function ==
The zeta-sarcoglycan gene measures over 465 kb and localizes to 8p22. This protein is part of the sarcoglycan complex, a group of 6 proteins. The sarcoglycans are all N-glycosylated transmembrane proteins with a short intra-cellular domain, a single transmembrane region and a large extra-cellular domain containing a carboxyl-terminal cluster with several conserved cysteine residues. The sarcoglycan complex is part of the dystrophin-associated glycoprotein complex (DGC), which bridges the inner cytoskeleton and the extracellular matrix.

== Clinical significance ==
Zeta-sarcoglycan is reduced in mouse models of muscular dystrophy and SGCZ is found as a component of the vascular smooth muscle sarcoglycan complex. Hence SGCZ may be important in the pathogenesis of muscular dystrophy.
