= SGCB =

Protein-coding gene in the species Homo sapiens

Identifiers
- Aliases: SGCB, A3b, LGMD2E, SGC, sarcoglycan beta, LGMDR4
- External IDs: OMIM: 600900; MGI: 1346523; GeneCards: SGCB

Gene location (Human)
Chr.	Chromosome 4 (human)
Band	4q12	Start	52,020,706 bp
Band	4q12	End	52,038,299 bp

Gene location (Mouse)
Chr.	Chromosome 5 (mouse)
Band	5|5 C3.3	Start	73,790,092 bp
Band	5|5 C3.3	End	73,805,133 bp
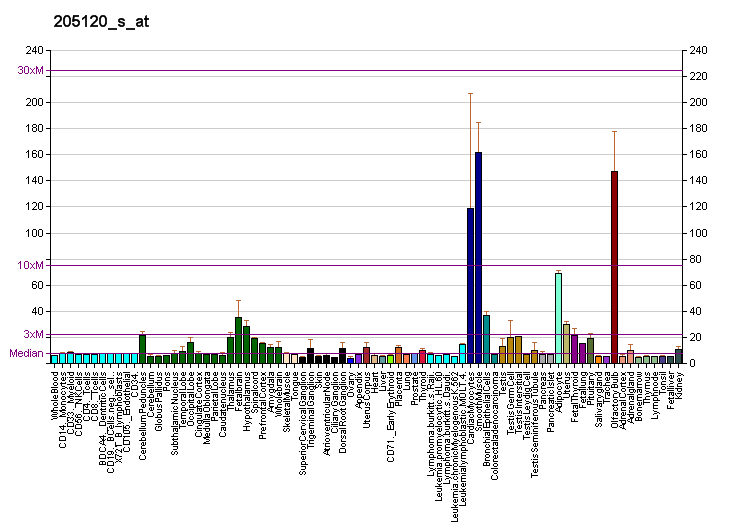

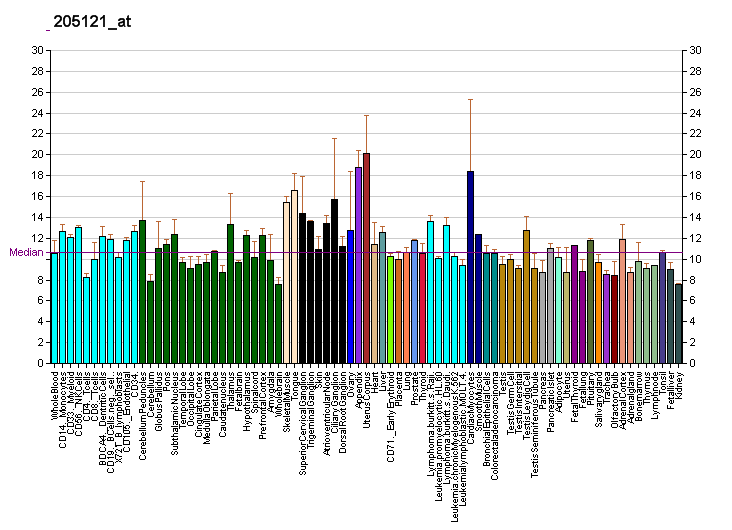
RNA expression pattern
Bgee	Human / Mouse (ortholog); Top expressed in: tendon of biceps brachii; Skeletal muscle tissue of rectus abdominis; Skeletal muscle tissue of biceps brachii; right ventricle; ganglionic eminence; internal globus pallidus; trigeminal ganglion; ventricular zone; sperm; tibia / Top expressed in: triceps brachii muscle; temporal muscle; sternocleidomastoid muscle; right ventricle; digastric muscle; ankle; muscle of thigh; myocardium of ventricle; intercostal muscle; quadriceps femoris muscle; More reference expression data
BioGPS	More reference expression data
Orthologs
Databases	NCBI: entry; OMA: entry
Species	Human	Mouse
Entrez	6443	24051
Ensembl	ENSG00000163069	ENSMUSG00000029156
UniProt	Q16585; Q5U0N0	P82349
RefSeq (mRNA)	NM_000232	NM_011890
RefSeq (protein)	NP_000223; NP_000223.1	NP_036020
Location (UCSC)	Chr 4: 52.02 – 52.04 Mb	Chr 5: 73.79 – 73.81 Mb
PubMed search
- Wikidata
View/Edit Human	View/Edit Mouse

Beta-sarcoglycan is a protein that in humans is encoded by the SGCB gene.

The dystrophin-glycoprotein complex (DGC) is a multisubunit protein complex that spans the sarcolemma and provides structural linkage between the subsarcolemmal cytoskeleton and the extracellular matrix of muscle cells. There are 3 main subcomplexes of the DGC: the cytoplasmic proteins dystrophin (DMD; MIM 300377) and syntrophin (SNTA1; MIM 601017), the alpha- and beta-dystroglycans (see MIM 128239), and the sarcoglycans (see, e.g., SGCA; MIM 600119) (Crosbie et al., 2000).[supplied by OMIM].

== Clinical significance ==
Mutations in the SGCB gene are known to cause Limb-girdle muscular dystrophy, autosomal recessive 4 (LGMDR4). This condition causes pelvic and shoulder muscle wasting, usually from childhood.
