= Mannosyl-oligosaccharide 1,2-alpha-mannosidase =

Mannosyl-oligosaccharide 1,2-α-mannosidase

Identifiers
- EC no.: 3.2.1.113
- CAS no.: 9068-25-1

Databases
- IntEnz: IntEnz view
- BRENDA: BRENDA entry
- ExPASy: NiceZyme view
- KEGG: KEGG entry
- MetaCyc: metabolic pathway
- PRIAM: profile
- PDB structures: RCSB PDB PDBe PDBsum
Search
- PMC: articles
- PubMed: articles
- NCBI: proteins

Mannosyl-oligosaccharide 1,2-α-mannosidase (EC 3.2.1.113, mannosidase 1A, mannosidase 1B, 1,2-α-mannosidase, exo-α-1,2-mannanase, mannose-9 processing α-mannosidase, glycoprotein processing mannosidase I, mannosidase I, Man_{9}-mannosidase, ManI, 1,2-α-mannosyl-oligosaccharide α-D-mannohydrolase) is an enzyme with systematic name 2-α-mannosyl-oligosaccharide α-D-mannohydrolase. It catalyses the hydrolysis of the terminal (1→2)-linked α-D-mannose residues in the oligo-mannose oligosaccharide Man_{9}(GlcNAc)_{2}.

This enzyme is involved in the synthesis of glycoproteins.

Kifunensine is a potent inhibitor of mannosidase I.
