= DNAJB6 =

Protein-coding gene in the species Homo sapiens

Identifiers
- Aliases: DNAJB6, Dnajb6, Mrj, mDj4, DJ4, DnaJ, HHDJ1, HSJ-2, HSJ2, LGMD1D, LGMD1E, MSJ-1, DnaJ heat shock protein family (Hsp40) member B6, LGMDD1
- External IDs: OMIM: 611332; MGI: 1344381; GeneCards: DNAJB6

Gene location (Human)
Chr.	Chromosome 7 (human)
Band	7q36.3	Start	157,335,381 bp
Band	7q36.3	End	157,417,439 bp

Gene location (Mouse)
Chr.	Chromosome 5 (mouse)
Band	5|5 B1	Start	29,940,686 bp
Band	5|5 B1	End	30,023,132 bp
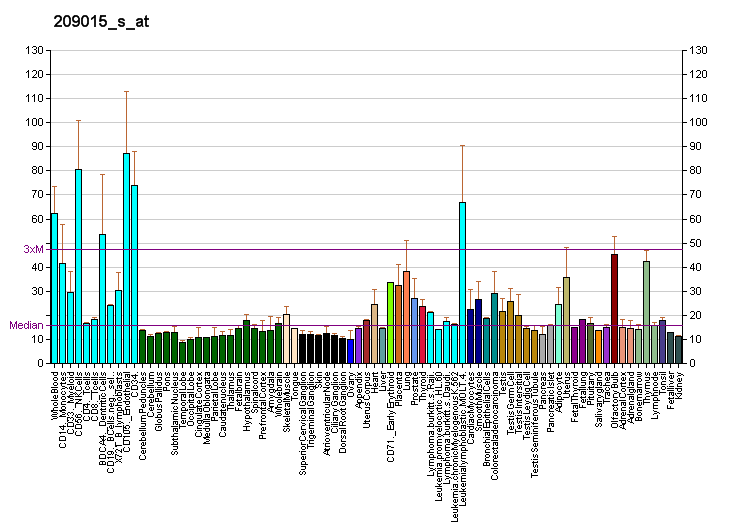

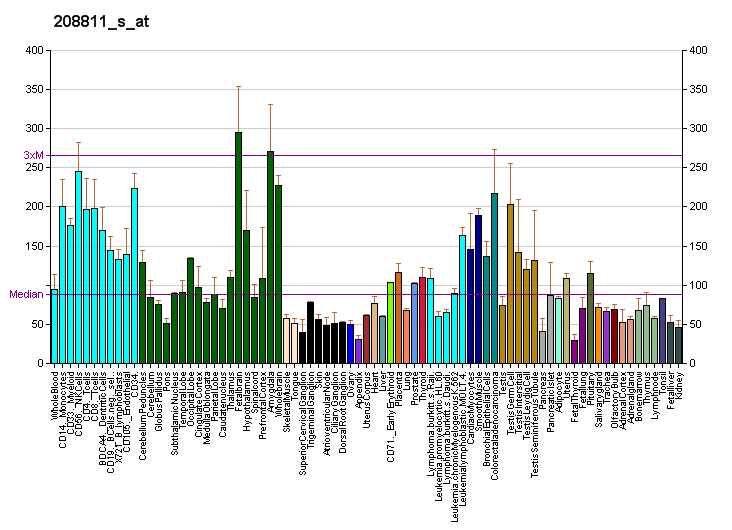
RNA expression pattern
Bgee	Human / Mouse (ortholog); Top expressed in: gonad; ganglionic eminence; gastrocnemius muscle; skin of abdomen; muscle of thigh; skin of leg; C1 segment; popliteal artery; tibial arteries; ventricular zone / Top expressed in: zygote; spermatocyte; spermatid; morula; neural layer of retina; primary visual cortex; superior frontal gyrus; dentate gyrus of hippocampal formation granule cell; seminiferous tubule; muscle of thigh; More reference expression data
BioGPS	More reference expression data
Gene ontology
Molecular function	chaperone binding; heat shock protein binding; unfolded protein binding; protein binding; ATPase activator activity; identical protein binding; DNA binding
Cellular component	cytoplasm; cytosol; membrane; nucleoplasm; Z discdkac; perinuclear region of cytoplasm; nucleus
Biological process	intermediate filament organization; negative regulation of cysteine-type endopeptidase activity involved in apoptotic process; negative regulation of inclusion body assembly; regulation of protein localization; protein folding; regulation of cellular response to heat; positive regulation of ATP-dependent activity; actin cytoskeleton organization; extracellular matrix organization; protein localization to nucleus; negative regulation of transcription, DNA-templated; chorio-allantoic fusion; syncytiotrophoblast cell differentiation involved in labyrinthine layer development; chorion development
Sources:Amigo / QuickGO
Orthologs
Databases	NCBI: entry; OMA: entry
Species	Human	Mouse
Entrez	10049	23950
Ensembl	ENSG00000105993	ENSMUSG00000029131
UniProt	O75190	O54946
RefSeq (mRNA)	NM_005494; NM_058246; NM_001363676	NM_001037940; NM_001037941; NM_001127367; NM_011847; NM_001359198 NM_001378835
RefSeq (protein)	NP_005485; NP_490647; NP_001350605	NP_001033029; NP_001033030; NP_001120839; NP_035977; NP_001346127 NP_001365764
Location (UCSC)	Chr 7: 157.34 – 157.42 Mb	Chr 5: 29.94 – 30.02 Mb
PubMed search
- Wikidata
View/Edit Human	View/Edit Mouse

DnaJ homolog subfamily B member 6 is a protein that in humans is encoded by the DNAJB6 gene.

== Function ==
This gene encodes a member of the DNAJ protein family. DNAJ family members are characterized by a highly conserved amino acid stretch called the 'J-domain' and function as one of the two major classes of molecular chaperones involved in a wide range of cellular events, such as protein folding and oligomeric protein complex assembly. This family member may also play a role in polyglutamine aggregation in specific neurons. Alternative splicing of this gene results in multiple transcript variants; however, not all variants have been fully described.

== Interactions ==
DNAJB6 has been shown to interact with keratin 18. It has been also shown that the aggregation of Aβ42 (a process involved in e.g. Alzheimer's disease) is retarded by DNAJB6 in a concentration-dependent manner, extending to very low sub-stoichiometric molar ratios of chaperone to peptide. Dominant mutations in DNAJB6 have also been found to cause a late-onset muscle disease termed limb-girdle muscular dystrophy type D1 (LGMDD1), which is characterized by protein aggregation and vacuolar myopathology.
