= Sarcoglycanopathy =

The sarcoglycanopathies are a collection of diseases resulting from mutations in any of the five sarcoglycan genes: α, β, γ, δ or ε. The five sarcoglycanopathies are: α-sarcoglycanopathy, LGMD2D; β-sarcoglycanopathy, LGMD2E; γ-sarcoglycanopathy, LGMD2C; δ-sarcoglycanopathy, LGMD2F and ε-sarcoglycanopathy, myoclonic dystonia. The four different sarcoglycan genes encode proteins that form a tetrameric complex at the muscle cell plasma membrane. This complex stabilizes the association of dystrophin with the dystroglycans and contributes to the stability of the plasma membrane cytoskeleton. The four sarcoglycan genes are related to each other structurally and functionally, but each has a distinct chromosome location.

In outbred populations, the relative frequency of mutations in the four genes is alpha >> beta >> gamma >> delta in an 8:4:2:1 ratio. No common mutations have been identified in outbred populations except the R77C mutation, which accounts for up to one-third of the mutated SGCA alleles. Founder mutations have been observed in certain populations. A 1997 Italian clinical study demonstrated variations in muscular dystrophy progression dependent on the sarcoglycan gene affected.
