= Pyridine nucleotide-disulphide oxidoreductase domain 1 =

Protein-coding gene in the species Homo sapiens

PYROXD1

Identifiers
- Aliases: PYROXD1, pyridine nucleotide-disulphide oxidoreductase domain 1, MFM8
- External IDs: OMIM: 617220; MGI: 2676395; GeneCards: PYROXD1
Enzyme activity
EC #	BRENDA	ExPASy	KEGG	MetaCyc
1.6.99.1	↗	↗	↗	↗

Gene location (Human)
Chr.	Chromosome 12 (human)
Band	12p12.1	Start	21,437,615 bp
Band	12p12.1	End	21,471,250 bp

Gene location (Mouse)
Chr.	Chromosome 6 (mouse)
Band	6|6 G2	Start	142,291,380 bp
Band	6|6 G2	End	142,308,983 bp
RNA expression pattern
Bgee	Human / Mouse (ortholog); Top expressed in: buccal mucosa cell; mucosa of sigmoid colon; jejunal mucosa; kidney tubule; Epithelium of choroid plexus; endothelial cell; Achilles tendon; biceps brachii; bronchial epithelial cell; body of pancreas / Top expressed in: tail of embryo; genital tubercle; proximal tubule; spermatid; right kidney; duodenum; jejunum; muscle of thigh; Paneth cell; spermatocyte; More reference expression data
BioGPS	n/a
Gene ontology
Molecular function	protein binding; oxidoreductase activity
Cellular component	nucleus; cytoplasm; sarcomere
Biological process	cellular response to oxidative stress
Sources:Amigo / QuickGO
Orthologs
Databases	NCBI: entry; OMA: entry
Species	Human	Mouse
Entrez	79912	232491
Ensembl	ENSG00000121350	ENSMUSG00000041671
UniProt	Q8WU10	Q3TMV7
RefSeq (mRNA)	NM_024854; NM_001350912; NM_001350913	NM_183165
RefSeq (protein)	NP_079130; NP_001337841; NP_001337842	NP_898988
Location (UCSC)	Chr 12: 21.44 – 21.47 Mb	Chr 6: 142.29 – 142.31 Mb
PubMed search
- Wikidata
View/Edit Human	View/Edit Mouse

Pyridine nucleotide-disulphide oxidoreductase domain 1 is a protein that in humans is encoded by the PYROXD1 gene.

== Function ==
This gene encodes a nuclear-cytoplasmic pyridine nucleotide-disulphide reductase (PNDR). PNDRs are flavoproteins that catalyze the pyridine nucleotide-dependent reduction of thiol residues in other proteins. The encoded protein belongs to the class I pyridine nucleotide-disulphide oxidoreductase family but lacks the C-terminal dimerization domain found in other family members and instead has a C-terminal nitrile reductase domain. It localizes to the nucleus and to striated sarcomeric compartments. Naturally occurring mutations in this gene cause early-onset myopathy with internalized nuclei and myofibrillar disorganization. A pseudogene of this gene has been defined on chromosome 11. [provided by RefSeq, Apr 2017].
