= LIMS2 =

Protein-coding gene in the species Homo sapiens

Identifiers
- Aliases: LIMS2, PINCH-2, PINCH2, LGMD2W, LIM zinc finger domain containing 2, MDRCMTT
- External IDs: OMIM: 607908; MGI: 2385067; GeneCards: LIMS2
Available structures
PDB	Ortholog search: PDBe RCSB
PDB	List of PDB id codes 3IXE

Gene location (Human)
Chr.	Chromosome 2 (human)
Band	2q14.3	Start	127,638,381 bp
Band	2q14.3	End	127,681,786 bp

Gene location (Mouse)
Chr.	Chromosome 18 (mouse)
Band	18|18 B1	Start	32,055,343 bp
Band	18|18 B1	End	32,091,672 bp
RNA expression pattern
Bgee	Human / Mouse (ortholog); Top expressed in: apex of heart; muscle layer of sigmoid colon; body of uterus; right coronary artery; popliteal artery; tibial arteries; ascending aorta; Descending thoracic aorta; left coronary artery; right lung / Top expressed in: tunica media of zone of aorta; interventricular septum; ascending aorta; right lung lobe; sciatic nerve; left lobe of liver; umbilical cord; spermatocyte; aortic valve; myocardium of ventricle; More reference expression data
BioGPS	n/a
Gene ontology
Molecular function	protein binding; metal ion binding
Cellular component	cytosol; cell junction; plasma membrane; membrane; nucleus; focal adhesion; cytoplasm; cell-cell junction
Biological process	positive regulation of integrin-mediated signaling pathway; negative regulation of neural precursor cell proliferation; cell-cell junction organization; negative regulation of apoptotic process; negative regulation of hepatocyte proliferation; cell junction assembly; negative regulation of epithelial cell proliferation; cell-cell adhesion; positive regulation of substrate adhesion-dependent cell spreading
Sources:Amigo / QuickGO
Orthologs
Databases	NCBI: entry; OMA: entry
Species	Human	Mouse
Entrez	55679	225341
Ensembl	ENSG00000072163	ENSMUSG00000024395
UniProt	Q7Z4I7	Q91XD2
RefSeq (mRNA)	NM_001136037; NM_001161403; NM_001161404; NM_001256542; NM_017980	NM_144862; NM_001365015; NM_001379137; NM_001379138
RefSeq (protein)	NP_001129509; NP_001154875; NP_001154876; NP_001243471; NP_060450	NP_659111; NP_001351944; NP_001366066; NP_001366067
Location (UCSC)	Chr 2: 127.64 – 127.68 Mb	Chr 18: 32.06 – 32.09 Mb
PubMed search
- Wikidata
View/Edit Human	View/Edit Mouse

LIM zinc finger domain containing 2 is a protein that in humans is encoded by the LIMS2 gene.

== Function ==
This gene encodes a member of a small family of focal adhesion proteins which interacts with ILK (integrin-linked kinase), a protein which effects protein-protein interactions with the extraceullar matrix. The encoded protein has five LIM domains, each domain forming two zinc fingers, which permit interactions which regulate cell shape and migration. A pseudogene of this gene is located on chromosome 4. Multiple transcript variants encoding different isoforms have been found for this gene. [provided by RefSeq, Nov 2011].
