= Keratin 18 =

Keratin protein in humans

KRT18

Identifiers
- Aliases: KRT18, CK-18, CYK18, K18, keratin 18
- External IDs: OMIM: 148070; MGI: 96692; GeneCards: KRT18

Gene location (Human)
Chr.	Chromosome 12 (human)
Band	12q13.13	Start	52,948,871 bp
Band	12q13.13	End	52,952,906 bp

Gene location (Mouse)
Chr.	Chromosome 15 (mouse)
Band	15 F2|15 57.22 cM	Start	101,936,615 bp
Band	15 F2|15 57.22 cM	End	101,940,462 bp
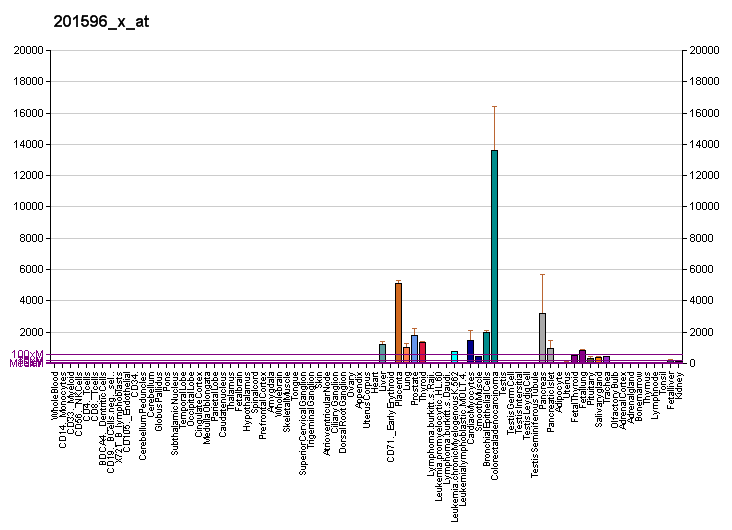
RNA expression pattern
Bgee	Human / Mouse (ortholog); Top expressed in: mucosa of sigmoid colon; mucosa of ileum; mucosa of transverse colon; rectum; olfactory zone of nasal mucosa; body of pancreas; parotid gland; placenta; islet of Langerhans; nasal epithelium / Top expressed in: transitional epithelium of urinary bladder; epithelium of stomach; lacrimal gland; mucous cell of stomach; submandibular gland; lobe of prostate; seminal vesicula; crypt of lieberkuhn of small intestine; pyloric antrum; parotid gland; More reference expression data
BioGPS	More reference expression data
Gene ontology
Molecular function	scaffold protein binding; structural molecule activity; protein binding; cadherin binding involved in cell-cell adhesion; RNA binding
Cellular component	cytoplasm; centriolar satellite; keratin filament; microtubule organizing center; nucleolus; perinuclear region of cytoplasm; extracellular exosome; intermediate filament; cell periphery; nucleus; cytosol
Biological process	Golgi to plasma membrane CFTR protein transport; extrinsic apoptotic signaling pathway; anatomical structure morphogenesis; negative regulation of apoptotic process; tumor necrosis factor-mediated signaling pathway; intermediate filament cytoskeleton organization; cell cycle; viral process; hepatocyte apoptotic process; cell-cell adhesion; keratinization; cornification
Sources:Amigo / QuickGO
Orthologs
Databases	NCBI: entry; OMA: entry
Species	Human	Mouse
Entrez	3875	16668
Ensembl	ENSG00000111057	ENSMUSG00000023043
UniProt	P05783	P05784
RefSeq (mRNA)	NM_199187; NM_000224	NM_010664
RefSeq (protein)	NP_000215; NP_954657	NP_034794
Location (UCSC)	Chr 12: 52.95 – 52.95 Mb	Chr 15: 101.94 – 101.94 Mb
PubMed search
- Wikidata
View/Edit Human	View/Edit Mouse

Keratin 18 is a type I cytokeratin. It is, together with its filament partner keratin 8, perhaps the most commonly found products of the intermediate filament gene family. They are expressed in single layer epithelial tissues of the body. Mutations in this gene have been linked to cryptogenic cirrhosis. Two transcript variants encoding the same protein have been found for this gene.

Keratin 18 is often used together with keratin 8 and keratin 19 to differentiate cells of epithelial origin from hematopoietic cells in tests that enumerate circulating tumor cells in blood.

== Interactions ==
Keratin 18 has been shown to interact with Collagen, type XVII, alpha 1, DNAJB6, Pinin and TRADD.
