= SGCA =

Protein-coding gene in the species Homo sapiens

Identifiers
- Aliases: SGCA, 50-DAG, A2, ADL, DAG2, DMDA2, LGMD2D, SCARMD1, adhalin, 50DAG, sarcoglycan alpha, LGMDR3
- External IDs: OMIM: 600119; MGI: 894698; GeneCards: SGCA

Gene location (Human)
Chr.	Chromosome 17 (human)
Band	17q21.33	Start	50,164,214 bp
Band	17q21.33	End	50,175,928 bp

Gene location (Mouse)
Chr.	Chromosome 11 (mouse)
Band	11|11 D	Start	94,853,617 bp
Band	11|11 D	End	94,867,153 bp
RNA expression pattern
Bgee	Human / Mouse (ortholog); Top expressed in: muscle of thigh; gastrocnemius muscle; apex of heart; right coronary artery; ascending aorta; popliteal artery; tibial arteries; Descending thoracic aorta; right auricle of heart; gastric mucosa / Top expressed in: muscle of thigh; ankle; triceps brachii muscle; sternocleidomastoid muscle; extensor digitorum longus muscle; temporal muscle; vastus lateralis muscle; interventricular septum; digastric muscle; triceps surae; More reference expression data
BioGPS	n/a
Gene ontology
Molecular function	calcium ion binding; protein binding
Cellular component	cytoplasm; integral component of membrane; membrane raft; dystroglycan complex; sarcolemma; plasma membrane; dystrophin-associated glycoprotein complex; cytoskeleton; membrane; cell-cell junction; sarcoglycan complex
Biological process	muscle organ development; muscle contraction; membrane organization; response to denervation involved in regulation of muscle adaptation; skeletal muscle tissue regeneration
Sources:Amigo / QuickGO
Orthologs
Databases	NCBI: entry; OMA: entry
Species	Human	Mouse
Entrez	6442	20391
Ensembl	ENSG00000108823	ENSMUSG00000001508
UniProt	Q16586	P82350
RefSeq (mRNA)	NM_000023; NM_001135697	NM_009161
RefSeq (protein)	NP_000014; NP_001129169	NP_033187
Location (UCSC)	Chr 17: 50.16 – 50.18 Mb	Chr 11: 94.85 – 94.87 Mb
PubMed search
- Wikidata
View/Edit Human	View/Edit Mouse

Alpha-sarcoglycan is a protein that in humans is encoded by the SGCA gene.

== Function ==
The dystrophin-glycoprotein complex (DGC) comprises a group of proteins that are critical to the stability of muscle fiber membranes and to the linking of the actin cytoskeleton to the extracellular matrix. Components of the DGC include dystrophin (MIM 300377), which is deficient in Duchenne muscular dystrophy (DMD; MIM 310200); syntrophins (e.g., MIM 600026); dystroglycans (MIM 128239); and sarcoglycans, such as adhalin, a 50-kD transmembrane protein (Roberds et al., 1993).[supplied by OMIM].

== Clinical significance ==
Mutations in the SGCA gene are known to cause Limb-girdle muscular dystrophy, autosomal recessive 3 (LGMDR3). This condition causes progressive muscle wasting from early childhood leading to loss of independent mobility as a teenager.

== Interactions ==
SGCA has been shown to interact with Biglycan.
