= ALG14 =

Protein-coding gene in humans

Identifiers
- Aliases: ALG14, CMS15, UDP-N-acetylglucosaminyltransferase subunit, ALG14 UDP-N-acetylglucosaminyltransferase subunit, IDDEBF, MEPCA
- External IDs: OMIM: 612866; MGI: 1914039; GeneCards: ALG14

Gene location (Human)
Chr.	Chromosome 1 (human)
Band	1p21.3	Start	94,974,405 bp
Band	1p21.3	End	95,072,951 bp

Gene location (Mouse)
Chr.	Chromosome 3 (mouse)
Band	3|3 G1	Start	121,085,422 bp
Band	3|3 G1	End	121,156,743 bp
RNA expression pattern
Bgee	Human / Mouse (ortholog); Top expressed in: corpus epididymis; jejunal mucosa; mucosa of colon; mucosa of sigmoid colon; right adrenal gland; oral cavity; left adrenal gland; caput epididymis; Achilles tendon; palpebral conjunctiva / Top expressed in: sciatic nerve; retinal pigment epithelium; vestibular membrane of cochlear duct; calvaria; otic placode; lumbar spinal ganglion; morula; genital tubercle; carotid body; right kidney; More reference expression data
BioGPS	n/a
Gene ontology
Molecular function	N-acetylglucosaminyldiphosphodolichol N-acetylglucosaminyltransferase activity
Cellular component	integral component of membrane; nuclear membrane; endoplasmic reticulum membrane; endoplasmic reticulum; membrane; nucleus; UDP-N-acetylglucosamine transferase complex
Biological process	dolichol-linked oligosaccharide biosynthetic process
Sources:Amigo / QuickGO
Orthologs
Databases	NCBI: entry; OMA: entry
Species	Human	Mouse
Entrez	199857	66789
Ensembl	ENSG00000172339	ENSMUSG00000039887
UniProt	Q96F25	Q9D081
RefSeq (mRNA)	NM_001305242; NM_144988	NM_024178
RefSeq (protein)	NP_001292171; NP_659425	NP_077140
Location (UCSC)	Chr 1: 94.97 – 95.07 Mb	Chr 3: 121.09 – 121.16 Mb
PubMed search
- Wikidata
View/Edit Human	View/Edit Mouse

UDP-N-acetylglucosamine transferase subunit ALG14 homolog is a protein that in humans is encoded by the ALG14 gene.

Asparagine (N)-glycosylation is an essential modification that regulates protein folding and stability. ALG13 and ALG14 (this protein) constitute the UDP-GlcNAc transferase, which catalyzes a key step in endoplasmic reticulum N-linked glycosylation.

== See also ==
- Congenital disorder of glycosylation
