= ALG13 =

Protein-coding gene in humans

Identifiers
- Aliases: ALG13, CDG1S, CXorf45, GLT28D1, MDS031, TDRD13, YGL047W, EIEE36, UDP-N-acetylglucosaminyltransferase subunit, ALG13 UDP-N-acetylglucosaminyltransferase subunit, DEE36
- External IDs: OMIM: 300776; MGI: 1914824; GeneCards: ALG13
Enzyme activity
EC #	BRENDA	ExPASy	KEGG	MetaCyc
2.4.1.141	↗	↗	↗	↗

Gene location (Human)
Chr.	X chromosome (human)
Band	Xq23	Start	111,665,811 bp
Band	Xq23	End	111,760,649 bp

Gene location (Mouse)
Chr.	X chromosome (mouse)
Band	X|X F2	Start	143,100,800 bp
Band	X|X F2	End	143,157,446 bp
RNA expression pattern
Bgee	Human / Mouse (ortholog); Top expressed in: Achilles tendon; right uterine tube; endothelial cell; mucosa of sigmoid colon; canal of the cervix; left ovary; body of uterus; anterior pituitary; left uterine tube; right ovary / Top expressed in: zygote; morula; primary oocyte; secondary oocyte; tail of embryo; embryo; yolk sac; blastocyst; spermatid; genital tubercle; More reference expression data
BioGPS	n/a
Gene ontology
Molecular function	thiol-dependent deubiquitinase; transferase activity; peptidase activity; cysteine-type peptidase activity; hexosyltransferase activity; protein binding; catalytic activity; hydrolase activity; glycosyltransferase activity; N-acetylglucosaminyldiphosphodolichol N-acetylglucosaminyltransferase activity; RNA binding
Cellular component	endoplasmic reticulum membrane; endoplasmic reticulum; UDP-N-acetylglucosamine transferase complex
Biological process	metabolism; proteolysis; dolichol-linked oligosaccharide biosynthetic process
Sources:Amigo / QuickGO
Orthologs
Databases	NCBI: entry; OMA: entry
Species	Human	Mouse
Entrez	79868	67574
Ensembl	ENSG00000101901	ENSMUSG00000041718
UniProt	Q9NP73	Q9D8C3
RefSeq (mRNA)	NM_001039210; NM_001099922; NM_001168385; NM_001257230; NM_001257231 NM_001257234; NM_001257235; NM_001257237; NM_001257239; NM_001257240; NM_001257241; NM_018466; NM_001324290; NM_001324291; NM_001324292; NM_001324293; NM_001324294; NM_024810	NM_026247
RefSeq (protein)	NP_001034299; NP_001093392; NP_001161857; NP_001244159; NP_001244160 NP_001244163; NP_001244164; NP_001244166; NP_001244168; NP_001244169; NP_001244170; NP_001311219; NP_001311220; NP_001311221; NP_001311222; NP_001311223; NP_060936	NP_080523
Location (UCSC)	Chr X: 111.67 – 111.76 Mb	Chr X: 143.1 – 143.16 Mb
PubMed search
- Wikidata
View/Edit Human	View/Edit Mouse

UDP-N-acetylglucosamine transferase subunit ALG13 homolog, also known as asparagine-linked glycosylation 13 homolog, is an enzyme that in humans is encoded by the ALG13 gene.

== Function ==
The protein encoded by this gene is a subunit of a bipartite UDP-N-acetylglucosamine transferase. It heterodimerizes with asparagine-linked glycosylation 14 (ALG14) homolog to form a functional UDP-GlcNAc glycosyltransferase that catalyzes the second sugar addition of the highly conserved oligosaccharide precursor in endoplasmic reticulum N-linked glycosylation.

== See also ==
- Congenital disorder of glycosylation
