= Amyloid-beta precursor protein secretase =

Type of enzyme

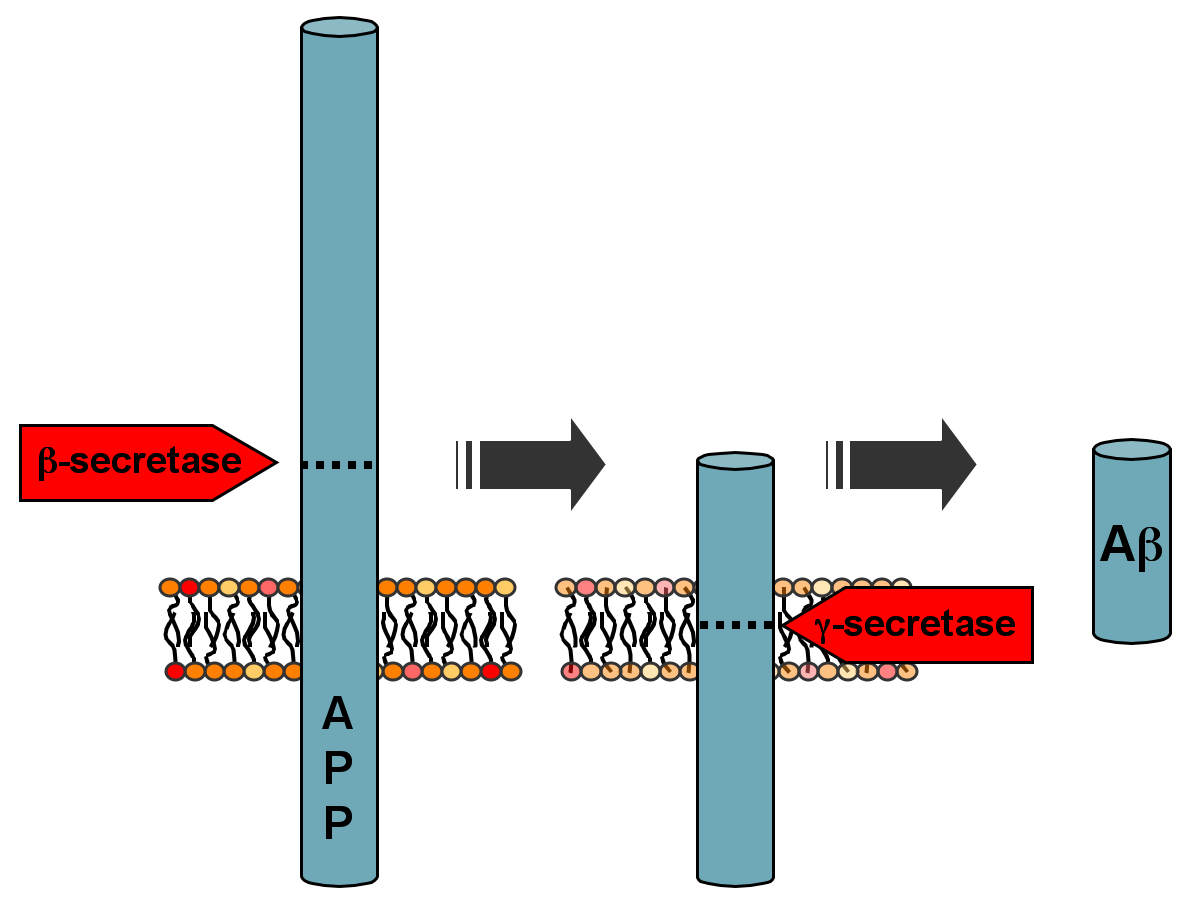
Processing of the amyloid-beta precursor protein

Secretases are enzymes that "snip" pieces off a longer protein that is embedded in the cell membrane.

Among other roles in the cell, secretases act on the amyloid-beta precursor protein (APP) to cleave the protein into three fragments. Sequential cleavage by beta-secretase 1 (BACE) and gamma-secretase (γ-secretase) produces the amyloid-beta peptide fragment that aggregates into clumps called amyloid plaques in the brains affected by Alzheimer's disease. If alpha-secretase (α-secretase) acts on APP first instead of BACE, no amyloid beta is formed because α-secretase recognizes a target protein sequence closer to the cell surface than BACE. The non-pathogenic middle fragment formed by an α/γ cleavage sequence is called P3.

== Structure ==
The structure of the three secretases varies widely.

- The α-secretase gene has not been conclusively identified but is believed to be a metalloproteinase.
- BACE is a transmembrane protein with an extracellular aspartic acid protease domain.
- γ-secretase is actually a protein complex containing presenilin, nicastrin, APH-1, and PEN-2. Presenilin is believed to harbor the protease domain and represents an important example of an uncommon type of protease that cleaves targets within the cell membrane.

== Function ==
Besides their involvement in the pathogenesis of Alzheimer's, these proteins also have other functional roles in the cell.

γ-secretase plays a critical role in developmental signalling by the transmembrane receptor Notch, freeing the cytoplasmic tail of Notch to travel to the cell nucleus to act as a transcription factor.

Although BACE cleaves the extracellular domains of several transmembrane proteins, its physiological function remains unknown.
