= Élan =

Irish pharmaceutical company

Elan Corporation plc
- Type: Public
- Traded as: NYSE: ELN
- Industry: Biotechnology
- Founded: Athlone, County Westmeath, Ireland (1969)
- Defunct: 2013
- Fate: Acquired by Perrigo
- Headquarters: Dublin, Ireland
- Key people: Robert Ingram, Chairman; Kelly Martin, CEO
- Products: PRIALT (ziconotide); NANOCRYSTAL technology In pipeline: TYSABRI (natalizumab); AZACTAM (aztreonam for injection, USP); MAXIPIME (cefepime hydrochloride) for Injection
- Revenue: $0.2 million USD (2012)
- Operating income: $(366.9) million USD (2012)
- Net income: $(363.9) million USD (2012)

Elan Corporation plc was a major drugs firm based in Dublin, Ireland, which had major interests in the United States. It was listed on the New York Stock Exchange as ELN, the Irish Stock Exchange as ELN.I, and the London Stock Exchange as ELN.L. In 2013, the company merged with Perrigo to form Perrigo Company PLC.

== History ==
The company was founded in Ireland by American businessman Don Panoz in 1969. In the late 1990s, its value on the Irish Stock Exchange reached over €20bn. However, in 2002, an accounting scandal and investor reactions to the global slump, caused a major devaluation resulting in a share price slump of over 90%. In July 2010, Élan was fined $203m for its marketing of epilepsy drugs.

In February 2013, Elan decided to dispose of the rights to sell Tysabri to Biogen Idec for $3.25 billion.

== Products in development ==
In neurology, Elan was focused on building upon its research and experience in the area of neuropathologies such as Alzheimer’s disease, where the company’s efforts included programs focused on small molecule inhibitors of beta-secretase and gamma secretase, enzymes whose actions are thought to affect the accumulation of the amyloid plaques found in the brains of patients with Alzheimer’s disease. An example of such a molecule is semagacestat. Elan also studied other neurodegenerative diseases, such as Parkinson's disease. Élan, in collaboration with Wyeth, conducted a Phase III clinical trial for bapineuzumab, an experimental humanized monoclonal antibody with a targeted indication of immunotherapeutic treatment of mild to moderate Alzheimer’s disease. This humanized monoclonal antibody is designed and engineered to clear the neurotoxic beta-amyloid peptide, that accumulates in the brains of patients with Alzheimer’s disease. Although initial results from an earlier Phase II clinical trial presented in July 2008 were inconclusive, Elan is hopeful that bapineuzumab will prove successful in the treatment of this disease.

In autoimmune diseases, Elan’s primary emphasis was studying cell trafficking to discover ways to provide disease-modifying therapies for autoimmune diseases such as rheumatoid arthritis, multiple sclerosis, and inflammatory bowel disease. Research efforts were also focused on physiological and neuropathic pain. Previously named Antegren, natalizumab is a drug co-marketed by Biogen Idec and Élan as "Tysabri". Tysabri is a monoclonal antibody that inhibits immune cells from crossing blood vessel walls to reach various tissues, including the brain. It has proven efficacy in the treatment of two serious autoimmune disorders: multiple sclerosis, and Crohn's disease.
