= RO4929097 =

Chemical compound

Identifiers
- IUPAC name: 2,2-Dimethyl-N-[(10S)-9-oxo-8-azatricyclo[9.4.0.02,7]pentadeca-1(15),2,4,6,11,13-hexaen-10-yl]-N-(2,2,3,3,3-pentafluoropropyl)propanediamide
- CAS Number: 847925-91-1
- PubChem CID: 49867930
- ChemSpider: 25027400
- UNII: KK8645V7LE
- CompTox Dashboard (EPA): DTXSID20233833

Chemical and physical data
- Formula: C_{22}H_{20}F_{5}N_{3}O_{3}
- Molar mass: 469.412 g·mol^{−1}
- 3D model (JSmol): Interactive image
- SMILES: O=C1Nc2ccccc2c2c(C1NC(=O)C(C(=O)NCC(C(F)(F)F)(F)F)(C)C)cccc2
- InChI: InChI=1S/C22H20F5N3O3/c1-20(2,18(32)28-11-21(23,24)22(25,26)27)19(33)30-16-14-9-4-3-7-12(14)13-8-5-6-10-15(13)29-17(16)31/h3-10,16H,11H2,1-2H3,(H,28,32)(H,29,31)(H,30,33)/t16-/m0/s1; Key:OJPLJFIFUQPSJR-INIZCTEOSA-N

RO4929097 (RG-4733) is a gamma secretase inhibitor being studied as an anti-cancer drug. Targeting gamma secretase inhibits NOTCH signaling, which is upregulated in many forms of cancer. The drug was initially developed by Roche for the treatment of Alzheimer's disease, but current research focuses on cancer. Production was halted in 2010, but began again in 2014.

== Research ==
Over 35 phase I and II clinical trials have been performed, but no phase III trials have yet commenced. Phase II studies have investigated the use of RO4929097 in ovarian cancer, renal cell carcinoma in patients that were unsuccessful on anti-VEGF treatments, metastatic pancreatic cancer, advanced brain tumors, and relapsed non-small cell lung cancer.

Other planned clinical trials were terminated, because the drug became unavailable.
