= GDP-fucose protein O-fucosyltransferase 1 =

Protein-coding gene in the species Homo sapiens

POFUT1

Identifiers
- Aliases: POFUT1, DDD2, FUT12, O-FUT, O-Fuc-T, O-FucT-1, OFUCT1, protein O-fucosyltransferase 1
- External IDs: OMIM: 607491; MGI: 2153207; GeneCards: POFUT1
Enzyme activity
EC #	BRENDA	ExPASy	KEGG	MetaCyc
2.4.1.221	↗	↗	↗	↗

Gene location (Human)
Chr.	Chromosome 20 (human)
Band	20q11.21	Start	32,207,880 bp
Band	20q11.21	End	32,238,658 bp

Gene location (Mouse)
Chr.	Chromosome 2 (mouse)
Band	2|2 H1	Start	153,083,453 bp
Band	2|2 H1	End	153,112,167 bp
RNA expression pattern
Bgee	Human / Mouse (ortholog); Top expressed in: stromal cell of endometrium; ventricular zone; islet of Langerhans; smooth muscle tissue; right lobe of liver; rectum; Achilles tendon; right coronary artery; thoracic aorta; ascending aorta / Top expressed in: epithelium of small intestine; epithelium of lens; migratory enteric neural crest cell; human fetus; umbilical cord; dermis; medullary collecting duct; ureter; endocardial cushion; Gonadal ridge; More reference expression data
BioGPS	n/a
Gene ontology
Molecular function	transferase activity; glycosyltransferase activity; peptide-O-fucosyltransferase activity; fucosyltransferase activity
Cellular component	endoplasmic reticulum; membrane
Biological process	somitogenesis; fucose metabolic process; protein glycosylation; development of the heart; protein O-linked glycosylation; protein O-linked fucosylation; regulation of transcription, DNA-templated; angiogenesis; nervous system development; embryo development; O-glycan processing; Notch signaling pathway; regulation of Notch signaling pathway; carbohydrate metabolic process
Sources:Amigo / QuickGO
Orthologs
Databases	NCBI: entry; OMA: entry
Species	Human	Mouse
Entrez	23509	140484
Ensembl	ENSG00000101346	ENSMUSG00000046020
UniProt	Q9H488	Q91ZW2
RefSeq (mRNA)	NM_015352; NM_172236	NM_001039055; NM_080463
RefSeq (protein)	NP_056167; NP_758436	NP_536711
Location (UCSC)	Chr 20: 32.21 – 32.24 Mb	Chr 2: 153.08 – 153.11 Mb
PubMed search
- Wikidata
View/Edit Human	View/Edit Mouse

protein O-fucosyltransferase 1
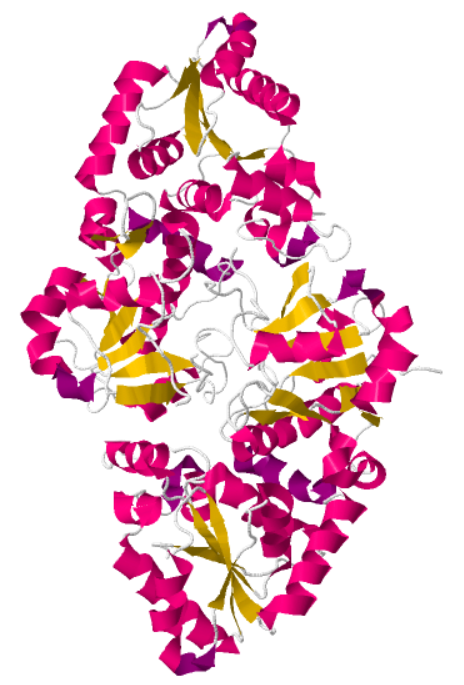

Identifiers
- Symbol: POFUT1
- NCBI gene: 23509
- HGNC: 14988
- OMIM: 607491
- RefSeq: NM_172236
- UniProt: Q9H488

Other data
- EC number: 2.4.1.221
- Locus: Chr. 20 q11
Search for
- Structures: Swiss-model
- Domains: InterPro

GDP-fucose protein O-fucosyltransferase 1 also known as peptide-O-fucosyltransferase 1 (O-FucT-1) is an enzyme that in humans is encoded by the POFUT1 gene.

POFUT-1 belongs to the O-Fuc family of proteins all which is involved in the transferring of o-fucose from GDP-β-L-fucose to substrates. POFUT-1 responsible for adding fucose sugars in O linkage to serine or threonine residues between the second and third conserved cysteines in EGF-like repeats on the Notch protein. The protein is an inverting glycosyltransferase, which means that the enzyme uses GDP-β-L-fucose as a donor substrate and transfers the fucose in O linkage to the protein producing fucose-α-O-serine/threonine.

When the gene for POFUT1 is knocked out, or the expression is decreased to very low levels, all Notch signaling is destroyed, which means that fucose on Notch is essential for Notch function. Why this is the case is not yet well understood.

Almost all glycosyltransferases reside in the Golgi apparatus. However, POFUT1 as well as the related enzyme POFUT2 have recently been shown to reside in the endoplasmic reticulum.

== Nomenclature ==
GDP-fucose protein O-fucosyltransferase 1 is also known as

- Protein O-fucosyltransferase
- O-FucT-1
- FUT12
- OFUCT1
- O-FUT

== Post-translational modification ==
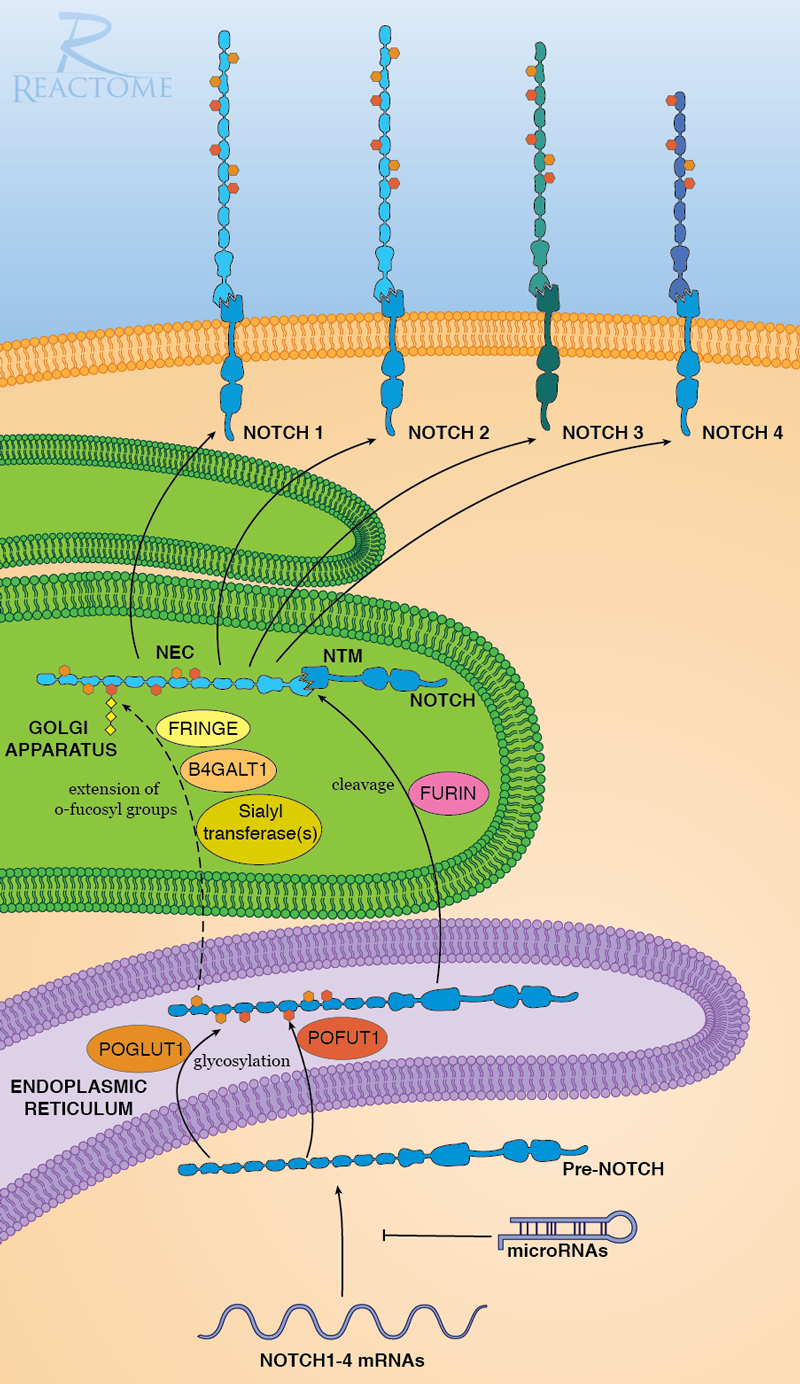
POFUT-1 is an important protein in the post transitional modification of the notch signal protein

POFUT-1 is involved in the attachment of fucose sugars to proteins, However a key pathway is the Post-transitional Modification of NOTCH signal proteins.

Pre-NOTCH proteins are translated and deposited in to the endoplasmic reticulum and are then first modified by POFUT-1 then by PGLUT-1 then exported the Golgi apparatus. in the endoplasmic reticulum POFUT-1 utilizes its sub-strait GDP-β-L-fucose as a donor for the five carbon sugar fucose. Fucose is then attached to a serine amino acid residue. Once Pre-notch is done being modified by POFUT-1 and POFUT-2, it is then exported to the Golgi apparatus where it is further modified and exported and incorporated into the cell membrane.

== Species distribution ==
As NOTCH signaling is conserved in most multi-cellular life, so to are the processes that are involved in the pathway. Because of NOTCH presence in most life forms, not just limited to the kingdom Animalia, it is also present in the kingdom Plantae and kingdom Fungi. There are several different Homologs in POFUT-1 present in many kingdoms of life.

== As a drug target ==
Because POFUT-1 is a key protein in the production of NOTCH signaling protein it has been the target of much research to disrupt it for the purpose of cancer treatment and prevention.
