= APH-1 =

Protein gene product

anterior pharynx defective 1 homolog A (C. elegans)

Identifiers
- Symbol: APH1A
- NCBI gene: 51107
- HGNC: 29509
- OMIM: 607629
- RefSeq: NM_016022
- UniProt: Q96BI3

Other data
- Locus: Chr. 1 p36.13-q31.3
Search for
- Structures: Swiss-model
- Domains: InterPro

anterior pharynx defective 1 homolog B (C. elegans)

Identifiers
- Symbol: APH1B
- NCBI gene: 83464
- HGNC: 24080
- OMIM: 607630
- RefSeq: NM_031301
- UniProt: Q8WW43

Other data
- Locus: Chr. 15 q22.2
Search for
- Structures: Swiss-model
- Domains: InterPro

APH-1 (anterior pharynx-defective 1) is a protein originally identified in the round worm Caenorhabditis elegans as a regulator of the cell-surface localization of nicastrin and an essential component in the Notch signaling pathway.

APH-1 homologs in other organisms, including humans (APH1A and APH1B), have since been identified as components of the gamma secretase complex along with the catalytic subunit presenilin and the regulatory subunits nicastrin and PEN-2. The gamma-secretase complex is a multimeric protease responsible for the intramembrane proteolysis of transmembrane proteins such as the Notch protein and amyloid precursor protein (APP). Gamma-secretase cleavage of APP is one of two proteolytic steps required to generate the peptide known as amyloid beta, whose misfolded form is implicated in the causation of Alzheimer's disease. All of the components of the gamma-secretase complex undergo extensive post-translational modification, especially proteolytic activation; APH-1 and PEN-2 are regarded as regulators of the maturation process of the catalytic component presenilin. APH-1 contains a conserved alpha helix interaction motif glycine-X-X-X-glycine (GXXXG) that is essential to both assembly of the gamma secretase complex and to the maturation of the components.

== Alternative splicing ==
In humans, the genes APH1A and APH1B encode the APH-1 proteins, which are integral components of the gamma-secretase complex, a multi-protein complex essential for the intramembrane cleavage of various substrates, including the amyloid precursor protein (APP) and Notch receptors. APH1A is located on chromosome 1q21.2, while APH1B is found on chromosome 15q22.2. Both genes exhibit alternative splicing, leading to the generation of multiple transcript variants that enhance the functional diversity of the gamma-secretase complex.

The alternative splicing of APH1A and APH1B contributes significantly to the regulation of gamma-secretase activity. Studies have shown that different isoforms of APH1 can modulate the cleavage of APP, influencing the production of amyloid-beta peptides, which are implicated in Alzheimer's disease. Moreover, the expression levels of these isoforms can vary in different tissues and under various pathological conditions, suggesting a complex regulatory mechanism that may have implications for diseases such as cancer and neurodegeneration. The involvement of APH1A and APH1B in the Notch signaling pathway further underscores their importance in developmental processes and cellular fate decisions, which can be disrupted in various cancers.

The functional versatility provided by the alternative splicing of APH1A and APH1B is crucial for the gamma-secretase complex's role in cellular signaling and proteolytic processing. For example, APH1A has been shown to be critical for the activity of the gamma-secretase complex, and its alternative splicing can influence the complex's substrate specificity and cleavage efficiency. Additionally, the interplay between APH1 isoforms and other components of the gamma-secretase complex, such as presenilins and nicastrin, is essential for maintaining the proper function of this protease.

== Differences between APH1A and APH1B ==
=== Expression patterns ===
APH1A and APH1B, while homologous, exhibit distinct expression patterns across various tissues. APH1A is known for its ubiquitous expression, with significantly higher levels observed in the brain, heart, and skeletal muscle. In contrast, APH1B displays a more restricted expression profile, being predominantly expressed in the brain and testis. This differential expression suggests that APH1A may play a more generalized role in cellular processes, while APH1B could be more specialized, particularly in neural and reproductive tissues. Recent studies have highlighted the potential of APH1B as a peripheral biomarker for Alzheimer's disease (AD). Specifically, dysregulated expression levels of APH1B in peripheral blood have been associated with brain atrophy and amyloid-β deposition in AD patients. This association indicates that APH1B could serve as a valuable indicator of disease progression, providing insights into the underlying pathological mechanisms of AD.

== Gamma-secretase activity ==
Functional studies have demonstrated that APH1A- and APH1B-containing gamma-secretase complexes exhibit distinct effects on enzyme activity and substrate processing. Notably, complexes containing APH1B have been shown to produce higher amounts of amyloid-beta 42 (Aβ42), a peptide closely linked to the pathology of Alzheimer's disease, compared to those containing APH1A. This difference in Aβ42 production is significant, as elevated levels of this peptide are associated with the formation of amyloid plaques, a hallmark of AD. The variations in substrate specificity and activity between the two isoforms could influence critical biological processes, including the processing of amyloid precursor protein (APP) and Notch signaling pathways. For instance, studies suggest that the presence of APH1B may lead to a shift in the cleavage patterns of APP, potentially favoring the production of longer and more pathogenic Aβ species. This altered processing could have profound implications for neuronal health and the progression of neurodegenerative diseases.

== Structure ==
APH-1 proteins, which include APH1A and APH1B, are classified as polytopic membrane proteins characterized by the presence of seven transmembrane domains (TMDs). This structural feature is crucial for their integration into cellular membranes and their interaction with other components of the gamma-secretase complex. The topology of APH-1 enables it to span the lipid bilayer multiple times, effectively creating a scaffold that supports the assembly and stability of the gamma-secretase complex.

The seven TMDs of APH-1 facilitate its proper localization within the membrane, allowing it to interact with other integral membrane proteins, such as presenilin and nicastrin, which are also essential components of the gamma-secretase complex. The arrangement of these transmembrane domains is vital for the functional integrity of the complex, as it influences the accessibility of substrates and the catalytic activity of the gamma-secretase. In addition to the transmembrane domains, APH-1 proteins contain a conserved GXXXG motif within their transmembrane regions. This motif is critical for mediating helix-helix interactions that are essential for the assembly of the gamma-secretase complex. The GXXXG motif facilitates the dimerization of transmembrane helices, promoting the stability and functionality of the protein complex. Furthermore, APH-1 contains other conserved sequences that play significant roles in maintaining the protein's stability and facilitating interactions with nicastrin and presenilin. These structural motifs and domains are not only important for the assembly of the gamma-secretase complex but also for its enzymatic activity. The interactions between APH-1 and other components are crucial for the proper processing of substrates, including amyloid precursor protein (APP) and Notch receptors, which are involved in critical cellular signaling pathways.

== Regulation of expression ==
=== Transcriptional ===
The expression of APH-1 genes, which include APH1A and APH1B, is regulated by several transcription factors and signaling pathways. One significant pathway involved in this regulation is the Notch signaling pathway, which can modulate the expression of APH-1, creating a feedback loop that adjusts gamma-secretase activity according to cellular needs. This interaction underscores the importance of APH-1 in cellular signaling and its potential role in maintaining homeostasis within the gamma-secretase complex.

Additionally, factors such as hypoxia-inducible factor (HIF) have been shown to influence APH-1 expression under specific physiological conditions, particularly in response to low oxygen levels. This suggests that APH-1 may play a role in cellular adaptation to hypoxic environments, further emphasizing its regulatory complexity.

=== Post-translational modifications ===
Post-translational modifications (PTMs) of APH-1, including glycosylation and phosphorylation, significantly affect the protein's stability, localization, and interactions within the gamma-secretase complex. Glycosylation, for instance, is a major PTM that can influence protein folding, stability, and interactions with other proteins. The addition of carbohydrate moieties can affect how APH-1 interacts with other components of the gamma-secretase complex, thereby impacting its overall function.

Phosphorylation is another critical PTM that can modulate APH-1 activity. It has been shown that phosphorylation can alter protein conformation, localization, and interaction dynamics, which are essential for the proper functioning of the gamma-secretase complex. The interplay between different types of PTMs can create a complex regulatory network that fine-tunes APH-1 activity in response to various cellular signals and conditions.

== Clinical significance ==
Altered expression of APH-1 genes has been investigated in the context of Alzheimer's disease and other neurological disorders. Variations in these genes may modulate disease risk or progression by affecting gamma-secretase activity and amyloid-beta production. Elevated expression of APH1B in peripheral blood has been associated with brain atrophy and increased amyloid-β deposition in Alzheimer's patients, indicating its potential as a biomarker.

=== As a drug target ===
Targeting APH-1 offers a potential therapeutic avenue for modulating gamma-secretase activity without completely inhibiting its function. Small molecules or peptides that specifically disrupt APH-1 interactions within the complex could reduce amyloid-beta production while minimizing side effects. Modulating the composition of the gamma-secretase complex to favor APH1A over APH1B may reduce the production of neurotoxic Aβ42 species.
