= TMEM59 =

Protein-coding gene in humans

Identifiers
- Aliases: TMEM59, C1orf8, HSPC001, DCF1, PRO195, UNQ169, transmembrane protein 59
- External IDs: OMIM: 617084; MGI: 1929278; GeneCards: TMEM59

Gene location (Human)
Chr.	Chromosome 1 (human)
Band	1p32.3	Start	54,026,681 bp
Band	1p32.3	End	54,053,504 bp

Gene location (Mouse)
Chr.	Chromosome 4 (mouse)
Band	4 C7|4 50.12 cM	Start	107,035,596 bp
Band	4 C7|4 50.12 cM	End	107,058,193 bp
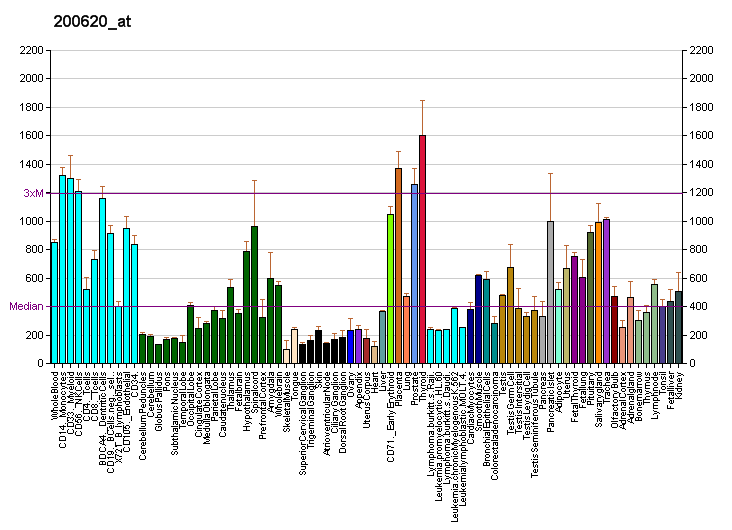
RNA expression pattern
Bgee	Human / Mouse (ortholog); Top expressed in: olfactory zone of nasal mucosa; parotid gland; bronchial epithelial cell; right uterine tube; C1 segment; rectum; corpus epididymis; stromal cell of endometrium; gallbladder; mucosa of sigmoid colon / Top expressed in: renal cortex; right kidney; proximal tubule; spermatocyte; olfactory epithelium; cochlea; stomach; synovial joint; lens; jejunum; More reference expression data
BioGPS	More reference expression data
Gene ontology
Molecular function	endopeptidase activity; protein binding
Cellular component	integral component of membrane; endosome; late endosome; Golgi apparatus; late endosome membrane; Golgi medial cisterna; membrane; Golgi membrane; plasma membrane; Golgi cis cisterna; lysosomal membrane; Golgi trans cisterna; lysosome; extracellular exosome
Biological process	positive regulation of autophagy; proteolysis; autophagy; negative regulation of protein processing; negative regulation of protein localization to plasma membrane
Sources:Amigo / QuickGO
Orthologs
Databases	NCBI: entry; OMA: entry
Species	Human	Mouse
Entrez	9528	56374
Ensembl	ENSG00000116209	ENSMUSG00000028618
UniProt	Q9BXS4	Q9QY73
RefSeq (mRNA)	NM_001305043; NM_001305049; NM_001305050; NM_001305051; NM_001305052 NM_001305066; NM_004872	NM_029565
RefSeq (protein)	NP_001291972; NP_001291978; NP_001291979; NP_001291980; NP_001291981 NP_001291995; NP_004863	NP_083841
Location (UCSC)	Chr 1: 54.03 – 54.05 Mb	Chr 4: 107.04 – 107.06 Mb
PubMed search
- Wikidata
View/Edit Human	View/Edit Mouse

Transmembrane protein 59 is a protein that in humans is encoded by the TMEM59 gene.

TMEM59 is a membrane bound protein that is localized to the Golgi apparatus. The precise function of TMEM59 is not known, however it has been demonstrated that expression of TMEM59 protein inhibits Golgi glycosylation of amyloid precursor protein (APP) and blocks APP cleavage by the α- and β-amyloid precursor protein secretases and therefore inhibits formation of the beta amyloid peptide that forms amyloid plaques in Alzheimer's disease. Moreover, TMEM59 has been shown to potentiate wnt signaling by promoting formation of the wnt receptor signalosomes. Transmembrane interactions between TMEM59 and the wnt receptor Frizzled were found to drive receptor multimerization that leads to improved potency and efficacy of wnt signaling.
