= Gamma-secretase-activating protein =

Protein-coding gene in the species Homo sapiens

GSAP

Identifiers
- Aliases: GSAP, PION, Protein pigeon homolog, gamma-secretase activating protein
- External IDs: OMIM: 613552; MGI: 2442259; HomoloGene: 45504; GeneCards: GSAP; OMA:GSAP - orthologs

Gene location (Human)
Chr.	Chromosome 7 (human)
Band	7q11.23	Start	77,310,751 bp
Band	7q11.23	End	77,416,349 bp

Gene location (Mouse)
Chr.	Chromosome 5 (mouse)
Band	5|5 A3	Start	21,391,253 bp
Band	5|5 A3	End	21,520,130 bp
RNA expression pattern
Bgee	Human / Mouse (ortholog); Top expressed in: granulocyte; right uterine tube; monocyte; spleen; right lung; epithelium of nasopharynx; visceral pleura; right lobe of thyroid gland; secondary oocyte; upper lobe of left lung / Top expressed in: lumbar spinal ganglion; granulocyte; right lung; spermatid; right lung lobe; right kidney; Rostral migratory stream; left lobe of liver; tibiofemoral joint; proximal tubule; More reference expression data
BioGPS	n/a
Gene ontology
Molecular function	amyloid-beta binding; protein binding
Cellular component	trans-Golgi network; Golgi apparatus
Biological process	regulation of proteolysis; positive regulation of amyloid-beta formation
Sources:Amigo / QuickGO
Orthologs
Species	Human	Mouse
Entrez	54103	212167
Ensembl	ENSG00000186088	ENSMUSG00000039934
UniProt	A4D1B5	Q3TCV3
RefSeq (mRNA)	NM_017439; NM_001350896; NM_001350897; NM_001350898; NM_001350899 NM_001350900; NM_001350901	NM_175437; NM_001359876; NM_001359877
RefSeq (protein)	NP_059135; NP_001337825; NP_001337826; NP_001337827; NP_001337828 NP_001337829; NP_001337830	NP_780646; NP_001346805; NP_001346806
Location (UCSC)	Chr 7: 77.31 – 77.42 Mb	Chr 5: 21.39 – 21.52 Mb
PubMed search
- Wikidata
View/Edit Human	View/Edit Mouse

Gamma-secretase-activating protein, also known as Protein pigeon homolog (PION) is a protein that in humans is encoded by the GSAP gene.

== Gene ==
The human PION gene is located on the long (q) arm of chromosome 7 at band 11.23, from base pair 76,778,007 to base pair 76,883,653. Highly conserved PION orthologs have been identified in most vertebrates for which complete genome data are available. More distantly related orthologs are also expressed in insects including the pigeon gene in Drosophila melanogaster that when mutated produces the "pigeon" phenotype. The name of the human PION gene derives the corresponding Drosophila gene.

pigeon

Identifiers
- Organism: Drosophila melanogaster
- Symbol: Pigeon
- Alt. symbols: Protein linotte
- Entrez: 35200
- RefSeq (mRNA): NM_057598
- RefSeq (Prot): NP_476946
- UniProt: Q24118

Other data
- Chromosome: 2L: 19.19 - 19.19 Mb
Search for
- Structures: Swiss-model
- Domains: InterPro

== Protein ==
The transcribed human pigeon homolog protein is 854 amino acid residues in length. A 16 kDa fragment (GSAP-16K) derived from 121 residues from the C-terminus region of the full length protein is known as the γ-secretase activating protein (GSAP).

== Function ==
γ-secretase activating protein (GSAP) increases β-amyloid production through a mechanism involving its interactions with both γ-secretase and its substrate, the amyloid precursor protein (APP). By binding to both the γ-secretase enzyme and its APP substrate, GSAP increases the affinity and the selectivity of the enzyme for this particular substrate.

== Therapeutic target for Alzheimer's disease ==
The activating function of GSAP can be inhibited by the anticancer drug imatinib (Gleevec) which in turn prevents γ-secretase from converting APP into plaque forming β-amyloid without affecting the other functions of γ-secretase. Imatinib itself does not get into the brain so imatinib could not be used as an AD therapeutic. However it may be possible to identify imatinib-like drugs that do get into the brain. Hence GSAP represents a potential therapeutic target for the treatment of Alzheimer's disease (AD).

The drug semagacestat in contrast to imatinib, works by directly inhibiting the γ-secretase. While semagacestat reduces β-amyloid plaque formation in AD patients, γ-secretase is also needed to make other important proteins. The failure of semagacestat to improve the cognitive function of AD patients may be due to its non-selective blockade of γ-secretase. The more selective blockade of γ-secretase provided by inhibiting GSAP may make GSAP a more efficacious and safer drug target than γ-secretase.

== Discovery ==
The PION gene was originally discovered through a large scale genome sequencing effort. However the function of the PION gene product remained a mystery. In the laboratory of Paul Greengard, a screen of compounds that could inhibit the formation of β-amyloid identified imatinib, however it was not immediately known how it accomplished this. Later it was discovered by Greengard's lab that imatinib inhibited the function of GSAP and that GSAP in turn functions as an activator of γ-secretase.
