= SPPL3 =

Protein-coding gene in the species Homo sapiens

Identifiers
- Aliases: SPPL3, IMP2, MDHV1887, PRO4332, PSH1, PSL4, UNQ1887, signal peptide peptidase like 3
- External IDs: OMIM: 608240; MGI: 1891433; GeneCards: SPPL3

Gene location (Human)
Chr.	Chromosome 12 (human)
Band	12q24.31	Start	120,762,510 bp
Band	12q24.31	End	120,904,358 bp

Gene location (Mouse)
Chr.	Chromosome 5 (mouse)
Band	5|5 F	Start	115,149,196 bp
Band	5|5 F	End	115,236,849 bp
RNA expression pattern
Bgee	Human / Mouse (ortholog); Top expressed in: skin of arm; skin of leg; mucosa of ileum; nipple; skin of abdomen; skin of thigh; skin of hip; secondary oocyte; mucosa of esophagus; human penis / Top expressed in: cumulus cell; corneal stroma; Ileal epithelium; lip; hair follicle; CA3 field; conjunctival fornix; perirhinal cortex; entorhinal cortex; ciliary body; More reference expression data
BioGPS	n/a
Gene ontology
Molecular function	protein homodimerization activity; aspartic-type endopeptidase activity; aspartic endopeptidase activity, intramembrane cleaving; peptidase activity; protein binding; hydrolase activity
Cellular component	integral component of membrane; rough endoplasmic reticulum; Golgi apparatus; endoplasmic reticulum membrane; membrane; intracellular membrane-bounded organelle; integral component of cytoplasmic side of endoplasmic reticulum membrane; plasma membrane; endoplasmic reticulum; Golgi-associated vesicle membrane; integral component of lumenal side of endoplasmic reticulum membrane; endoplasmic reticulum-Golgi intermediate compartment membrane; lysosomal membrane
Biological process	positive regulation of protein dephosphorylation; membrane protein proteolysis; positive regulation of cytosolic calcium ion concentration; proteolysis; membrane protein ectodomain proteolysis; positive regulation of protein binding; T cell receptor signaling pathway; positive regulation of calcineurin-NFAT signaling cascade; signal peptide processing
Sources:Amigo / QuickGO
Orthologs
Databases	NCBI: entry; OMA: entry
Species	Human	Mouse
Entrez	121665	74585
Ensembl	ENSG00000157837	ENSMUSG00000029550
UniProt	Q8TCT6	Q9CUS9
RefSeq (mRNA)	NM_139015	NM_029012
RefSeq (protein)	NP_620584	NP_083288
Location (UCSC)	Chr 12: 120.76 – 120.9 Mb	Chr 5: 115.15 – 115.24 Mb
PubMed search
- Wikidata
View/Edit Human	View/Edit Mouse

Signal peptide peptidase-like 3 is an enzyme that in humans is encoded by the gene SPPL3. This enzyme acts as an intramembrane protease, and is involved in T-cell receptor signaling.
