= Presenilin =

Family of related multi class transmembrane proteins

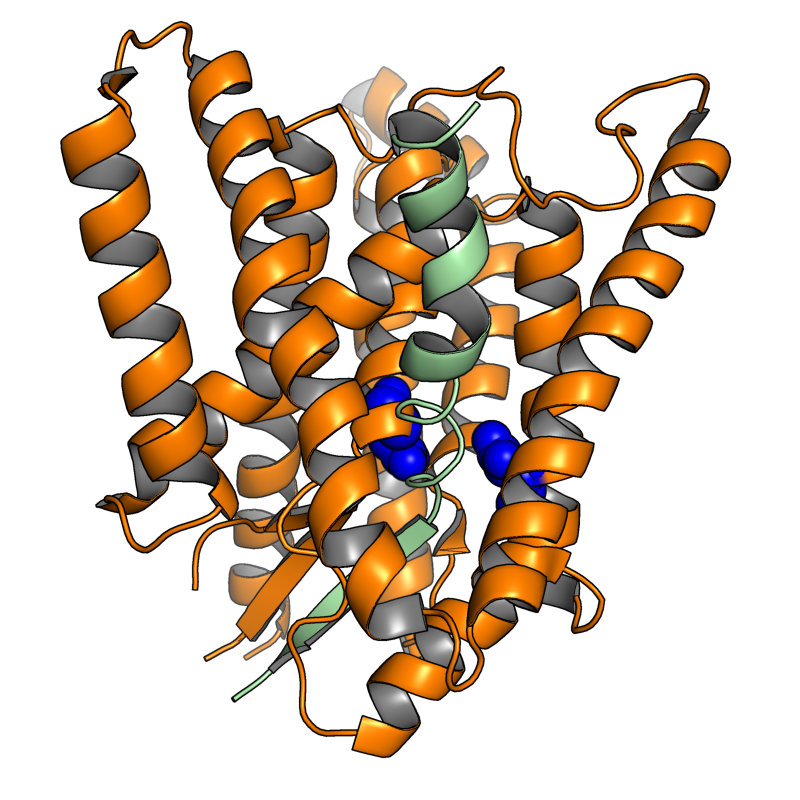
- Cryo-electron microscopy structure of the human presenilin-1 (orange) in complex with a fragment of one of its protein substrates, Notch (green). The two catalytic sites are shown in blue. Rendered from PDB: 6IDF.

Identifiers
- Symbol: Presenilin
- Pfam: PF01080
- Pfam clan: CL0130
- InterPro: IPR001108
- MEROPS: A22
- TCDB: 1.A.54
- OPM superfamily: 244
- OPM protein: 4hyg
Available protein structures:
- PDB: IPR001108 PF01080 (ECOD; PDBsum)
- AlphaFold: IPR001108; PF01080

presenilin 1 (Alzheimer's disease 3)

Identifiers
- Symbol: PSEN1
- Alt. symbols: AD3
- NCBI gene: 5663
- HGNC: 9508
- OMIM: 104311
- RefSeq: NM_000021
- UniProt: P49768

Other data
- EC number: 3.4.23.-
- Locus: Chr. 14 q24.3
Search for
- Structures: Swiss-model
- Domains: InterPro

presenilin 2 (Alzheimer's disease 4)

Identifiers
- Symbol: PSEN2
- Alt. symbols: AD4
- NCBI gene: 5664
- HGNC: 9509
- OMIM: 600759
- RefSeq: NM_000447
- UniProt: P49810

Other data
- EC number: 3.4.23.-
- Locus: Chr. 1 q31-q42
Search for
- Structures: Swiss-model
- Domains: InterPro

Presenilins are a family of related multi-pass transmembrane proteins which constitute the catalytic subunits of the gamma-secretase intramembrane protease protein complex. They were first identified in screens for mutations causing early onset forms of familial Alzheimer's disease by Peter St George-Hyslop. Vertebrates have two presenilin genes, called PSEN1 (located on chromosome 14 in humans) that codes for presenilin 1 (PS-1) and PSEN2 (on chromosome 1 in humans) that codes for presenilin 2 (PS-2). Both genes show conservation between species, with little difference between rat and human presenilins. The nematode worm C. elegans has two genes that resemble the presenilins and appear to be functionally similar, sel-12 and hop-1.

Presenilins undergo cleavage in an alpha helical region of one of the cytoplasmic loops to produce a large N-terminal and a smaller C-terminal fragment that together form part of the functional protein. Cleavage of presenilin 1 can be prevented by a mutation that causes the loss of exon 9, and results in loss of function. Presenilins play a key role in the modulation of intracellular Ca^{2+} involved in presynaptic neurotransmitter release and long-term potentiation induction.

== Structure ==
Presenilins are transmembrane proteins with nine alpha helices. Structures have been solved of the assembled gamma secretase complex by cryo-electron microscopy, demonstrating significant conformational flexibility in the structure of the presenilin subunit of the complex in response to ligand or inhibitor binding. Presenilins undergo autocatalytic proteolytic processing after expression, cleaving a cytoplasmic loop region between the sixth and seventh helices to produce a large N-terminal and a smaller C-terminal fragment. The two fragments remain in contact with each other in the mature protein. The two catalytic aspartate active site residues required for aspartyl protease activity are located in the sixth and seventh helices.

The structure and membrane topology of presenilins was originally controversial when they were first discovered. The PSEN1 gene was predicted to contain ten trans-membrane domains; models agreed on the expected topology of the N-terminal fragment, but the structure of the C-terminal fragment was disputed. A 2006 study suggested a nine-pass transmembrane topology with cleavage and assembly into the gamma-secretase complex prior to insertion into the plasma membrane. Solution NMR studies of the C-terminal fragment showed three helices likely to traverse the membrane, while X-ray crystallography studies of an archaeal homolog, as well as cryo-electron microscopy of the human gamma-secretase complex, indicate nine transmembrane helices.

== Function ==
=== Catalytic ===
Presenilins are the catalytic component of the gamma secretase intramembrane protease, a four-member protein complex consisting of presenilin, nicastrin, APH-1, and PEN-2. It has a very broad range of substrates for its proteolytic activity. Its substrates are hydrophobic single-pass transmembrane helices with relatively small extracellular regions. These substrates arise following ectodomain shedding. Well over 100 different integral membrane proteins are processed by gamma-secretase. The best-characterized gamma-secretase substrates are the Notch receptor and amyloid precursor protein (APP). Presenilins' role in the Notch signaling pathway is important in development; mice that have the PS1 gene knocked out die early in development from developmental abnormalities similar to those found when notch is disrupted. In conditional knockout mice where presenilin is only inactivated after early development, there is evidence that presenilins in their role as gamma-secretase components are important in the survival of neurons during aging.

There are subtle and species-specific variations in the roles of presenilin-1 and presenilin-2 in assembled gamma-secretase complexes, with many studies suggesting a primary role for presenilin-1. In humans, the two presenilins differ in subcellular localization, and may also be cell type and tissue-specific.

=== Non-catalytic ===
Presenilins also have additional non-catalytic roles in other cellular signaling processes, including calcium homeostasis, lysosomal acidification, autophagy, and protein trafficking. The proteins' role in calcium homeostasis in neurons has been a subject of interest. The genetic inactivation of presenilins in hippocampal synapses has shown this selectively affects the long-term potentiation caused by theta with the inactivation in presynapse but not the postsynapse impairing short-term plasticity and synaptic facilitation. The release of glutamate was also reduced in presynaptic terminals by processes that involve modulation of intracellular Ca^{2+} release. This has been suggested to "represent a general convergent mechanism leading to neurodegeneration".

Homologs have been identified and characterized in diverse eukaryotic organisms, including model organisms Drosophila melanogaster and Caenorhabditis elegans, plants such as Arabidopsis thaliana and Physcomitrella patens, and the slime mold Dictyostelium discoideum. In these functions presenilins are thought to play a role as scaffold proteins, considered likely to be the ancestral role of the protein family.

== Expression and distribution ==
Both human presenilins have widespread expression in the brain. The two proteins differ in subcellular localization, with PS1 expressed more broadly and present at the cell membrane, while PS2 is present mainly in late endosomes and lysosomes.

== Association with Alzheimer's disease ==
Most cases of Alzheimer's disease are not hereditary. However, there is a small subset of cases that have an earlier age of onset and have a strong genetic element. In patients with Alzheimer's disease (autosomal dominant hereditary), mutations in the presenilin proteins (PSEN1; PSEN2) or the amyloid precursor protein (APP) can be found. The majority of these cases carry mutant presenilin genes. An important part of the disease process in Alzheimer's disease is the accumulation of Amyloid beta (Aβ) protein. To form Aβ, APP must be cut by two enzymes, beta secretases and gamma secretase. Presenilin is the sub-component of gamma secretase that is responsible for the cutting of APP.

Gamma secretase can cut APP at several points within a small region of the protein, which results in Aβ of various lengths. The lengths associated with Alzheimer's disease are 40 and 42 amino acids long. Aβ 42 is more likely to aggregate to form plaques in the brain than Aβ 40. Presenilin mutations lead to an increase in the ratio of Aβ 42 produced compared to Aβ 40, although the total quantity of Aβ produced remains constant. This can come about by various effects of the mutations upon gamma secretase.

== Discovery ==
The genes for the presenilins were discovered in 1995 through linkage studies using mutations present in familial Alzheimer's disease cases. Around the same time, the presenilin homolog in Caenorhabditis elegans, sel-12, was independently identified as a contributor to Notch signaling. Although the function of the protein products of these genes was not immediately apparent, it became clear from subsequent work that the mutations were associated with higher proportions of Aβ42 over the less amyloidogenic Aβ40. The role of presenilins as the catalytic component of the gamma secretase protein complex was established by the early 2000s.
