= Semagacestat =

Chemical compound

Clinical data
- Other names: LY-450139
- Routes of administration: By mouth
- ATC code: None

Legal status
- Legal status: Development terminated

Pharmacokinetic data
- Metabolism: CYP3A4, 3A5
- Elimination half-life: 2.4 hours in circulation
- Excretion: 87% renal (44% unchanged, 43% as metabolites)

Identifiers
- IUPAC name: (2S)-2-Hydroxy-3-methyl-N-((1S)-1-methyl-2-{[(1S)-3-methyl-2-oxo-2,3,4,5-tetrahydro-1H-3-benzazepin-1-yl]amino}-2-oxoethyl)butanamide
- CAS Number: 425386-60-3
- PubChem CID: 9843750
- IUPHAR/BPS: 6978
- ChemSpider: 8019465
- UNII: 3YN0602W4W
- KEGG: D09377
- ChEMBL: ChEMBL520733
- CompTox Dashboard (EPA): DTXSID10235740
- ECHA InfoCard: 100.318.475

Chemical and physical data
- Formula: C_{19}H_{27}N_{3}O_{4}
- Molar mass: 361.442 g·mol^{−1}
- 3D model (JSmol): Interactive image
- SMILES: C[C@@H](C(=O)N[C@H]1C2=CC=CC=C2CCN(C1=O)C)NC(=O)[C@H](C(C)C)O
- InChI: InChI=1S/C19H27N3O4/c1-11(2)16(23)18(25)20-12(3)17(24)21-15-14-8-6-5-7-13(14)9-10-22(4)19(15)26/h5-8,11-12,15-16,23H,9-10H2,1-4H3,(H,20,25)(H,21,24)/t12-,15-,16-/m0/s1; Key:PKXWXXPNHIWQHW-RCBQFDQVSA-N

Semagacestat (LY-450139) was a candidate drug for a causal therapy against Alzheimer's disease. It was originally developed by Eli Lilly and Elan, and clinical trials were conducted by Eli Lilly. Phase III trials included over 3000 patients, but in August 2010, a disappointing interim analysis, in which semagacestat performed worse than the placebo, led to the trials being stopped.

== Mechanism of action ==
β-Amyloid is a peptide of 39 to 43 amino acids. The isoforms with 40 and 42 amino acids (Aβ40/42) are the main constituents of amyloid plaques in the brains of Alzheimer's disease patients. β-Amyloid is formed by proteolysis of amyloid precursor protein (APP). Research on laboratory rats suggest that the soluble form of this peptide is a causative agent in the development of Alzheimer's.

Semagacestat blocks the enzyme γ-secretase, which (along with β-secretase) is responsible for APP proteolysis.

== Clinical trials ==
Phase III double-blind clinical trials started in March 2008 with the IDENTITY study (Interrupting Alzheimer's dementia by evaluating treatment of amyloid pathology), including 1500 patients from 22 countries. This study was intended to run until May 2011. The successor trial with further 1500 patients, IDENTITY-2, started in September 2008. The open-label trial IDENTITY-XT, which included patients who have completed one of the two studies, started in December 2009. On 17 August 2010, it was announced that the phase III trials failed. Preliminary findings show that not only did semagacestat fail to slow disease progression, but that it was actually associated with “worsening of clinical measures of cognition and the ability to perform activities of daily living”. Furthermore, the incidence of skin cancer was significantly higher in the treatment group than the placebo group.

== Issues ==
A number of issues have already been raised during clinical trials:

- Phase I and II studies showed a decrease of Aβ40/42 concentration in the blood plasma about three hours after application of semagacestat, but an increase of 300% 15 hours after application. No reduction was shown in the cerebrospinal fluid. As a consequence, the phase III studies worked with much higher doses.
- γ-Secretase has other targets, for example the notch receptor. It is not known whether this could cause long-term side effects.
- In a 2008, histological analysis of post-mortem brains from deceased subjects who had previously been enrolled in a phase 1 study of an experimental vaccine (Elan AN1792) demonstrated that the drug appeared to have cleared patients of amyloid plaques but did not have any significant effect on their dementia, which in some people's mind cast doubt on the utility of approaches lowering β-amyloid levels.
- A notable feature of the results of the semagacestat phase III interim analysis is that subjects on treatment did significantly worse in cognitive assessment and activities of daily living than did subjects in the placebo group. This contrasts with the results from the phase III trial of Myriad's γ-secretase modulator tarenflurbil, which found that the subjects in the treatment group tracked the placebo control group very closely. The implications of this finding on other companies undertaking development of molecules targeting γ-secretase is not clear.
