= Sel-12 =

The Caenorhabditis elegans sel-12 gene encodes a multi-pass transmembrane domain protein that is similar to human presenilin. sel-12 positively regulates the lin-12 and glp-1 Notch signaling pathways during hermaphrodite gonadal, vulval, and germline development. sel-12 also plays a role in thermotaxis (the nematode worm prefers a certain temperature and moves accordingly).

C. elegans gene abbreviations: sel, Suppressor/Enhancer of Lin-12; lin, cell LINeage defective; glp, Germ Line Proliferation defective.
