= Nivegacetor =

Investigational gamma-secretase modulator

Identifiers
- IUPAC name: (7R)-7-(3,5-difluorophenoxy)-N-[(1S,5R)-3-(6-methoxypyridazin-4-yl)-3-azabicyclo[3.2.1]octan-8-yl]-6,7-dihydro-5H-pyrrolo[1,2-b][1,2,4]triazol-2-amine
- CAS Number: 2443487-67-8
- PubChem CID: 153606610
- IUPHAR/BPS: 13509
- UNII: SF4J7MVJ56
- KEGG: D13199

Chemical and physical data
- Formula: C_{23}H_{25}F_{2}N_{7}O_{2}
- Molar mass: 469.497 g·mol^{−1}
- 3D model (JSmol): Interactive image
- SMILES: COC1=NN=CC(=C1)N2C[C@H]3CC[C@@H](C2)C3NC4=NN5CC[C@H](C5=N4)OC6=CC(=CC(=C6)F)F
- InChI: InChI=1S/C23H25F2N7O2/c1-33-20-9-17(10-26-29-20)31-11-13-2-3-14(12-31)21(13)27-23-28-22-19(4-5-32(22)30-23)34-18-7-15(24)6-16(25)8-18/h6-10,13-14,19,21H,2-5,11-12H2,1H3,(H,27,30)/t13-,14+,19-,21?/m1/s1; Key:YYYGNCPNCFDABE-GMFBMTQSSA-N

Nivegacetor is an investigational gamma-secretase modulator being developed by Roche for the treatment of Alzheimer's disease. The compound is also known by its development code name RG6289 and represents a second-generation gamma-secretase modulator designed to selectively alter amyloid beta peptide production while avoiding the toxicity issues associated with first-generation compounds.

== Mechanism of action ==
Nivegacetor is a gamma-secretase modulator (GSM) that targets the gamma-secretase enzyme complex, which plays a central role in the production of amyloid beta peptides implicated in the pathogenesis of Alzheimer's disease. It specifically modulates the catalytic subunit presenilin-1 (PSEN1), stabilizing the interaction between the complex and the amyloid precursor protein (APP) at the enzyme's active site. This stabilization increases the processivity of APP cleavage—that is, the enzyme's ability to carry out sequential cleavage steps before releasing the APP substrate.

Unlike gamma-secretase inhibitors that completely block enzyme function and cause significant side effects, nivegacetor selectively reduces the production of amyloidogenic long amyloid beta peptides, particularly Aβ42 and Aβ40 that form insoluble amyloid fibrils, while simultaneously increasing the formation of shorter, non-amyloidogenic species such as Aβ38 and Aβ37. The compound demonstrates high potency with an IC_{50} below 10 nM for gamma-secretase modulation of APP cleavage, and importantly shows no effect on the processing of other gamma-secretase substrates, potentially avoiding the toxicity issues that plagued earlier compounds.

== Clinical development ==
=== Phase I studies ===
Nivegacetor has completed Phase I clinical trials in healthy volunteers, where it demonstrated a favorable safety profile and dose-dependent pharmacodynamic effects. The study showed that treatment with nivegacetor resulted in a dose-dependent shift in amyloid beta monomers in cerebrospinal fluid (CSF), with significant reductions in Aβ42 levels and corresponding increases in shorter amyloid beta species.

The Phase I results were presented at the 2023 Clinical Trials on Alzheimer's Disease (CTAD) conference, where researchers reported that nivegacetor appeared safe and effectively shifted amyloid beta production toward smaller, less aggregation-prone peptides.

=== Phase II studies ===
Based on the positive Phase I results, nivegacetor has been selected for advancement to Phase II clinical trials for Alzheimer's disease treatment. The dose selection for the Phase II study was informed by population pharmacokinetic/pharmacodynamic modeling derived from the Phase I data.

== Historical context ==
Nivegacetor represents a significant advancement in gamma-secretase modulator development, addressing the limitations of first-generation compounds that failed due to toxicology problems. Previous attempts at gamma-secretase modulation were hampered by safety concerns and off-target effects, leading to the discontinuation of several promising candidates in the 2000s and early 2010s. The development of nivegacetor as a second-generation GSM reflects improved understanding of gamma-secretase biology and more selective targeting approaches.
