= Presenilin-2 =

Protein found in humans

PSEN2

Identifiers
- Aliases: PSEN2, AD3L, AD4, CMD1V, PS2, STM2, presenilin 2
- External IDs: OMIM: 600759; MGI: 109284; GeneCards: PSEN2

Gene location (Human)
Chr.	Chromosome 1 (human)
Band	1q42.13	Start	226,870,184 bp
Band	1q42.13	End	226,927,726 bp

Gene location (Mouse)
Chr.	Chromosome 1 (mouse)
Band	1 H4|1 84.19 cM	Start	180,054,569 bp
Band	1 H4|1 84.19 cM	End	180,091,003 bp
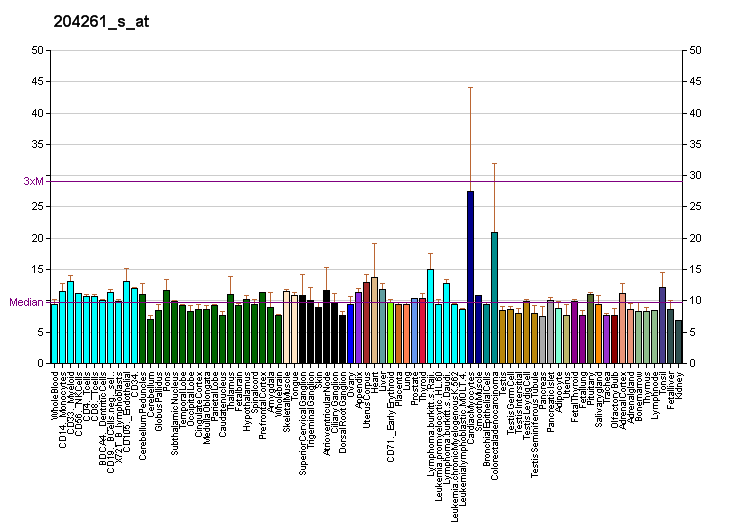

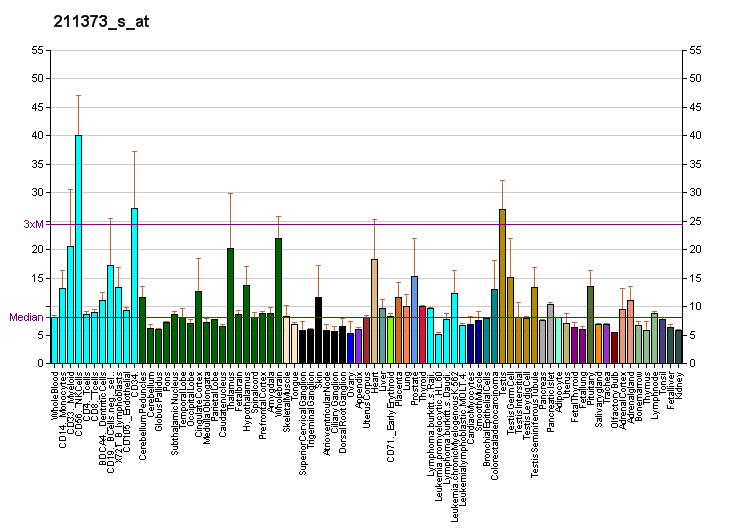

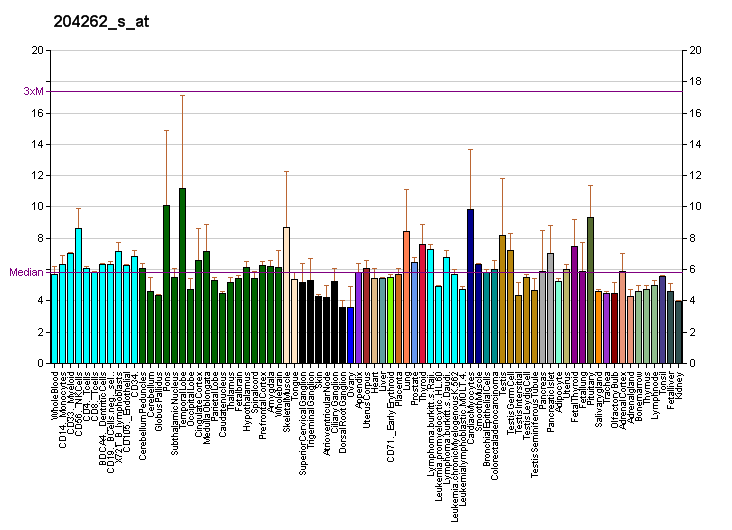
RNA expression pattern
Bgee	Human / Mouse (ortholog); Top expressed in: body of pancreas; testicle; muscle of thigh; skeletal muscle tissue; gastrocnemius muscle; islet of Langerhans; right adrenal gland; left adrenal cortex; right adrenal cortex; sural nerve / Top expressed in: left lobe of liver; olfactory epithelium; lumbar spinal ganglion; facial motor nucleus; granulocyte; mesenteric lymph nodes; stroma of bone marrow; primary oocyte; iris; ankle joint; More reference expression data
BioGPS	More reference expression data
Gene ontology
Molecular function	endopeptidase activity; peptidase activity; protein binding; hydrolase activity; aspartic endopeptidase activity, intramembrane cleaving; aspartic-type endopeptidase activity
Cellular component	integral component of membrane; centrosome; Golgi apparatus; endoplasmic reticulum membrane; membrane; Golgi membrane; plasma membrane; integral component of plasma membrane; soma; nuclear inner membrane; Z discdkac; endoplasmic reticulum; perinuclear region of cytoplasm; kinetochore; mitochondrial inner membrane; lysosomal membrane; cell cortex; cell surface; axon; growth cone; neuromuscular junction; ciliary rootlet; dendritic shaft; membrane raft; nucleus; early endosome; synaptic vesicle; apical plasma membrane; protein-containing complex; synaptic membrane; integral component of presynaptic membrane; intracellular anatomical structure
Biological process	Notch signaling pathway; intracellular signal transduction; response to hypoxia; ephrin receptor signaling pathway; protein processing; positive regulation of catalytic activity; negative regulation of apoptotic process; amyloid-beta metabolic process; proteolysis; membrane protein ectodomain proteolysis; membrane protein intracellular domain proteolysis; positive regulation of apoptotic process; Notch receptor processing; calcium ion transport; amyloid precursor protein catabolic process; Notch receptor processing, ligand-dependent; regulation of calcium import into the mitochondrion; mitochondrion-endoplasmic reticulum membrane tethering
Sources:Amigo / QuickGO
Orthologs
Databases	NCBI: entry; OMA: entry
Species	Human	Mouse
Entrez	5664	19165
Ensembl	ENSG00000143801	ENSMUSG00000010609
UniProt	P49810	Q61144
RefSeq (mRNA)	NM_000447; NM_012486	NM_001128605; NM_011183
RefSeq (protein)	NP_000438; NP_036618	NP_001122077; NP_035313
Location (UCSC)	Chr 1: 226.87 – 226.93 Mb	Chr 1: 180.05 – 180.09 Mb
PubMed search
- Wikidata
View/Edit Human	View/Edit Mouse

Presenilin-2 is a protein that (in humans) is encoded by the PSEN2 gene.

== Function ==
Alzheimer's disease (AD) patients with an inherited form of the disease carry mutations in the presenilin proteins (PSEN1; PSEN2) or the amyloid precursor protein (APP). These disease-linked mutations result in increased production of the longer form of amyloid-beta (main component of amyloid deposits found in AD brains). Presenilins are postulated to regulate APP processing through their effects on gamma-secretase, an enzyme that cleaves APP. Also, it is thought that the presenilins are involved in the cleavage of the Notch receptor, such that they either directly regulate gamma-secretase activity or themselves are protease enzymes. Two alternative transcripts of PSEN2 have been identified.

In melanocytic cells PSEN2 gene expression may be regulated by MITF.

== Interactions ==
PSEN2 has been shown to interact with:

- BCL2-like 1,
- CAPN1,
- CIB1,
- Calsenilin,
- FHL2,
- FLNB,
- KCNIP4,
- Nicastrin, and
- UBQLN1.
