= DAPT =

DAPT may refer to:

- Dual antiplatelet therapy, a preventative treatment against heart attack and stroke
- Domestic asset-protection trust, a financial arrangement available in some jurisdictions to protect assets from being squandered
- DAPT (chemical), a research ligand used to inhibit the Notch signaling pathway
