= DAPT (chemical) =

Names
- Systematic IUPAC name tert-Butyl (S)-{(2S)-2-[2-(3,5-difluorophenyl)acetamido]propanamido}phenylacetate
- Other names gamma-Secretase Inhibitor IX; GSI-IX; LY-374973; N-[N-(3,5-Difluorophenacetyl)-L-alanyl]-S-phenylglycine t-butyl ester

Identifiers
CAS Number	208255-80-5
3D model (JSmol)	Interactive image
ChEBI	CHEBI:86193
ChEMBL	ChEMBL255682
ChemSpider	4470783
PubChem CID	5311272
CompTox Dashboard (EPA)	DTXSID00415519
- InChI: InChI=1S/C23H26F2N2O4/c1-14(26-19(28)12-15-10-17(24)13-18(25)11-15)21(29)27-20(16-8-6-5-7-9-16)22(30)31-23(2,3)4/h5-11,13-14,20H,12H2,1-4H3,(H,26,28)(H,27,29)/t14-,20-/m0/s1 Key: DWJXYEABWRJFSP-XOBRGWDASA-N
- SMILES: C[C@@H](C(=O)N[C@@H](C1=CC=CC=C1)C(=O)OC(C)(C)C)NC(=O)CC2=CC(=CC(=C2)F)F

Properties
Chemical formula	C_{23}H_{26}F_{2}N_{2}O_{4}
Molar mass	432.468 g·mol^{−1}
- Except where otherwise noted, data are given for materials in their standard state (at 25 °C [77 °F], 100 kPa). Infobox references

DAPT is a chemical compound used in the study of the Notch signaling pathway. DAPT is a γ-secretase inhibitor. It indirectly inhibits Notch, which is a substrate for γ-secretase.

In a mouse model of Alzheimer's disease, DAPT reduces the levels of beta-amyloid.
