= PEN-2 =

Protein-coding gene in the species Homo sapiens

PSENEN

Identifiers
- Aliases: PSENEN, MSTP064, PEN-2, PEN2, MDS033, presenilin enhancer gamma-secretase subunit, ACNINV2, presenilin enhancer, gamma-secretase subunit
- External IDs: OMIM: 607632; MGI: 1913590; GeneCards: PSENEN
Available structures
PDB	Ortholog search: PDBe RCSB
PDB	List of PDB id codes 5A63, 5FN3, 5FN4, 5FN5, 5FN2

Gene location (Human)
Chr.	Chromosome 19 (human)
Band	19q13.12	Start	35,745,600 bp
Band	19q13.12	End	35,747,519 bp

Gene location (Mouse)
Chr.	Chromosome 7 (mouse)
Band	7|7 B1	Start	30,261,288 bp
Band	7|7 B1	End	30,263,052 bp
RNA expression pattern
Bgee	Human / Mouse (ortholog); Top expressed in: right uterine tube; olfactory zone of nasal mucosa; right testis; left testis; granulocyte; mucosa of transverse colon; C1 segment; blood; hypothalamus; apex of heart / Top expressed in: primary oocyte; secondary oocyte; zygote; thymus; urinary bladder; adrenal gland; white adipose tissue; granulocyte; islet of Langerhans; spleen; More reference expression data
BioGPS	n/a
Gene ontology
Molecular function	protein binding
Cellular component	Golgi apparatus; endoplasmic reticulum membrane; membrane; integral component of plasma membrane; Golgi cisterna membrane; endoplasmic reticulum; integral component of membrane; plasma membrane; gamma-secretase complex; endosome membrane; mitochondrion; integral component of presynaptic membrane
Biological process	Notch signaling pathway; protein processing; positive regulation of catalytic activity; membrane protein ectodomain proteolysis; Notch receptor processing; amyloid precursor protein catabolic process; amyloid-beta formation; amyloid precursor protein metabolic process; Notch receptor processing, ligand-dependent; membrane protein intracellular domain proteolysis; positive regulation of apoptotic process; ephrin receptor signaling pathway
Sources:Amigo / QuickGO
Orthologs
Databases	NCBI: entry; OMA: entry
Species	Human	Mouse
Entrez	55851	66340
Ensembl	ENSG00000205155	ENSMUSG00000036835
UniProt	Q9NZ42	Q9CQR7
RefSeq (mRNA)	NM_172341; NM_001281532; NM_018468	NM_025498; NM_001364016; NM_001364017
RefSeq (protein)	NP_001268461; NP_758844	NP_079774; NP_001350945; NP_001350946
Location (UCSC)	Chr 19: 35.75 – 35.75 Mb	Chr 7: 30.26 – 30.26 Mb
PubMed search
- Wikidata
View/Edit Human	View/Edit Mouse

PSENEN, formally PEN-2 (presenilin enhancer 2), is a protein that is a regulatory component of the gamma secretase complex, a protease complex responsible for proteolysis of transmembrane proteins such as the Notch protein and amyloid precursor protein (APP). The gamma secretase complex consists of PEN-2, APH-1, nicastrin, and the catalytic subunit presenilin. PEN-2 is a 101-amino acid integral membrane protein likely with a topology such that both the N-terminus and the C-terminus face first the lumen of the endoplasmic reticulum and later the extracellular environment. Biochemical studies have shown that a conserved sequence motif D-Y-L-S-F at the C-terminus, as well as the overall length of the C-terminal tail, is required for the formation of an active gamma secretase complex.

PEN-2 binds to metformin at therapeutic concentration and may be responsible for its AMPK-activating effects. PEN2-metformin in turn binds to ATP6AP1 to inhibit v-ATPase activity.
