= Presenilin-1 =

Protein-coding gene in the species Homo sapiens

PSEN1

Identifiers
- Aliases: PSEN1, Psen1, Ad3h, PS-1, PS1, S182, AD3, FAD, presenilin 1, ACNINV3
- External IDs: OMIM: 104311; MGI: 1202717; GeneCards: PSEN1
Available structures
PDB	Ortholog search: PDBe RCSB
PDB	List of PDB id codes 2KR6, 5A63, 4UIS, 5FN3, 5FN4, 5FN5, 5FN2

Gene location (Human)
Chr.	Chromosome 14 (human)
Band	14q24.2	Start	73,136,418 bp
Band	14q24.2	End	73,223,691 bp

Gene location (Mouse)
Chr.	Chromosome 12 (mouse)
Band	12 D1|12 38.84 cM	Start	83,734,926 bp
Band	12 D1|12 38.84 cM	End	83,781,973 bp
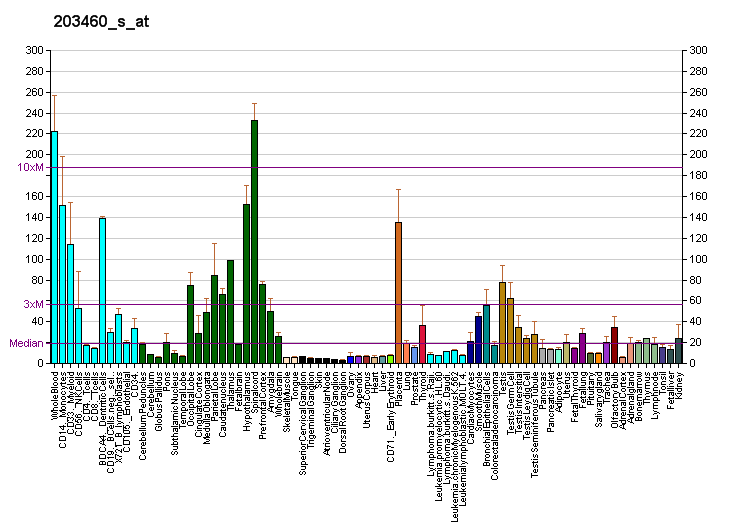

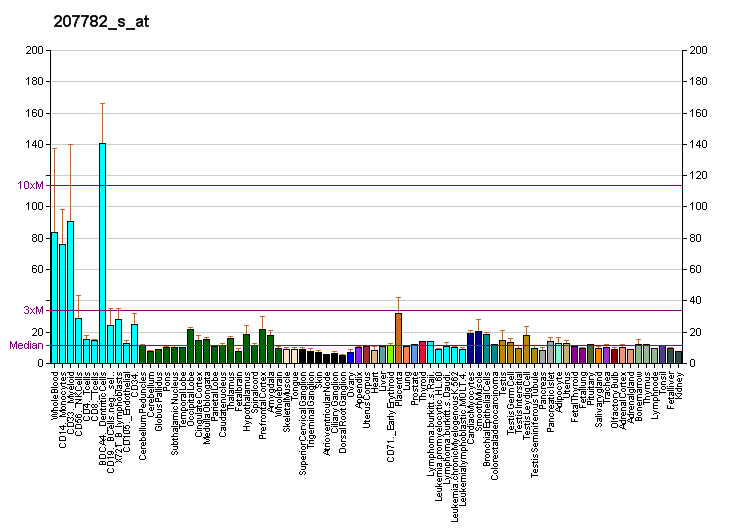
RNA expression pattern
Bgee	Human / Mouse (ortholog); Top expressed in: middle frontal gyrus; corpus callosum; C1 segment; monocyte; rectum; Achilles tendon; mucosa of ileum; sural nerve; amniotic fluid; blood / Top expressed in: transitional epithelium of urinary bladder; seminiferous tubule; primary oocyte; left colon; submandibular gland; granulocyte; ileum; ankle; spermatid; zygote; More reference expression data
BioGPS	More reference expression data
Gene ontology
Molecular function	PDZ domain binding; cadherin binding; peptidase activity; beta-catenin binding; protein binding; calcium channel activity; aspartic-type endopeptidase activity; endopeptidase activity; hydrolase activity; aspartic endopeptidase activity, intramembrane cleaving
Cellular component	nuclear membrane; membrane; mitochondrion; ciliary rootlet; neuron projection; gamma-secretase complex; nucleus; kinetochore; centrosome; rough endoplasmic reticulum; dendritic shaft; aggresome; cell surface; membrane-bounded organelle; endoplasmic reticulum; membrane raft; Golgi apparatus; growth cone; neuromuscular junction; intracellular anatomical structure; axon; nuclear outer membrane; endoplasmic reticulum membrane; Golgi membrane; integral component of plasma membrane; smooth endoplasmic reticulum; lysosomal membrane; cell junction; dendrite; presynapse; mitochondrial inner membrane; cytoplasmic vesicle; cytoplasm; plasma membrane; cell cortex; integral component of membrane; azurophil granule membrane; Z discdkac; soma; perinuclear region of cytoplasm; early endosome; synaptic vesicle; protein-containing complex; sarcolemma; synapse; synaptic membrane; integral component of presynaptic membrane; endosome; early endosome membrane; cell projection
Biological process	negative regulation of neuron apoptotic process; somitogenesis; positive regulation of protein phosphorylation; positive regulation of MAP kinase activity; positive regulation of catalytic activity; mitochondrial transport; post-embryonic development; positive regulation of dendritic spine development; cellular response to DNA damage stimulus; heart looping; blood vessel development; membrane protein ectodomain proteolysis; regulation of epidermal growth factor-activated receptor activity; regulation of resting membrane potential; regulation of synaptic transmission, glutamatergic; amyloid precursor protein catabolic process; apoptotic process; thymus development; positive regulation of coagulation; negative regulation of apoptotic signaling pathway; neuron development; memory; endoplasmic reticulum calcium ion homeostasis; response to oxidative stress; autophagosome assembly; positive regulation of transcription, DNA-templated; development of the heart; negative regulation of axonogenesis; embryonic limb morphogenesis; locomotion; learning or memory; protein transport; cerebral cortex cell migration; positive regulation of proteasomal ubiquitin-dependent protein catabolic process; L-glutamate transmembrane transport; brain morphogenesis; Notch signaling pathway; negative regulation of protein phosphorylation; myeloid leukocyte differentiation; neuron apoptotic process; smooth endoplasmic reticulum calcium ion homeostasis; synaptic vesicle targeting; Cajal-Retzius cell differentiation; skin morphogenesis; negative regulation of protein kinase activity; cell fate specification; skeletal system morphogenesis; regulation of phosphorylation; cellular calcium ion homeostasis; epithelial cell proliferation; neuron migration; negative regulation of apoptotic process; negative regulation of transcription by RNA polymerase II; proteolysis; regulation of synaptic plasticity; negative regulation of epidermal growth factor-activated receptor activity; cell adhesion; hematopoietic progenitor cell differentiation; neuron differentiation; cerebral cortex development; canonical Wnt signaling pathway; dorsal/ventral neural tube patterning; neural retina development; positive regulation of protein kinase activity; T cell activation involved in immune response; neurogenesis; intracellular signal transduction; protein processing; protein maturation; myeloid dendritic cell differentiation; autophagy; protein glycosylation; brain development; negative regulation of ubiquitin-protein transferase activity; choline transport; positive regulation of apoptotic process; Notch receptor processing; negative regulation of ubiquitin-dependent protein catabolic process; forebrain development; regulation of protein binding; T cell receptor signaling pathway; segmentation; positive regulation of receptor recycling; calcium ion transmembrane transport; amyloid-beta formation; amyloid precursor protein metabolic process; neutrophil degranulation; regulation of canonical Wnt signaling pathway; amyloid-beta metabolic process; positive regulation of L-glutamate import across plasma membrane; astrocyte activation involved in immune response; regulation of neuron projection development; cerebellum development; positive regulation of protein binding; Notch receptor processing, ligand-dependent; positive regulation of phosphorylation; astrocyte activation; synapse organization; cell-cell adhesion; cellular response to amyloid-beta; negative regulation of core promoter binding; negative regulation of low-density lipoprotein receptor activity; positive regulation of amyloid fibril formation; neuron projection maintenance; membrane protein intracellular domain proteolysis; positive regulation of protein import into nucleus; ephrin receptor signaling pathway; positive regulation of gene expression; negative regulation of gene expression; positive regulation of glycolytic process
Sources:Amigo / QuickGO
Orthologs
Databases	NCBI: entry; OMA: entry
Species	Human	Mouse
Entrez	5663	19164
Ensembl	ENSG00000080815	ENSMUSG00000019969
UniProt	P49768	P49769
RefSeq (mRNA)	NM_000021; NM_007318; NM_007319	NM_008943; NM_001362271
RefSeq (protein)	NP_000012; NP_015557	NP_001349200
Location (UCSC)	Chr 14: 73.14 – 73.22 Mb	Chr 12: 83.73 – 83.78 Mb
PubMed search
- Wikidata
View/Edit Human	View/Edit Mouse

Presenilin-1 (PS-1) is a presenilin protein that in humans is encoded by the PSEN1 gene. Presenilin-1 is one of the four core proteins in the gamma secretase complex, which is considered to play an important role in generation of amyloid beta (Aβ) from amyloid-beta precursor protein (APP). Accumulation of amyloid beta is associated with the onset of Alzheimer's disease.

== Structure ==
Presenilin possesses a 9 transmembrane domain topology, with an extracellular C-terminus and a cytosolic N-terminus. Presenilin undergoes endo-proteolytic processing to produce ~27-28 kDa N-terminal and ~16-17 kDa C-terminal fragments in humans. Furthermore, presenilin exists in the cell mainly as a heterodimer of the C-terminal and N-terminus fragments. When presenilin 1 is overexpressed, the full length protein accumulates in an inactive form. Based on evidence that a gamma-secretase inhibitor binds to the fragments, the cleaved presenilin complex is considered to be the active form.

== Function ==
Presenilins are postulated to regulate APP processing through their effects on gamma secretase, an enzyme that cleaves APP. Also, it is thought that the presenilins are involved in the cleavage of the Notch receptor, such that they either directly regulate gamma secretase activity or themselves are protease enzymes. Multiple alternatively spliced transcript variants have been identified for this gene, the full-length natures of only some have been determined.

=== Notch signaling pathway ===
In Notch signaling, critical proteolytic reactions takes place during maturation and activation of Notch membrane receptor. Notch1 is cleaved extracellularlly at site1 (S1) and two polypeptides are produced to form a heterodimer receptor on the cell surface. After the formation of receptor, Notch1 is further cleaved in site 3(S3) and release Notch1 intracellular domain (NICD) from the membrane.

Presenilin 1 has been shown to play an important role in proteolytic process. In the prenilin 1 null mutant drosophila, Notch signaling is abolished and it displays a notch-like lethal phenotype. Moreover, in mammalian cells, deficiency of PSEN1 also causes the defect in the proteolytic release of NICD from a truncated Notch construct. The same step can be also blocked by several gamma-secretase inhibitors, shown in the same study. These evidences collectively suggest a critical role of presenilin 1 in the Notch signaling pathway.

=== Wnt signaling pathway ===
Wnt signaling pathway has been shown to be involved in several critical steps in embryogenesis and development. Presenilin 1 has been shown to form a complex with beta-catenin, an important component in Wnt signaling, and stabilize beta-catenin. Mutant of presenilin-1 that reduces the ability to stabilize beta-catenin complex leads to hyperactive degradation of beta-catenin in the brains of transgenic mice.

Considered as a negative regulator in Wnt signaling pathway, presenilin-1 was also found to play a role in beta-catenin phosphorylation. Beta-catenin is coupled by presenilin-1 and undergoes a sequential phosphorylation by two kinase activities. The study also further illustrates that the deficiency of presenilin 1 disconnects the sequential phosphorylation and thus disrupts the normal wnt signaling pathway.

== Clinical significance ==
=== Beta-amyloid production ===
Transgenic mice that over-expressed mutant presenilin-1 show an increase of beta-amyloid-42(43) in the brain, which suggest presenilin-1 plays an important role in beta-amyloid regulation and can be highly related to Alzheimer's disease. Further study conducted in neuronal cultures derived from presenilin-1 deficient mouse embryos showed that cleavage by alpha- and beta- secretase was still normal without the presence of presenilin-1. Meanwhile, when the cleavage by gamma-cleavage of the transmembrane domain of APP was abolished a 5-fold drop of amyloid peptide was observed, suggesting that deficiency of presenilin-1 can downregulate amyloid and inhibition of presenilin-1 can be a potential method for anti-amyloidogenic therapy in Alzheimer's disease. Extensive study on the role of presenilin-1 in amyloid production has been conducted to improve our understanding of Alzheimer's disease.

=== Alzheimer's disease ===
Alzheimer's disease (AD) patients with an inherited form of the disease may carry mutations in the presenilin proteins (PSEN1; PSEN2) or the amyloid precursor protein (APP). These disease-linked mutations result in increased production of the longer form of amyloid beta (main component of amyloid deposits found in AD brains). These mutations result in early-onset Alzheimer's Disease, which is a rare form of the disease. These rare genetic variants are autosomal dominant.

=== Cancer ===
In addition to its role in Alzheimer's disease, presenilin-1 also found to be important in cancer. A study of broad range gene expression was conducted on human melanoma. Researchers classified the melanoma cell lines into two types. The study showed that presenilin-1 is down regulated in this cell type while it is overexpressed in the other cell type. Another study on multidrug resistance (MDR) cell line also reveals a role of presenilin-1 in cancer development. Because of the development to the resistance to chemicals, MDR cells become a critical factor on the success of cancer chemotherapy. In the study, researchers tried to explore the molecular mechanism by looking into the expression of Notch1 intracellular (N1IC) domain and presenilin 1. They found that there is higher level expression of both proteins and a multidrug resistance-associated protein 1 (ABCC1) was also found to be regulated by N1IC, which suggest a mechanism of ABCC1 regulated by presenilin 1 and notch signaling.

== Interactions ==
PSEN1 has been shown to interact with:

- BCL2,
- CTNNB1,
- CTNND1,
- FLNB,
- GFAP,
- Delta catenin,
- ICAM5,
- KCNIP3,
- NCSTN,
- PKP4, and
- UBQLN1.
