= GDP-fucose protein O-fucosyltransferase 2 =

Mammalian protein found in Homo sapiens

POFUT2

Identifiers
- Aliases: POFUT2, C21orf80, FUT13, protein O-fucosyltransferase 2
- External IDs: OMIM: 610249; MGI: 1916863; GeneCards: POFUT2
Available structures
PDB	Ortholog search: PDBe RCSB
PDB	List of PDB id codes 4AP5, 4AP6
Enzyme activity
EC #	BRENDA	ExPASy	KEGG	MetaCyc
2.4.1.221	↗	↗	↗	↗

Gene location (Human)
Chr.	Chromosome 21 (human)
Band	21q22.3	Start	45,263,928 bp
Band	21q22.3	End	45,287,898 bp

Gene location (Mouse)
Chr.	Chromosome 10 (mouse)
Band	10|10 C1	Start	77,095,052 bp
Band	10|10 C1	End	77,105,409 bp
RNA expression pattern
Bgee	Human / Mouse (ortholog); Top expressed in: right uterine tube; stromal cell of endometrium; anterior pituitary; right lobe of thyroid gland; canal of the cervix; left lobe of thyroid gland; left ovary; sural nerve; pancreatic ductal cell; right ovary / Top expressed in: external carotid artery; internal carotid artery; fossa; condyle; vas deferens; Gonadal ridge; human fetus; molar; body of femur; umbilical cord; More reference expression data
BioGPS	n/a
Gene ontology
Molecular function	transferase activity; fucosyltransferase activity; glycosyltransferase activity; peptide-O-fucosyltransferase activity
Cellular component	Golgi apparatus; endoplasmic reticulum; endoplasmic reticulum membrane
Biological process	regulation of gene expression; fucose metabolic process; protein glycosylation; regulation of epithelial to mesenchymal transition; mesoderm formation; regulation of secretion; protein O-linked fucosylation; fucosylation; carbohydrate metabolic process
Sources:Amigo / QuickGO
Orthologs
Databases	NCBI: entry; OMA: entry
Species	Human	Mouse
Entrez	23275	80294
Ensembl	ENSG00000186866	ENSMUSG00000020260
UniProt	Q9Y2G5	Q8VHI3
RefSeq (mRNA)	NM_015227; NM_133634; NM_133635	NM_030262
RefSeq (protein)	NP_056042; NP_598368	NP_084538
Location (UCSC)	Chr 21: 45.26 – 45.29 Mb	Chr 10: 77.1 – 77.11 Mb
PubMed search
- Wikidata
View/Edit Human	View/Edit Mouse

GDP-fucose protein O-fucosyltransferase 2 (POFUT2) is an enzyme responsible for adding fucose sugars in O linkage to serine or threonine residues in Thrombospondin repeats. The protein is an inverting glycosyltransferase, which means that the enzyme uses GDP-β-L-fucose as a donor substrate and transfers the fucose in O linkage to the protein producing fucose-α-O-serine/threonine.

Almost all glycosyltransferases reside in the Golgi apparatus. However, POFUT2 as well as the related enzyme POFUT1 have recently been shown to reside in the endoplasmic reticulum.

The malaria parasite Plasmodium falciparum requires POFUT2 for efficient transmission to mosquitoes and infection of human liver cells.

== See also ==
- Peptide-O-fucosyltransferase
