= Intramembrane protease =

Intramembrane cellular enzymes

Intramembrane proteases (IMPs), also known as intramembrane-cleaving proteases (I-CLiPs), are enzymes that have the property of cleaving transmembrane domains of integral membrane proteins. All known intramembrane proteases are themselves integral membrane proteins with multiple transmembrane domains, and they have their active sites buried within the lipid bilayer of cellular membranes. Intramembrane proteases are responsible for proteolytic cleavage in the cell signaling process known as regulated intramembrane proteolysis (RIP).

Intramembrane proteases are not evolutionarily related to classical soluble proteases, having evolved their catalytic sites by convergent evolution.

Although only recently discovered, intramembrane proteases are of significant research interest because of their major biological functions and their relevance to human disease.

== Classification ==
There are four groups of intramembrane proteases, distinguished by their catalytic mechanism:

- Metalloproteases: Site-2 protease (S2P) and S2P-like proteases
- Aspartyl proteases: this group includes presenilin, the active subunit of gamma secretase and signal peptide peptidases (SPPs) and SPP-like proteases, which are distantly related to presenilin but have opposite membrane orientation
- Serine proteases: rhomboid proteases
- Glutamyl proteases: only one example is known, Rce1.

== Structure ==
Intramembrane proteases are integral membrane proteins that are polytopic transmembrane proteins with multiple transmembrane helices. Their active sites are located within the transmembrane helices and form an aqueous environment within the hydrophobic lipid bilayer. Most intramembrane proteases are thought to function as monomers, with the notable exception of presenilin which is active only in the gamma-secretase protein complex.

Examples of all four groups of intramembrane proteases have been structurally characterized by X-ray crystallography or cryo-electron microscopy.

== Enzymatic activity ==
Three of the four groups of intramembrane proteases cleave their substrates within transmembrane domains and the scissile bond is located inside the membrane. The remaining group, Rce1 glutamyl proteases, cleaves the C-terminus of CAAX proteins. The kinetics of intramembrane proteases are generally slower than soluble proteases. Substrate specificity is not well understood and varies significantly between enzymes, with the gamma-secretase complex in particular known for its substrate promiscuity. Both rhomboid protease and gamma-secretase have been reported to have an unusual substrate recognition mechanism by distinguishing substrates from non-substrates only after forming a protein complex, giving rise to their slow enzyme kinetics.

== Distribution ==
Intramembrane proteases are found in all domains of life, and all four groups are widely distributed. In eukaryotes, all membrane-bound organelles except peroxisomes have at least one intramembrane protease.

== Discovery ==
Although soluble proteases are among the earliest and best characterized enzymes, intramembrane proteases were discovered relatively recently. Intramembrane proteolysis was proposed in the 1990s by researchers studying Alzheimer's disease, such as Dennis Selkoe, as a possible mechanism for the processing of amyloid precursor protein. The possibility of hydrolysis occurring within the hydrophobic membrane was initially controversial. The first intramembrane protease to be experimentally identified was site-2 protease in 1997.
