= Nicastrin =

Protein found in humans

NCSTN

Identifiers
- Aliases: NCSTN, ATAG1874, nicastrin
- External IDs: OMIM: 605254; MGI: 1891700; GeneCards: NCSTN
Available structures
PDB	Ortholog search: PDBe RCSB
PDB	List of PDB id codes 4UPC, 5A63, 4UIS, 5FN3, 5FN4, 5FN5, 5FN2, 2N7R, 2N7Q

Gene location (Human)
Chr.	Chromosome 1 (human)
Band	1q23.2	Start	160,343,316 bp
Band	1q23.2	End	160,358,952 bp

Gene location (Mouse)
Chr.	Chromosome 1 (mouse)
Band	1 H3|1 79.54 cM	Start	171,893,580 bp
Band	1 H3|1 79.54 cM	End	171,910,362 bp
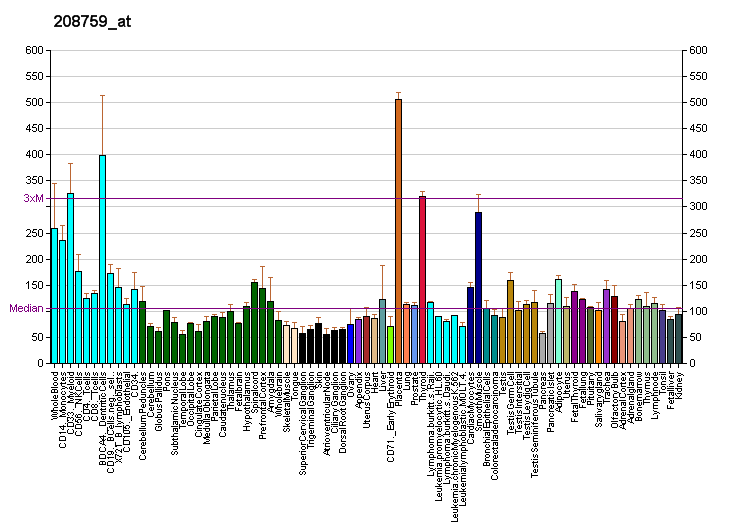
RNA expression pattern
Bgee	Human / Mouse (ortholog); Top expressed in: stromal cell of endometrium; monocyte; body of pancreas; granulocyte; rectum; islet of Langerhans; olfactory bulb; right lung; minor salivary glands; ventricular zone / Top expressed in: spermatocyte; lip; genital tubercle; granulocyte; tail of embryo; right kidney; ventricular zone; epithelium of small intestine; stroma of bone marrow; superior frontal gyrus; More reference expression data
BioGPS	More reference expression data
Gene ontology
Molecular function	peptidase activity; protein binding; endopeptidase activity
Cellular component	Golgi apparatus; membrane; focal adhesion; melanosome; plasma membrane; integral component of plasma membrane; lysosomal membrane; endoplasmic reticulum; extracellular exosome; integral component of membrane; azurophil granule membrane; gamma-secretase complex; cytoplasmic vesicle membrane; cytoplasmic vesicle; cytoplasm; mitochondrion; lysosome; early endosome; synaptic vesicle; endosome membrane; protein-containing complex; sarcolemma; synapse; synaptic membrane; integral component of presynaptic membrane
Biological process	Notch signaling pathway; ephrin receptor signaling pathway; myeloid cell homeostasis; protein processing; positive regulation of catalytic activity; amyloid-beta metabolic process; epithelial cell proliferation; proteolysis; T cell proliferation; membrane protein ectodomain proteolysis; membrane protein intracellular domain proteolysis; positive regulation of apoptotic process; Notch receptor processing; amyloid precursor protein catabolic process; amyloid-beta formation; amyloid precursor protein metabolic process; neutrophil degranulation; cerebellum development; Notch receptor processing, ligand-dependent; dopamine receptor signaling pathway; glutamate receptor signaling pathway; learning or memory; central nervous system myelination; adult behavior; amyloid precursor protein biosynthetic process; positive regulation of amyloid precursor protein biosynthetic process; neuron apoptotic process; neuron death; cellular response to calcium ion; regulation of long-term synaptic potentiation; short-term synaptic potentiation
Sources:Amigo / QuickGO
Orthologs
Databases	NCBI: entry; OMA: entry
Species	Human	Mouse
Entrez	23385	59287
Ensembl	ENSG00000162736	ENSMUSG00000003458
UniProt	Q92542	P57716
RefSeq (mRNA)	NM_001290184; NM_001290186; NM_015331; NM_001349729	NM_021607
RefSeq (protein)	NP_001277113; NP_001277115; NP_056146; NP_001336658	NP_067620
Location (UCSC)	Chr 1: 160.34 – 160.36 Mb	Chr 1: 171.89 – 171.91 Mb
PubMed search
- Wikidata
View/Edit Human	View/Edit Mouse

Nicastrin, also known as NCSTN, is a protein that in humans is encoded by the NCSTN gene.

== Function ==
Nicastrin (abbreviated NCT) is a protein that is part of the gamma secretase protein complex, which is one of the proteases involved in processing amyloid precursor protein (APP) to the short Alzheimer's disease-associated peptide amyloid beta. The other proteins in the complex are PSEN1 (presenilin-1), which is the catalytically active component of the complex, APH-1 (anterior pharynx-defective 1), and PEN-2 (presenilin enhancer 2). Nicastrin itself is not catalytically active, but instead promotes the maturation and proper trafficking of the other proteins in the complex, all of which undergo significant post-translational modification before becoming active in the cell. Nicastrin has also been identified as a regulator of neprilysin, an enzyme involved in the degradation of amyloid beta fragment.

== History ==
The protein was named after the Italian country Nicastro, reflecting the fact that Alzheimer's disease was described in 1963 after studying descendants of an extended family originating in the country of Nicastro that had familial Alzheimer's disease (FAD).

== Interactions ==
Nicastrin has been shown to interact with PSEN1 and PSEN2.
