= Notch proteins =

Protein family

Notch (LNR) domain
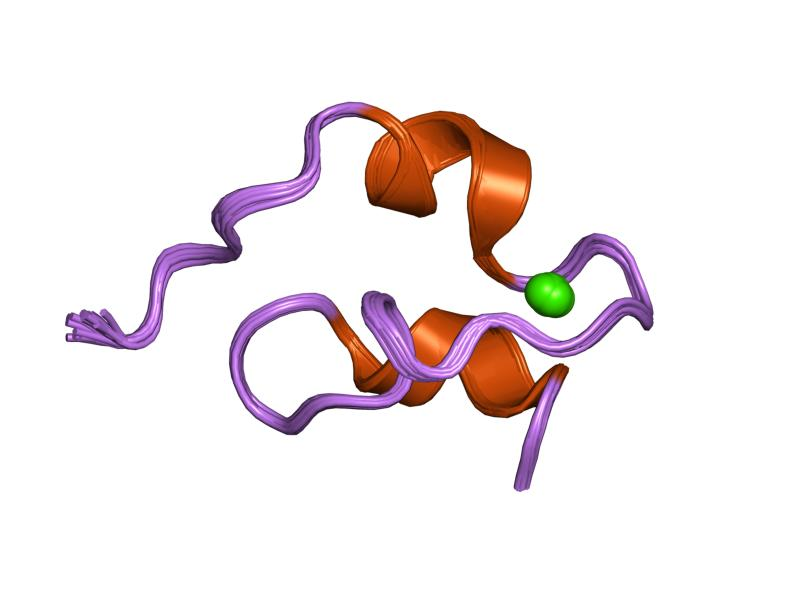
- Structure of a prototype LNR module from human Notch 1

Identifiers
- Symbol: Notch
- Pfam: PF00066
- InterPro: IPR000800
- SMART: SM00004
- PROSITE: PS50258
- OPM superfamily: 462
- OPM protein: 5kzo
- Membranome: 19
Available protein structures:
- PDB: IPR000800 PF00066 (ECOD; PDBsum)
- AlphaFold: IPR000800; PF00066

Notch proteins are a family of type 1 transmembrane proteins that form a core component of the Notch signaling pathway, which is highly conserved in animals. The Notch extracellular domain mediates interactions with DSL family ligands, allowing it to participate in juxtacrine signaling. The Notch intracellular domain acts as a transcriptional activator when in complex with CSL family transcription factors. Members of this type 1 transmembrane protein family share several core structures, including an extracellular domain consisting of multiple epidermal growth factor (EGF)-like repeats and an intracellular domain transcriptional activation domain (TAD). Notch family members operate in a variety of different tissues and play a role in a variety of developmental processes by controlling cell fate decisions. Much of what is known about Notch function comes from studies done in Caenorhabditis elegans (C. elegans) and Drosophila melanogaster. Human homologs have also been identified, but details of Notch function and interactions with its ligands are not well known in this context.

== Discovery ==
Notch was discovered in a mutant Drosophila in March 1913 in the lab of Thomas Hunt Morgan. This mutant emerged after several generations of crossing out and back-crossing beaded winged flies with wild type flies and was first characterized by John S. Dexter. The most frequently observed phenotype in Notch mutant flies is the appearance of a concave serration at the most distal end of the wings, for which the gene is named, accompanied by the absence of marginal bristles. This mutant was found to be a sex-linked dominant on the X chromosome that could only be observed in heterozygous females as it was lethal in males and homozygous females. The first Notch allele was established in 1917 by Charles William Metz and Calvin Bridges. In the late 1930s, studies of fly embryogenesis done by Donald F. Poulson provided the first indication of Notch's role in development. Notch mutant males exhibited a lack of the inner germ layers, the endoderm and mesoderm, that resulted in failure to undergo later morphogenesis embryonic lethality. Later studies in early Drosophila neurogenesis provided some of the first indications of Notch's roll in cell-cell signaling, as the nervous system in Notch mutants was developed by sacrificing hypodermal cells.

Starting in the 1980s researchers began to gain further insights into Notch function through genetic and molecular experiments. Genetic screens conducted in Drosophila led to the identification of several proteins that play a central role in Notch signaling, including Enhancer of split, Master mind, Delta, Suppressor of Hairless (CSL), and Serrate. At the same time, the Notch gene was successfully sequenced and cloned, providing insights into the molecular architecture of Notch proteins and led to identification of Notch homologs in Caenorhabditis elegans (C. elegans) and eventually in mammals.

In the early 1990s Notch was increasingly implicated as the receptor of a previously unknown intercellular signal pathway in which the Notch intercellular domain (NICD) is transported to the nucleus where it acts as a transcription factor to directly regulate target genes. The release of the NICD was found to be as a result of proteolytic cleavage of the transmembrane protein through the actions of the γ-secretase complex catalytic subunit Presenilin. This was a significant interaction as Presenilin is implicated in the development of Alzheimer's disease. This and further research into the mechanism of Notch signaling led to research that would further connect Notch to a wide range of human diseases.

== Structure ==
Drosophila contain a single Notch protein, C. elegans contain two redundant notch paralogs, Lin-12 and GLP-1, and humans have four Notch variants, Notch 1-4. Although variations exist between homologs, there are a set of highly conserved structures found in all Notch family proteins. The protein can broadly be split into the Notch extracellular domain (NECD) and Notch intracellular domain (NICD) joined together by a single-pass transmembrane domain (TM).

The NECD contains 36 EGF repeats in Drosophila, 28-36 in humans, and 13 and 10 in C. elegans Lin-12 and GLP-1 respectively. These repeats are heavily modified through O-glycoslyation and the addition of specific O-linked glycans has been shown to be necessary for proper function. The EGF repeats are followed by three cysteine-rich Lin-12/Notch Repeats (LNR) and a heterodimerization (HD) domain. Together the LNR and HD compose the negative regulatory region adjacent to the cell membrane and help prevent signaling in the absence of ligand binding.

NICD acts as a transcription factor that is released after ligand binding triggers its cleavage. It contains a nuclear localization sequence (NLS) that mediates its translocation to the nucleus, where it forms a transcriptional complex along with several other transcription factors. Once in the nucleus, several ankyrin repeats and the RAM domain interactions between the NICD and CSL proteins to form a transcriptional activation complex. In humans, an additional PEST domain plays a role in NICD degradation.

== Function ==
The Notch signaling pathway. Notch interacts with its ligands Delta or Serrate, leading to cleavage of the NICD which can then interact with Su(H) to form a transcriptional complex.

Notch family members play a role in a variety of developmental processes by controlling cell fate decisions. The Notch signaling network is an evolutionarily conserved intercellular signaling pathway that regulates interactions between physically adjacent cells. In Drosophila, notch interaction with its cell-bound ligands (delta, serrate) establishes an intercellular signaling pathway that plays a key role in development. This protein functions as a receptor for membrane bound ligands, and may play multiple roles during development. A deficiency can be associated with bicuspid aortic valve.

There is evidence that activated Notch 1 and Notch 3 promote differentiation of progenitor cells into astroglia. Notch 1, then activated before birth, induces radial glia differentiation, but postnatally induces the differentiation into astrocytes. One study shows that Notch-1 cascade is activated by Reelin in an unidentified way. Reelin and Notch1 cooperate in the development of the dentate gyrus, according to another.

== Ligand interactions ==
Jagged/Serrate protein

Identifiers
- Symbol: DSL
- Pfam: PF01414
- InterPro: IPR026219
- Membranome: 76
Available protein structures:
- PDB: IPR026219 PF01414 (ECOD; PDBsum)
- AlphaFold: IPR026219; PF01414

Notch signaling is triggered via direct cell-to-cell contact, mediated by interactions between the Notch receptor protein in the signal receiving cell and a ligand in an adjacent signal transmitting cell. These type 1 single-pass transmembrane proteins fall into the Delta/Serrate/Lag-2 (DSL) family of proteins which is named after the three canonical Notch ligands. Delta and Serrate are found in Drosophila while Lag-2 is found in C. elegans. Humans contain 3 Delta homologs, Delta-like 1, 3, and 4, as well as two Serrate homologs, Jagged 1 and 2. Notch proteins consist of a relatively short intracellular domain and a large extracellular domain with one or more EGF motifs and a N-terminal DSL-binding motif. EGF repeats 11-12 on the Notch extracellular domain have been shown to be necessary and sufficient for trans signaling interactions between Notch and its ligands. Additionally, EGF repeats 24-29 have been implicated in inhibition of cis interactions between Notch and ligands co-expressed in the same cell.

== Proteolysis ==
In order for a signaling event to occur, the Notch protein must be cleaved at several sites. In humans, Notch is first cleaved in the NRR domain by furin while being processed in the trans-Golgi network before being presented on the cell surface as a heterodimer. Drosophila Notch does not require this cleavage for signaling to occur, and there is some evidence that suggests that LIN-12 and GLP-1 are cleaved at this site in C. elegans.

Release of the NICD is achieved after an additional two cleavage events to Notch. Binding of Notch to a DSL ligand results in a conformational change that exposes a cleavage site in the NECD. Enzymatic proteolysis at this site is carried out by a A Disintegrin and Metalloprotease domain (ADAM) family protease. This protein is called Kuzbanian in Drosophila, sup-17 in C. elegans, and ADAM10 in humans. After proteolytic cleavage, the released NECD is endocytosed into the signal transmitting cell, leaving behind only a small extracellular portion of Notch. This truncated Notch protein can then be recognized by a γ-secretase that cleaves the third site found in the TM domain.

== Comparative evolutionary studies ==
Comparative genomic analyses of the Notch receptor family across mammals have begun to reveal how evolutionary conservation and lineage-specific variation contribute to receptor function and disease susceptibility. Large-scale studies of NOTCH3 across more than 100 mammalian species have identified a high degree of structural conservation, particularly within the extracellular EGF-like repeats that are critical for ligand binding and receptor stability. These analyses have also uncovered rare, naturally occurring species-specific variations, including alterations in conserved cysteine residues and regulatory regions, that appear to be tolerated in some mammals but are pathogenic in humans. Such findings suggest that evolutionary divergence within Notch receptors can illuminate structural constraints and functional thresholds that are not easily detected in single-species studies. Experimental introduction of naturally occurring mammalian variants into model systems has been proposed as a strategy to test bioinformatic predictions and to better understand how subtle changes in Notch receptor structure influence signaling, development, and disease.

== Human homologs ==
=== Notch-2 ===
Notch-2 (Neurogenic locus notch homolog protein 2) is a protein that in humans is encoded by the NOTCH2 gene.

NOTCH2 is associated with Alagille syndrome and Hajdu–Cheney syndrome.

== See also ==
- Notch signaling pathway
