= Beta-secretase =

Identifiers
- Symbol: BACE
- InterPro: IPR009119
- Membranome: 531
Available protein structures:
- PDB: IPR009119
- AlphaFold: IPR009119

Beta-secretase is a protein family that includes in humans Beta-secretase 1 and Beta-secretase 2.
