= Gamma secretase =

Type of protein

Gamma-secretase (Nicastrin subunit)
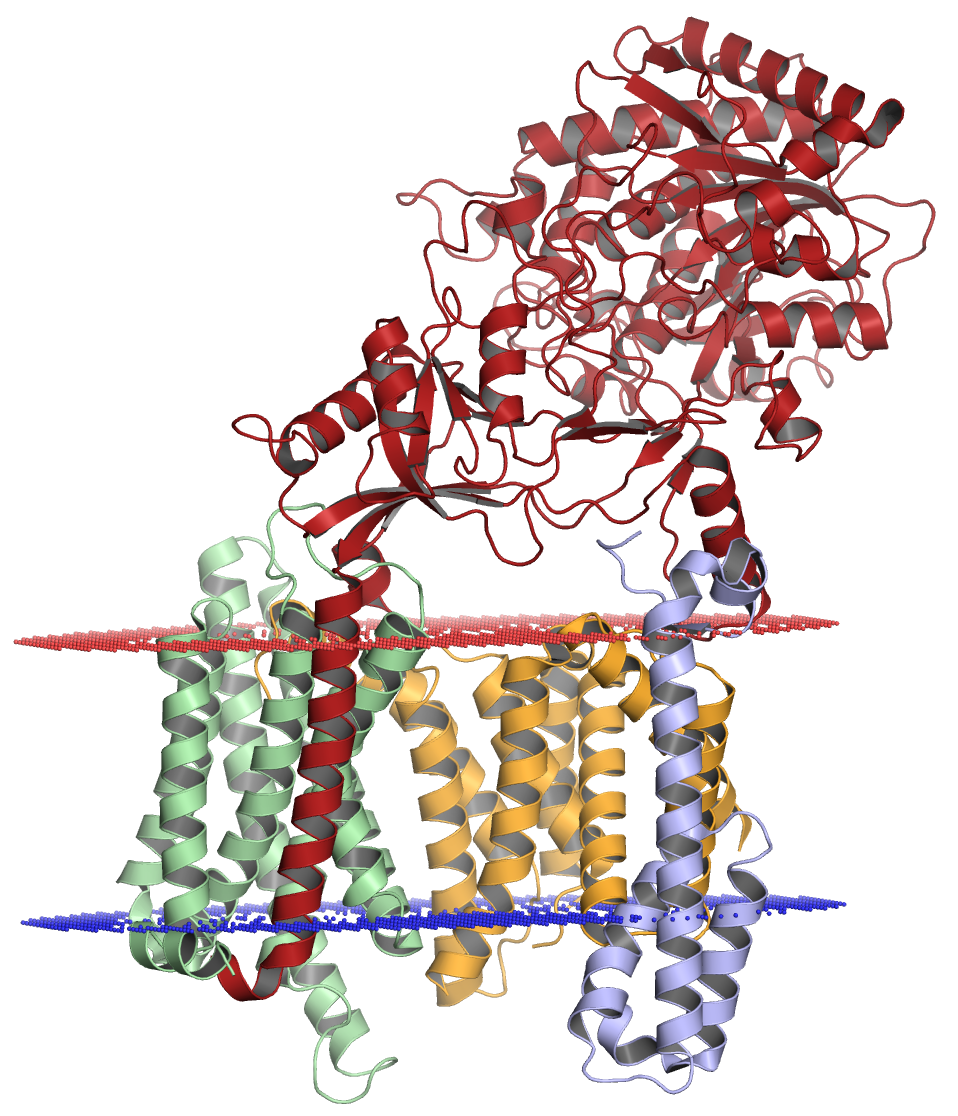
- The gamma secretase complex, with nicastrin (red), presenilin-1 (orange), PEN-2 (blue), and APH-1 (green); lumenal membrane shown in red and cytoplasmic membrane shown in blue. The structure was solved by cryo-electron microscopy.

Identifiers
- Symbol: Gamma-secretase, γ-secretase
- Pfam: PF05450
- InterPro: IPR008710
- OPM superfamily: 244
- OPM protein: [ 5fn5[
- Membranome: 155
Available protein structures:
- PDB: IPR008710 PF05450 (ECOD; PDBsum)
- AlphaFold: IPR008710; PF05450

Gamma secretase is a multi-subunit protease complex, an integral membrane protein, that cleaves single-pass transmembrane proteins at residues within the transmembrane domain. Proteases of this type are known as intramembrane proteases. The most well-known substrate of gamma secretase is amyloid precursor protein, a large integral membrane protein that, when cleaved by both gamma and beta secretase, produces a short 37-43 amino acid peptide called amyloid beta whose abnormally folded fibrillar form is the primary component of amyloid plaques found in the brains of Alzheimer's disease patients. Gamma secretase is also critical in the related processing of several other type I integral membrane proteins, such as Notch, ErbB4, E-cadherin, N-cadherin, ephrin-B2, or CD44.

== Subunits and assembly ==
The gamma secretase complex consists of four individual proteins: PSEN1 (presenilin-1), nicastrin, APH-1 (anterior pharynx-defective 1), and PEN-2 (presenilin enhancer 2). Recent evidence suggests that a fifth protein, known as CD147, is a non-essential regulator of the complex whose absence increases activity. Presenilin, an aspartyl protease, is the catalytic subunit; mutations in the presenilin gene a major genetic risk factor for Alzheimer's disease and modulates immune cell activity. In humans, two forms of presenilin and two forms of APH-1 have been identified in the genome; one of the APH homologs can also be expressed in two isoforms via alternative splicing, leading to at least six different possible gamma secretase complexes that may have tissue- or cell type specificity.

The proteins in the gamma secretase complex are heavily modified by proteolysis during assembly and maturation of the complex; a required activation step is in the autocatalytic cleavage of presenilin to N- and C-terminal fragments. Nicastrin's primary role is in maintaining the stability of the assembled complex and regulating intracellular protein trafficking. PEN-2 associates with the complex via binding of a transmembrane domain of presenilin and, among other possible roles, helps to stabilize the complex after presenilin proteolysis has generated the activated N-terminal and C-terminal fragments. APH-1, which is required for proteolytic activity, binds to the complex via a conserved alpha helix interaction motif and aids in initiating assembly of premature components.

Recent research has shown that the interaction of the gamma secretase complex with the γ-secretase activating protein facilitates the gamma cleavage of amyloid precursor protein into β-amyloid.

== Cellular trafficking ==
The gamma secretase complex is thought to assemble and mature via proteolysis in the early endoplasmic reticulum. The complexes are then transported to the late ER where they interact with and cleave their substrate proteins. Gamma secretase complexes have also been observed localized to the mitochondria, where they may play a role in promoting apoptosis.

== Function ==
Gamma secretase is an internal protease that cleaves within the membrane-spanning domain of its substrate proteins, including amyloid precursor protein (APP) and Notch. Substrate recognition occurs via nicastrin ectodomain binding to the N-terminus of the target, which is then passed via a poorly understood process between the two presenilin fragments to a water-containing active site where the catalytic aspartate residue is located. The active site must contain water to carry out hydrolysis within a hydrophobic environment in the interior of the cell membrane, although it is not well understood how water and proton exchange is effected, and as yet no X-ray crystallography structure of gamma secretase is available. Low-resolution electron microscopy reconstructions have allowed the visualization of the hypothesized internal pores of about 2 nanometres. In 2014, a three-dimensional structure of an intact human gamma-secretase complex was determined by cryo-electron microscopy single-particle analysis at 4.5 angstrom resolution and in 2015 an atomic-resolution (3.4 angstrom) cryo-EM structure was reported.

The gamma secretase complex is unusual among proteases in having a "sloppy" cleavage site at the C-terminal site in amyloid beta generation; gamma secretase can cleave APP in any of multiple sites to generate a peptide of variable length, most typically from 39 to 42 amino acids long, with Aβ40 the most common isoform and Aβ42 the most susceptible to conformational changes leading to amyloid fibrillogenesis. Certain mutations in both APP and both types of human presenilin are associated with increased Aβ42 production and the early-onset genetic form of familial Alzheimer's disease. Although older data suggested that different forms of the gamma secretase complex could be differentially responsible for generating different amyloid beta isoforms, current evidence indicates that the C-terminus of amyloid beta is produced by a series of single-residue cleavages by the same gamma secretase complex. Earlier cleavage sites produce peptides of length 46 (zeta-cleavage) and 49 (epsilon-cleavage).

== See also ==
- DAPT (chemical), a γ-secretase inhibitor
- Nirogacestat, a γ-secretase inhibitor
- Nivegacetor, a γ-secretase inhibitor
- Semagacestat, a γ-secretase inhibitor
