= Donald Price =

Donald or Don Price may refer to:

- Donald L. Price (1935–2023), American neuropathologist
- Donald D. Price (1942–2016), American neuroscientist and psychologist
- Don K. Price (1910–1995), American political scientist
- Don Price (rugby) (born 1956), Australian rugby league and rugby union player
