= Biochemistry of Alzheimer's disease =

The biochemistry of Alzheimer's disease, the most common cause of dementia, is not yet very well understood. Alzheimer's disease (AD) has been identified as a proteopathy: a protein misfolding disease due to the accumulation of abnormally folded amyloid beta (Aβ) protein in the brain. Amyloid beta is a short peptide that is an abnormal proteolytic byproduct of the transmembrane protein amyloid-beta precursor protein (APP), whose function is unclear but thought to be involved in neuronal development. The presenilins are components of proteolytic complex involved in APP processing and degradation.

Amyloid beta monomers are soluble and contain short regions of beta sheet and polyproline II helix secondary structures in solution, though they are largely alpha helical in membranes; however, at sufficiently high concentration, they undergo a dramatic conformational change to form a beta sheet–rich tertiary structure that aggregates to form amyloid fibrils. These fibrils and oligomeric forms of Aβ deposit outside neurons in formations known as senile plaques. There are different types of plaques, including the diffuse, compact, cored or neuritic plaque types, as well as Aβ deposits in the walls of small blood vessel walls in the brain called cerebral amyloid angiopathy.

AD is also considered a tauopathy due to abnormal aggregation of the tau protein, a microtubule-associated protein expressed in neurons that normally acts to stabilize microtubules in the cell cytoskeleton. Like most microtubule-associated proteins, tau is normally regulated by phosphorylation; however, in Alzheimer's disease, hyperphosphorylated tau accumulates as paired helical filaments that in turn aggregate into masses inside nerve cell bodies known as neurofibrillary tangles and as dystrophic neurites associated with amyloid plaques. Although little is known about the process of filament assembly, depletion of a prolyl isomerase protein in the parvulin family has been shown to accelerate the accumulation of abnormal tau.

Neuroinflammation is also involved in the complex cascade leading to AD pathology and symptoms. Considerable pathological and clinical evidence documents immunological changes associated with AD, including increased pro-inflammatory cytokine concentrations in the blood and cerebrospinal fluid. Whether these changes may be a cause or consequence of AD remains to be fully understood, but inflammation within the brain, including increased reactivity of the resident microglia towards amyloid deposits, has been implicated in the pathogenesis and progression of AD. Much of the known biochemistry of Alzheimer's disease has been deciphered through research using experimental models of Alzheimer's disease.

== Neuropathology ==
At a macroscopic level, AD is characterized by loss of neurons and synapses in the cerebral cortex and certain subcortical regions. This results in gross atrophy of the affected regions, including degeneration in the temporal lobe and parietal lobe, and parts of the frontal cortex and cingulate gyrus.

Both amyloid plaques and neurofibrillary tangles are clearly visible by microscopy in AD brains. Plaques are dense, mostly insoluble deposits of protein and cellular material outside and around neurons. Tangles are insoluble twisted fibers that build up inside the nerve cell. Though many older people develop some plaques and tangles, the brains of AD patients have them to a much greater extent and in different brain locations.

== Biochemical characteristics ==
Fundamental to the understanding of Alzheimer's disease is the biochemical events that leads to accumulation of the amyloid-beta plaques and tau-protein tangles. A delicate balance of the enzymes secretases regulate the amyloid-beta accumulation. Recently, a link between cholinergic neuronal activity and the activity of alpha-secretase has been highlighted, which can discourage amyloid-beta proteins deposition in brain of patients with Alzheimer's disease. Alzheimer's disease has been identified as a protein misfolding disease, or proteopathy, due to the accumulation of abnormally folded amyloid-beta proteins in the brains of AD patients. Abnormal amyloid-beta accumulation can first be detected using cerebrospinal fluid analysis and later using positron emission tomography (PET).

Although AD shares pathophysiological mechanisms with prion diseases, it is not transmissible in the wild, as prion diseases are. Any transmissibility that it may have is limited solely to extremely rare iatrogenic events from donor-derived therapies that are no longer used. Amyloid-beta, also written Aβ, is a short peptide that is a proteolytic byproduct of the transmembrane protein amyloid precursor protein (APP), whose function is unclear but thought to be involved in neuronal development. The presenilins are components of a proteolytic complex involved in APP processing and degradation. Although amyloid beta monomers are harmless, they undergo a dramatic conformational change at sufficiently high concentration to form a beta sheet-rich tertiary structure that aggregates to form amyloid fibrils that deposit outside neurons in dense formations known as senile plaques or neuritic plaques, in less dense aggregates as diffuse plaques, and sometimes in the walls of small blood vessels in the brain in a process called amyloid angiopathy or congophilic angiopathy.

AD is also considered a tauopathy due to abnormal aggregation of the tau protein, a microtubule-associated protein expressed in neurons that normally acts to stabilize microtubules in the cell cytoskeleton. Like most microtubule-associated proteins, tau is normally regulated by phosphorylation; however, in AD patients, hyperphosphorylated tau accumulates as paired helical filaments that in turn aggregate into masses inside nerve cell bodies known as neurofibrillary tangles and as dystrophic neurites associated with amyloid plaques.

Levels of the neurotransmitter acetylcholine (ACh) are reduced. Levels of other neurotransmitters serotonin, norepinephrine, and somatostatin are also often reduced. Replenishing the ACh by anti-cholinesterases is an approved mode of treatment by FDA. An alternative method of stimulating ACh receptors of M1-M3 types by synthetic agonists that have a slower rate of dissociation from the receptor has been proposed as next generation cholinomimetic in Alzheimer's disease.

== Disease mechanisms ==
While the gross histological features of AD in the brain have been well characterized, several different hypotheses have been advanced regarding the primary cause. Among the oldest hypotheses is the cholinergic hypothesis, which suggests that deficiency in cholinergic signaling initiates the progression of the disease. Current theories establish that both misfolding tau protein inside the cell and aggregation of amyloid beta outside the cell initiates the cascade leading to AD pathology. Newer potential hypotheses propose metabolic factors, vascular disturbance, lipid invasion and chronically elevated inflammation in the brain as contributing factors to AD. The amyloid beta hypothesis of molecular initiation have become dominant among many researchers to date. The amyloid and tau hypothesis are the most widely accepted.

=== Tau hypothesis ===
The hypothesis that tau is the primary causative factor has long been grounded in the observation that deposition of amyloid plaques does not correlate well with neuron loss. A mechanism for neurotoxicity has been proposed based on the loss of microtubule-stabilizing tau protein that leads to the degradation of the cytoskeleton. However, consensus has not been reached on whether tau hyperphosphorylation precedes or is caused by the formation of the abnormal helical filament aggregates. Support for the tau hypothesis also derives from the existence of other diseases known as tauopathies in which the same protein is identifiably misfolded. However, a majority of researchers support the alternative hypothesis that amyloid is the primary causative agent.

=== Amyloid hypothesis ===
The amyloid hypothesis was proposed because the gene for the amyloid beta precursor APP is located on chromosome 21, and patients with trisomy 21 – better known as Down syndrome – who have an extra gene copy exhibit AD-like disorders by 40 years of age. The amyloid hypothesis points to the cytotoxicity of mature aggregated amyloid fibrils, which are believed to be the toxic form of the protein responsible for disrupting the cell's calcium ion homeostasis and thus inducing apoptosis. This hypothesis is supported by the observation that higher levels of a variant of the beta amyloid protein known to form fibrils faster in vitro correlate with earlier onset and greater cognitive impairment in mouse models and with AD diagnosis in humans. However, mechanisms for the induced calcium influx, or proposals for alternative cytotoxic mechanisms, by mature fibrils are not obvious.

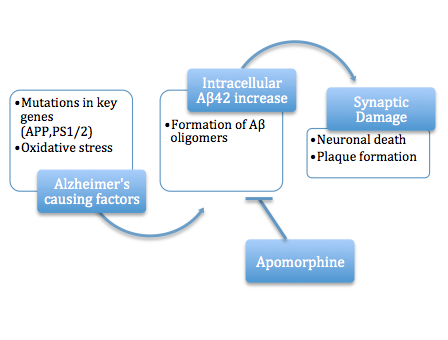
Flow chart depicting the role of apomorphine in Alzheimer's disease

A more recent variation of the amyloid hypothesis identifies the cytotoxic species as an intermediate misfolded form of amyloid beta, neither a soluble monomer nor a mature aggregated polymer but an oligomeric species, possibly toroidal or star-shaped with a central channel that may induce apoptosis by physically piercing the cell membrane. This ion channel hypothesis postulates that oligomers of soluble, non-fibrillar Aβ form membrane ion channels allowing unregulated calcium influx into neurons. A related alternative suggests that a globular oligomer localized to dendritic processes and axons in neurons is the cytotoxic species. The prefibrillar aggregates were shown to be able to disrupt the membrane.

The cytotoxic-fibril hypothesis presents a clear target for drug development: inhibit the fibrillization process. Much early development work on lead compounds has focused on this inhibition; most are also reported to reduce neurotoxicity, but the toxic-oligomer theory would imply that prevention of oligomeric assembly is the more important process or that a better target lies upstream, for example in the inhibition of APP processing to amyloid beta. For example, apomorphine was seen to significantly improve memory function through the increased successful completion of the Morris Water Maze.

Soluble intracellular (o)Aβ42

Two papers have shown that oligomeric (o)Aβ42 (a species of Aβ), in soluble intracellular form, acutely inhibits synaptic transmission, a pathophysiology that characterizes AD (in its early stages), by activating casein kinase 2.

=== Inflammatory hypothesis ===
Converging evidence suggests that a sustained inflammatory response in the brain is a core modifying feature of AD pathology and may be a key modifying factor in AD pathogenesis. The brains of AD patients exhibit several markers of increased inflammatory signaling. The inflammatory hypothesis proposes that chronically elevated inflammation in the brain is a crucial component to the amyloid cascade in the early phases of AD and magnifies disease severity in later stages of AD. Aβ is present in healthy brains and serves a vital physiological function in recovery from neuronal injury, protection from infection, and repair of the blood-brain barrier, however it is unknown how Aβ production starts to exceed the clearance capacity of the brain and initiates AD progression. A possible explanation is that Aβ causes microglia, the resident immune cell of the brain, to become activated and secrete pro-inflammatory signaling molecules, called cytokines, which recruit other local microglia. While acute microglial activation, as in response to injury, is beneficial and allows microglia to clear Aβ and other cellular debris via phagocytosis, chronically activated microglia exhibit decreased efficiency in Aβ clearance. Despite this reduced AB clearance capacity, activated microglia continue to secrete pro-inflammatory cytokines like interleukins 1β and 6 (IL-6, IL-1β) and tumor necrosis factor-alpha (TNF-a), as well as reactive oxygen species which disrupt healthy synaptic functioning and eventually cause neuronal death. The loss of synaptic functioning and later neuronal death is responsible for the cognitive impairments and loss of volume in key brain regions which are associated with AD. IL-1B, IL-6, and TNF-a cause further production of Aβ oligomers, as well as tau hyperphosphorylation, leading to continued microglia activation and creating a feed forward mechanism in which Aβ production is increased and Aβ clearance is decreased eventually causing the formation of Aβ plaques.

=== Historical cholinergic hypothesis ===
The cholinergic hypothesis of AD development was first proposed in 1976 by Peter Davies and A.J.F Maloney. It claimed that Alzheimer's begins as a deficiency in the production of acetylcholine, a vital neurotransmitter. Much early therapeutic research was based on this hypothesis, including restoration of the "cholinergic nuclei". The possibility of cell-replacement therapy was investigated on the basis of this hypothesis. All of the first-generation anti-Alzheimer's medications are based on this hypothesis and work to preserve acetylcholine by inhibiting acetylcholinesterases (enzymes that break down acetylcholine). These medications, though sometimes beneficial, have not led to a cure. In all cases, they have served to only treat symptoms of the disease and have neither halted nor reversed it. These results and other research have led to the conclusion that acetylcholine deficiencies may not be directly causal, but are a result of widespread brain tissue damage, damage so widespread that cell-replacement therapies are likely to be impractical.

More recent findings center on the effects of the misfolded and aggregated proteins, amyloid beta and tau: tau protein abnormalities may initiate the disease cascade, then beta amyloid deposits progress the disease.

=== Glucose consumption ===
The human brain is one of the most metabolically active organs in the body and metabolizes a large amount of glucose to produce cellular energy in the form of adenosine triphosphate (ATP). Despite its high energy demands, the brain is relatively inflexible in its ability to utilize substrates for energy production and relies almost entirely on circulating glucose for its energy needs. This dependence on glucose puts the brain at risk if the supply of glucose is interrupted, or if its ability to metabolize glucose becomes defective. If the brain is not able to produce ATP, synapses cannot be maintained and cells cannot function, ultimately leading to impaired cognition.

Imaging studies have shown decreased utilization of glucose in the brains of Alzheimer's disease patients early in the disease, before clinical signs of cognitive impairment occur. This decrease in glucose metabolism worsens as clinical symptoms develop and the disease progresses. Studies have found a 17–24% decline in cerebral glucose metabolism in patients with Alzheimer's disease, compared with age-matched controls. Numerous imaging studies have since confirmed this observation.

Abnormally low rates of cerebral glucose metabolism are found in a characteristic pattern in the Alzheimer's disease brain, particularly in the posterior cingulate, parietal, temporal, and prefrontal cortices. These brain regions are believed to control multiple aspects of memory and cognition. This metabolic pattern is reproducible and has even been proposed as a diagnostic tool for Alzheimer's disease. Moreover, diminished cerebral glucose metabolism (DCGM) correlates with plaque density and cognitive deficits in patients with more advanced disease.

Diminished cerebral glucose metabolism (DCGM) may not be solely an artifact of brain cell loss since it occurs in asymptomatic patients at risk for Alzheimer's disease, such as patients homozygous for the epsilon 4 variant of the apolipoprotein E gene (APOE4, a genetic risk factor for Alzheimer's disease), as well as in inherited forms of Alzheimer's disease. Given that DCGM occurs before other clinical and pathological changes occur, it is unlikely to be due to the gross cell loss observed in Alzheimer's disease.

In imaging studies involving young adult APOE4 carriers, where there were no signs of cognitive impairment, diminished cerebral glucose metabolism (DCGM) was detected in the same areas of the brain as older subjects with Alzheimer's disease. However, DCGM is not exclusive to APOE4 carriers. By the time Alzheimer's has been diagnosed, DCGM occurs in genotypes APOE3/E4, APOE3/E3, and APOE4/E4. Thus, DCGM is a metabolic biomarker for the disease state.

=== Insulin signaling ===
A connection has been established between Alzheimer's disease and diabetes during the past decade, as insulin resistance, which is a characteristic hallmark of diabetes, has also been observed in brains of subjects with Alzheimer's disease. Neurotoxic oligomeric amyloid-β species decrease the expression of insulin receptors on the neuronal cell surface and abolish neuronal insulin signaling. It has been suggested that neuronal gangliosides, which take part in the formation of membrane lipid microdomains, facilitate amyloid-β-induced removal of the insulin receptors from the neuronal surface. In Alzheimer's disease, oligomeric amyloid-β species trigger TNF-α signaling. c-Jun N-terminal kinase activation by TNF-α in turn activates stress-related kinases and results in IRS-1 serine phosphorylation, which subsequently blocks downstream insulin signaling. The resulting insulin resistance contributes to cognitive impairment. Consequently, increasing neuronal insulin sensitivity and signaling may constitute a novel therapeutic approach to treat Alzheimer's disease.

=== Oxidative stress ===
Oxidative stress is emerging as a key factor in the pathogenesis of AD. Reactive oxygen species (ROS) over-production is thought to play a critical role in the accumulation and deposition of amyloid beta in AD. Brains of AD patients have elevated levels of oxidative DNA damage in both nuclear and mitochondrial DNA, but the mitochondrial DNA has approximately 10-fold higher levels than nuclear DNA. Aged mitochondria may be the critical factor in the origin of neurodegeneration in AD. Even individuals with mild cognitive impairment, the phase between normal aging and early dementia, have increased oxidative damage in their nuclear and mitochondrial brain DNA (see Aging brain). Naturally occurring DNA double-strand breaks (DSBs) arise in human cells largely from single-strand breaks induced by various processes including the activity of reactive oxygen species, topoisomerases, and hydrolysis due to thermal fluctuations. In neurons DSBs are induced by a type II topoisomerase as part of the physiologic process of memory formation. DSBs are present in both neurons and astrocytes in the postmortem human hippocampus of AD patients at a higher level than in non-AD individuals. AD is associated with an accumulation of DSBs in neurons and astrocytes in the hippocampus and frontal cortex from early stages onward. DSBs are increased in the vicinity of amyloid plaques in the hippocampus, indicating a potential role for Aβ in DSB accumulation or vice versa. The predominant mechanism for repairing DNA double-strand breaks is non-homologous end joining (NHEJ), a mechanism that utilizes the DNA-dependent protein kinase (DNA-PK) complex. The end joining activity and protein levels of DNA-PK catalytic subunit are significantly lower in AD brains than in normal brains.

=== Cholesterol hypothesis ===
The cholesterol hypothesis is a combination of the amyloid hypothesis, tau hypothesis, and potentially the inflammatory hypothesis. Cholesterol was shown to be upstream of both amyloid and tau production. The cholesterol is produced in the astrocytes and shipped to neurons where it activates amyloid production through a process called substrate presentation. The process required apoE. Cholesterol's regulation of Tau production is less well understood, but knocking out the cholesterol synthesis enzyme SREBP2 decreased Tau phosphorylation. Innate immunity triggers cholesterol synthesis and cells take up the cholesterol. Presumably a cell in the brain dies with old age and this triggers innate immunity. More studies are needed to directly tie the inflammatory hypothesis to cholesterol synthesis in the brain.

=== Lipid invasion hypothesis ===
The Lipid Invasion Model (LIM) is a hypothesis for AD published in 2022, which argues that AD is a result of external lipid invasion to the brain, following damage to the blood-brain barrier (BBB). The LIM provides a comprehensive explanation of the observed neuropathologies associated with the disease, including the lipid irregularities first described by Alois Alzheimer himself, and accounts for the wide range of risk factors now identified with AD (including old age, ApoE4, Aβ, brain trauma, high blood pressure, smoking, type 2 diabetes, obesity, alcohol, stress and sleep deprivation), most of which are also associated with damage to the BBB.

The LIM can be viewed as a development of the cholesterol hypothesis, and incorporates and extends the amyloid hypothesis, the current dominant explanation of the disease. It goes back a step to argue that the cause of the amyloid plaques, neurofibrillary/tau tangles and many other features of the disease is the invasion of low-density lipoprotein (LDL) and other forms of 'bad cholesterol' along with free fatty acids (FFAs) into the brain, following breakdown of the BBB. Such lipids would normally be excluded from the brain by the BBB.

The LIM argues that the influx of 'bad cholesterol' is the primary cause of the excess Aβ, plaque formation and neurofibrillary/tau tangles in Late Onset AD (LOAD), due to changes in lipid raft composition and endosomal-lysosomal trafficking. This concurs with a large body of evidence showing an association of excess cholesterol with increased Aβ production, amyloid plaques and neurofibrillary/tau tangles.

Plaques and tangles are thought to contribute to memory loss in AD. However, not all AD brains display plaques or tangles, and plaques and tangles do not always lead to AD. Therefore, the LIM proposes that it is the FFAs, rather than cholesterol-driven Aβ, that could be the primary drivers of AD. FFAs can account for all the common features of AD, including amnesia, synaptic disruption, neuroinflammation, brain shrinkage, body clock disruption, changes in brain energy production from glucose to ketone bodies, mitochondrial toxicity and oxidative stress within neurons. The LIM argues that the impact of the FFAs could cause most of the memory loss in AD, in addition to the spatial confusion, sleep disruption and sometimes paranoia also associated with the disease.

The Lipid Invasion Model is the only model of AD that explains both the plaques and neurofibrillary/tau tangles commonly seen in LOAD (which accounts for 95% of AD cases), as well as all the other standard features of AD. It also explains why AD so disproportionally affects older people, and the high instance in contact sports players. By arguing that the root cause of AD is primarily damage to the BBB and the subsequent invasion of harmful lipids, the model offers new insights into the fundamental causes of AD, and potential new pathways for remedies for the disease. The LIM may also provide insights into other dementias and neurological diseases, such as Parkinson's and ALS/Motor Neurone Disease.

=== Reelin hypothesis ===
A 1994 study showed that the isoprenoid changes in Alzheimer's disease differ from those occurring during normal aging and that this disease cannot, therefore, be regarded as a result of premature aging. During aging the human brain shows a progressive increase in levels of dolichol, a reduction in levels of ubiquinone, but relatively unchanged concentrations of cholesterol and dolichyl phosphate. In Alzheimer's disease, the situation is reversed with decreased levels of dolichol and increased levels of ubiquinone. The concentrations of dolichyl phosphate are also increased, while cholesterol remains unchanged. The increase in the sugar carrier dolichyl phosphate may reflect an increased rate of glycosylation in the diseased brain and the increase in the endogenous anti-oxidant ubiquinone an attempt to protect the brain from oxidative stress, for instance induced by lipid peroxidation. Ropren, identified previously in Russia, is neuroprotective in a rat model of Alzheimer's disease.

A relatively recent hypothesis based mainly on rodent experiments links the onset of Alzheimer's disease to the hypofunction of the large extracellular protein reelin. A decrease of reelin in the human entorhinal cortex where the disease typically initiates is evident while compensatory increase of reelin levels in other brain structures of the patients is also reported. Of key importance, overexpression of reelin rescues the cognitive capacities of Alzheimer's disease model mice and τ-protein overexpressing mice. A recent circuit level model proposed a mechanism of how reelin depletion leads to the early deterioration of episodic memory thereby laying the theoretical foundation of the reelin hypothesis.

=== Large gene instability hypothesis ===
A bioinformatics analysis in 2017 revealed that extremely large human genes are significantly over-expressed in brain and take part in the postsynaptic architecture. These genes are also highly enriched in cell adhesion Gene Ontology (GO) terms and often map to chromosomal fragile sites. The majority of known Alzheimer's disease risk gene products including the amyloid precursor protein (APP) and gamma-secretase, as well as the APOE receptors and GWAS risk loci take part in similar cell adhesion mechanisms. It was concluded that dysfunction of cell and synaptic adhesion is central to Alzheimer's disease pathogenesis, and mutational instability of large synaptic adhesion genes may be the etiological trigger of neurotransmission disruption and synaptic loss in brain aging. As a typical example, this hypothesis explains the APOE risk locus of AD in context of signaling of its giant lipoprotein receptor, LRP1b which is a large tumor-suppressor gene with brain-specific expression and also maps to an unstable chromosomal fragile site. The large gene instability hypothesis puts the DNA damage mechanism at the center of Alzheimer's disease pathophysiology.

== See also ==
- Cell cycle hypothesis of Alzheimer's disease
