= Cell cycle hypothesis of Alzheimer's disease =

Alzheimer's disease (AD) is a neurodegenerative condition characterized by two hallmarks: senile plaques and the neurofibrillary tangle. Senile plaques are extracellular aggregations of amyloid-b (Aβ) protein. Neurofibrillary tangles are collections of hyperphosphorylated tau protein associated with microtubules found within neurons. Senile plaques and neurofibrillary tangles are widespread throughout brain tissue and mirror other pathological changes associated with AD.

== Alzheimer's disease and the cell cycle ==
Neurons typically remain in G0, a nondividing, nonreplicating phase of the cell cycle. Neurons subject to loss of synaptic connections, chronic exposure to oxidative stress or stress hormones like glucocorticoids will exit G0 and reenter into a cell cycle that is abortive and leads to cell death through apoptosis.

The G0 to G1 transition in neurons is normally only observed for stressed neurons about to undergo apoptosis. Upon entering G1, these stressed neurons will be arrested at the G1 checkpoint by the absence of cyclin E1 and/or the inhibition of the cyclin-E1–CDK2 complex by p21, p27, and p53. Next, the absence of cyclin A1 commits the neuron to division, but the cell lacks the ability to re-differentiate. Since the cell is unable to complete the cell cycle, it dies via apoptosis (Meikrantz et al., 1995). In the past decade, research has shown that neuronal cell cycle reentry plays a fundamental role in the pathogenesis of AD. The cell cycle hypothesis of AD proposes that the disease is caused by aberrant re-entry of different neuronal populations into the cell division cycle, following a 2-hit hypothesis (Nagy et al. 1998).

The cell cycle hypothesis of AD also attempts to explain for the characteristic senile plaques and the neurofibrillary tangles of AD pathology. The intracellular accumulation of highly phosphorylated tau is linked to the cell cycle and cell cycle dependent kinases (McShea et al., 2007). Other aberrations in cell cycle dynamics influence cell senescence, oxidative stress, and misregulated apoptosis (Franco et al., 2006). In particular, it is clear that oxidative stress is a pervasive feature in AD at all stages (Zhu et al., 2005). Thus, the cell-cycle hypothesis of Alzheimer's disease considers AD as a disease of deregulation of the cell cycle in neurons.

== The 2-hit hypothesis of AD ==
The cell-cycle hypothesis of AD proposes a 2-hit hypothesis that results in neuron "immortality", and continual production of senile plaques and neurofibrillary tangles to cause AD.

1. Neurons are able to leave G0 quiescence and enter a permanent, steady-state G1 phase
2. Neurons lose the ability to undergo apoptosis.

=== Hit One: Abnormal G0 to G1 transition in AD neurons ===
Many subscribers to the 2-hit hypothesis of AD argue that the best strategy towards AD prevention appears to be the prevention of neurons from leaving G0 phase and entering the abnormal G1 associated with AD. They propose targeting upstream mitogenic pathways prior to the G0/G1 transition to prevent pre-AD neurons from more vulnerability to additional insults capable of triggering excessive Aβ and tau production in AD neurons.

==== Abnormal localization of G0/G1 transition markers ====
Cell cycle markers cyclin D, Cdk4, and Ki67 are found in elevated levels in AD neurons, signifying the transition to G1 (McShea et al. 1997; Zhu et al. 2007). These markers are normally found in the nucleus, where they are needed for expression of key genes that allow the diseased neuron to continue to G1, and eventually, apoptosis (Vincent et al. 1997). However, these markers are found in high levels in the cytoplasm of AD neurons rather than the nucleus, suggesting prevention of the normal apoptotic pathway.

==== Abnormal response to oxidative injury ====
Acute oxidative injury in most mature neurons will induce the neurons to enter G1 along an apoptotic pathway. However, in the AD brain, neurons do not show signs of apoptosis as would be expected under conditions of acute oxidative stress (Perry et al., 1998). Instead, it is proposed that after being subjected to oxidative injury, AD neurons possess genetic defects which allow them to enter and stay in G1 instead of proceeding towards apoptosis. This adaptive response produces an "oxidative steady state" in the AD neuron, characterized by relatively low intracellular concentrations of oxidants such as hydrogen peroxide which explains the reduced levels of neuronal apoptosis (Wiese et al. 1995). Persistent oxidative stress in pre-AD and AD cases may result in an irreversible oxidative steady state, in which neurons which have neurofibrillary tangles (NFT) can survive for decades (Morsch et al., 1999). AD NFT-bearing neurons have been shown to under or over-expression of over 225 genes which have protein products involved in oxidative stress (Dunckley et al., 2006). Chronic oxidative stress also inhibits the downstream propagation of caspase-mediated apoptotic signals, which is the second hit in the 2-hit hypothesis of AD (Hampton et al. 1998).

There is evidence that Aβ has antioxidant properties (Hayashi et al. 2007; Nakamura et al. 2007; Moreira et al. 2008). Therefore, oxidative damage and subsequent "stuck" AD neurons could be induced to activate a compensatory response involving activation of a- and g-secretases to produce more Aβ for neutralization of future free radicals (Tamagno et al. 2002, 2005; Kim and Shen 2008). Increased density of Aβ plaque deposition in the AD brain is associated with decreased levels of neuronal oxidative damage, suggesting a compensatory role of Aβ in response to oxidative injury (Pratico et al., 2001).

=== Hit Two: Lost apoptotic ability in AD neurons ===
Several studies presently indicate that apoptosis might occur in, and contribute to, AD onset and progression. Stimuli for apoptosis in AD include increased oxidative stress, dysregulation of ion homeostasis, growth factor deprivation, accumulation of Aβ, metabolic impairment, reduced clearance of toxin, mitochondrial dysfunction, DNA damage, protein aggregation.

Despite a growing number of studies underlying caspases and apoptosis involvement in AD, no direct role of apoptotic death in AD etiology has still been proven although the presence of apoptotic bodies, DNA fragmentation, granulated and marginated chromatin and shrunken and irregular cell shapes have been largely reported in tissue sections of brains from affected patients.

==== Reduced caspase activation ====
AD neurons which exit G0 and enter G1 do not activate the full set of caspases required for neuronal apoptosis (Raina et al. 2001). Instead, AD neurons have increased expression of upstream caspases 8 and 9 while keeping control levels of downstream caspases 3, 6, and 7 (Raina et al. 2001). This result suggests that AD neurons often result in "abortosis", the concept of apoptotic avoidance and neuronal survival. This "abortosis" may be due to AD neurons receiving apoptotic signals but failing to propagate these signals to downstream caspase effectors (Raina et al. 2000, 2001).

Staining of neurons from AD brain autopsy tissue shows that 5–10% of neurons are incompatible with a cell death process that is apoptosis-like, suggesting loss of apoptotic ability compared to control and resulting neurons being stuck in the cell cycle (Yang et al., 2003). The same study also detected hundreds of times the levels of these "stuck" neurons compared to a control, suggesting that these abnormal neurons have aggregated and built up over a period of several months up to one year. This aggregation of AD neurons exacerbates production of Aβ and hyperphosphorylated tau.

==== Liberation of E2F1 localization ====
Additionally, the E2F1 transcription factor in the AD brain is found primarily in the cytoplasm rather than its normal location in the nucleus. E2F1 normally regulates neuronal cell death induced by DNA damage, suggesting that the liberation of E2F1 from the nucleus exacerbates the loss of apoptosis in the AD brain (Scuitto et al. 2002).

== Proposed relationship between the cell-cycle hypothesis of AD and Aβ and Tau ==
There is some evidence that cell cycle re-entry depends upon tau hyper-phosphorylation. Studies using mouse models have shown that tau mislocalization to the cytoplasm induces abnormal cell cycle alterations. In particular, studies using a tauopathy mouse model confirmed that disease-causing tau mutations can cause cell cycle abnormalities in mammalians (Delobel et. a, 2006). Genetic studies in Drosophila models also demonstrate that tau defects cause neuronal cell cycle activation (Khurana et al., 2006).

There is also evidence of Aβ serving a function in cell cycle control (Zhu et al., 2004). AD may be an outcome of extreme compensatory adaptations in pre-AD neurons, which have Aβ mutations and extensive changes in expression of genes involved in neuronal outgrowth and energy metabolism and nucleotide and protein synthesis. Consequently, pre-AD neurons are more vulnerable to additional insults (Vercauteren et al. 2004). However, there is still controversy regarding the role of Aβ in the neuronal cell cycle, since a previous study with Aβ mutant mice did not detect any neuronal cell cycle abnormalities (Gartner et al., 2003).

== See also ==
- Biochemistry of Alzheimer's disease
