= Laurel Beckett =

American biostatistician

Laurel Alison Beckett (also published as Laurel A. Smith) is an American biostatistician specializing in Alzheimer's disease and other age-related causes of cognitive impairment. Beyond biostatistics, she has also worked as an activist for women in medicine, including the advocacy of flexible career options allowing women to balance medical careers with childrearing. She is retired as distinguished professor emerita from the UC Davis School of Medicine, where she was chief of biostatistics and directed the biostatistics core of the Alzheimer's Disease Neuroimaging Initiative.

== Education and career ==
Beckett is a 1968 graduate of Pomona College. She earned her Ph.D. in biostatistics in 1972 at Stanford University. Her dissertation, Statistical Procedures for Diagnosis Based on Binary Variables, was supervised by Byron Brown Jr.

She worked as a faculty member at the University of Illinois Urbana-Champaign, at Stony Brook University from 1976 to 1981, at Texas A&M University from 1981 to 1987, at the Harvard Medical School from 1987 to 1992, at Rush Medical College in Chicago from 1992 to 2000, and at the University of California, Davis from 2000 until her retirement in 2019.

== Recognition ==
Beckett was named a Fellow of the American Statistical Association in 2004, "for her major contributions to statistical methods for characterizing the distribution and determinants of chronic diseases and other notable achievements".
