= Cm28 =

Scorpion neurotoxin

Potassium channel toxin alpha-KTx 32.1

Identifiers
- Organism: Centruroides margaritatus
- Symbol: C0HM22
- Orthologs: OMA: entry
- UniProt: C0HM22
Search for
- Structures: Swiss-model
- Domains: InterPro

Cm28
Identifiers
3D model (JSmol)	Interactive image
- InChI: InChI=1S/C113H173N35O38S6/c1-52(2)86-107(180)134-65(37-79(117)154)90(163)123-40-82(157)127-60(20-11-13-31-115)93(166)140-74-49-189-187-46-71-92(165)125-42-84(159)129-67(39-81(119)156)99(172)146-88(55(6)152)109(182)137-70(45-151)110(183)147-33-16-23-78(147)106(179)136-69(44-150)100(173)142-73(48-191-192-51-76(143-108(181)87(53(3)4)145-103(74)176)111(184)148-34-15-22-77(148)105(178)126-54(5)112(185)186)102(175)133-64(36-57-24-26-58(153)27-25-57)96(169)132-63(35-56-17-8-7-9-18-56)97(170)135-68(43-149)91(164)124-41-83(158)128-66(38-80(118)155)98(171)141-75(104(177)144-86)50-190-188-47-72(138-89(162)59(116)19-10-12-30-114)101(174)130-61(21-14-32-122-113(120)121)94(167)131-62(95(168)139-71)28-29-85(160)161/h7-9,17-18,24-27,52-55,59-78,86-88,149-153H,10-16,19-23,28-51,114-116H2,1-6H3,(H2,117,154)(H2,118,155)(H2,119,156)(H,123,163)(H,124,164)(H,125,165)(H,126,178)(H,127,157)(H,128,158)(H,129,159)(H,130,174)(H,131,167)(H,132,169)(H,133,175)(H,134,180)(H,135,170)(H,136,179)(H,137,182)(H,138,162)(H,139,168)(H,140,166)(H,141,171)(H,142,173)(H,143,181)(H,144,177)(H,145,176)(H,146,172)(H,160,161)(H,185,186)(H4,120,121,122)/t54-,55+,59-,60-,61-,62-,63-,64-,65-,66-,67-,68-,69-,70-,71-,72-,73-,74-,75-,76-,77-,78-,86-,87-,88-/m0/s1 Key: IBVDFQSKVKPPKW-PQHKKVDPSA-N
- SMILES: N[C@@]([H])(CCCCN)C(=O)N[C@@]([H])(CS2)C(=O)N[C@@]([H])(CCCNC(=N)N)C(=O)N[C@@]([H])(CCC(=O)O)C(=O)N[C@@]([H])(CS3)C(=O)NCC(=O)N[C@@]([H])(CC(=O)N)C(=O)N[C@@]([H])([C@]([H])(O)C)C(=O)N[C@@]([H])(CO)C(=O)N1[C@@]([H])(CCC1)C(=O)N[C@@]([H])(CO)C(=O)N[C@@]([H])(CS4)C(=O)N[C@@]([H])(Cc1ccc(O)cc1)C(=O)N[C@@]([H])(Cc1ccccc1)C(=O)N[C@@]([H])(CO)C(=O)NCC(=O)N[C@@]([H])(CC(=O)N)C(=O)N[C@@]([H])(CS2)C(=O)N[C@@]([H])(C(C)C)C(=O)N[C@@]([H])(CC(=O)N)C(=O)NCC(=O)N[C@@]([H])(CCCCN)C(=O)N[C@@]([H])(CS3)C(=O)N[C@@]([H])(C(C)C)C(=O)N[C@@]([H])(CS4)C(=O)N1[C@@]([H])(CCC1)C(=O)N[C@@]([H])(C)C(=O)O

Properties
Chemical formula	C_{113}H_{173}N_{35}O_{38}S_{6}
Molar mass	2822.19 g·mol^{−1}

Related compounds
Related compounds	ε-KTx1.1, ε-KTx1.2
- Except where otherwise noted, data are given for materials in their standard state (at 25 °C [77 °F], 100 kPa). Infobox references

Cm28, a scorpion toxin from Centruroides margaritatus, selectively blocks voltage-gated potassium channels K_{V}1.2 and K_{V}1.3 with high affinity. It also suppresses the activation of human CD4^{+} effector memory T cells, suggesting its potential as a therapeutic agent for autoimmune diseases. Phylogenetic analysis reveals that Cm28 belongs to a new α-KTx subfamily, highlighting its unique structural and functional properties for potential drug development.

== Etymology ==
The peptide name "Cm28" is derived from the scorpion species Centruroides margaritatus and its molecular mass, which is estimated to be 2820 Daltons.

== Sources ==
Cm28 was isolated from the venom of the Centruroides margaritatus scorpion. The venom was isolated through milking the animal by electric stimulation.

== Chemistry ==
=== Structure ===
Cm28 is a short peptide from the α-KTx subfamily composed of 27 amino acid residues with six cysteines forming three disulfide bridges, which is a specific quality of the proteins from the mentioned family. Both defensins and venom toxins, like Cm28, share a structural similarity. Both are cysteine-rich proteins with multiple disulfide bonds that help maintain their shape. This structural feature, often referred to as the CSα/β fold, is characterized by alternating alpha-helices and beta-sheets stabilized by disulfide bridges. This fold is essential for their ability to interact with and block ion channels, a function crucial for both immune defense (defensins) and venom toxicity (neurotoxins).

=== Amino acid sequence ===
KCRECGNTSPSCYFSGNCVNGKCVCPA

=== Family ===
Phylogenetic analysis comparing the amino acid sequence of Cm28 with 75 other reported scorpion toxins suggests that Cm28 belongs to the α-KTx family. It has been given the systematic number α-KTx 32.1. Cm28 lacks the typical lysine-tyrosine functional dyad required for blocking K_{V} channels.

The 3D model can be found on Swissmodel.

== Target and mode of action ==
Cm28 is a potent inhibitor of voltage-gated potassium channels K_{V}1.2 and K_{V}1.3, with dissociation constants (Kd) of 0.96 nM and 1.3 nM, respectively. K_{V}1.3 channels are essential for the activation and proliferation of TH17 cells, a T helper cell subset critical for immune responses, especially in autoimmune diseases. These channels regulate T cell proliferation and other signaling pathways necessary for T cell functioning. The binding of Cm28 to both K_{V}1.2 and K_{V}1.3 is reversible, allowing dynamic regulation of channel activity during immune responses.

It operates by physically blocking the pores of these channels, preventing potassium ions from passing through. Rather than altering the voltage-sensing domain, Cm28 interacts with the selectivity filter region, effectively disrupting ion flow without shifting the activation thresholds. This specific interaction highlights Cm28's precise targeting of the pore region, making it a highly selective blocker for K_{V}1.2 and K_{V}1.3 channels. The exact residues involved in selectivity filter block are unknown.

== Toxicity ==
In toxicity assays, Cm28 did not compromise the viability of human CD4^{+} T cells, even at concentrations much higher than its binding affinity to K_{V}1.3 channels. Specifically, after a 24-hour incubation period with 1.5 μM Cm28, the cytotoxicity of the peptide on quiescent and TCR-activated CD4^{+} T cells was less than 1%. This finding was confirmed by both lactate dehydrogenase (LDH) assays and flow cytometry using Zombie NIR dye to evaluate cell viability. Therefore, Cm28 demonstrates minimal cytotoxicity in vitro under the experimental conditions.
