= Lary Walker =

American neuroscientist

Lary Craswell Walker
- Born: Columbus, Ohio, United States
- Education: Louisiana State University (BS); Tulane University (MS, PhD)
- Known for: Prion-like mechanisms in neurodegenerative diseases Neuropathology of Alzheimer's disease Proteopathy
- Awards: Metlife Foundation Award for Medical Research in Alzheimer's Disease (2014); Alexander von Humboldt Research Award (2016); Peter Bassoe Lectureship of the American Neuropsychiatric Association (2017)
- Scientific career
- Fields: Neuroscience; Neuropathology; Neurology
- Workplaces: Tulane University; Emory University; Johns Hopkins University; University of Greifswald; Parke-Davis/Warner-Lambert; University of Tübingen

Lary Walker is an American neuroscientist and researcher in the field of neurodegenerative diseases. He is Professor Emeritus at Emory University in Atlanta, Georgia where he was Associate Director of the Goizueta Alzheimer's Disease Research Center. He is known for his research on the role of abnormal proteins in the causation of Alzheimer's disease.

== Education and career ==
Walker received his Bachelor of Science degree from Louisiana State University and his Master of Science and PhD degrees from Tulane University. Following a German Academic Exchange (DAAD) Fellowship at the University of Kassel and a National Institutes of Health (NIH) postdoctoral fellowship at Emory University, he moved to the Neuropathology Laboratory of Donald L. Price at Johns Hopkins University, where he began work on the biological basis of Alzheimer's disease. In 1995 he became head of the Alzheimer's disease drug discovery program at Parke-Davis/Warner-Lambert in Ann Arbor, Michigan. In 2003 he returned to Emory University where he was the Marie and E.R. Snelling Professor of Neurology until transitioning to emeritus status in 2020.

== Research ==
=== Biology of Aβ plaques ===
Walker's early research established that a variety of neurons are involved in the formation of Aβ plaques, one of the pathological hallmarks of Alzheimer's disease. With Dale Schenk at Athena Neurosciences (later part of Élan Pharmaceuticals), he discovered that antibodies to the Aβ protein can enter the brain from the cerebrospinal fluid and selectively bind to Aβ plaques and cerebral Aβ-amyloid angiopathy (CAA). Based on his work with animal models of Alzheimer's disease, Walker has proposed that humans are uniquely vulnerable to Alzheimer's disease.

=== Prion-like properties of disease-causing proteins ===
Since the late 1990s, Walker's research has been directed toward the mechanisms underlying the misfolding and aggregation of the Aβ protein in the brain. In collaboration with Mathias Jucker at the University of Tübingen, he discovered that the accumulation of Aβ can be initiated in transgenic mouse models by a prion-like mechanism in which 'seeds' of abnormal Aβ precipitate the formation of plaques and CAA. In 2000, Walker and Harry LeVine introduced the term 'proteopathy' (also known as 'proteinopathy') to describe diseases characterized by the misfolding and aggregation of proteins. This terminology has been applied to a number of neurodegenerative disorders and amyloidoses, including tauopathies such as Pick's disease, synucleinopathies such as Parkinson's disease and Lewy Body Dementia, systemic amyloidoses, and others.

== Awards ==
Walker received the Metlife Foundation Award for Medical Research in Alzheimer's Disease in 2014, the Alexander von Humboldt Research Award in 2016, and the Peter Bassoe Lectureship of the American Neuropsychiatric Association in 2017.

== Bibliography ==
=== Selected reviews ===
- Walker, LC; Jucker, M (2013). "Seeds of dementia". Scientific American. 308: 52–7. doi:10.1038/scientificamerican0513-52. PMC 10699165. PMID 23627220..
- Walker, LC; Diamond, MI; Duff, KE; Hyman, BT (2013). "Mechanisms of protein seeding in neurodegenerative diseases". JAMA Neurology. 70: 304–10. doi:10.1001/jamaneurol.2013.1453. PMC 3665718. PMID 23599928..
- Jucker, M; Walker, LC (2013). "Self-propagation of pathogenic protein aggregates in neurodegenerative diseases". Nature. 501: 45–51. Bibcode:2013Natur.501...45J. doi:10.1038/nature12481. PMC 3963807. PMID 24005412..
- Walker, LC; Jucker, M (2015). "Neurodegenerative diseases: expanding the prion concept". Annual Review of Neuroscience. 38: 87–103. doi:10.1146/annurev-neuro-071714-033828. PMC 4803040. PMID 25840008..
- Walker, LC (2016). "Proteopathic Strains and the Heterogeneity of Neurodegenerative Diseases". Annual Review of Genetics. 50: 329–346. doi:10.1146/annurev-genet-120215-034943. PMC 6690197. PMID 27893962..
- Jucker, M; Walker, LC (2018). "Propagation and spread of pathogenic protein assemblies in neurodegenerative diseases". Nature Neuroscience. 21: 1341–1349. doi:10.1038/s41593-018-0238-6. PMC 6375686. PMID 30258241..
- Walker, LC (2020). "Aβ plaques". Free Neuropathology. 1 (31). doi:10.17879/freeneuropathology-2020-3025. PMC 7745791. PMID 33345256..
- Jucker, M; Walker, LC (2023). "Alzheimer's disease: From immunotherapy to immunoprevention". Cell. 186: 4260–4270. doi:10.1016/j.cell.2023.08.021. PMC 10578497. PMID 37729908..
- Walker, LC; Jucker, M (2024). "The prion principle and Alzheimer's disease". Science. 385: 1278–1279. doi:10.1126/science.adq5252. PMC 11492928. PMID 39298592..

=== Selected research reports ===
- Callahan, MJ; Lipinski, WJ; Bian, F; Durham, RA; Pack, A; Walker, LC (2001). "Augmented senile plaque load in aged female beta-amyloid precursor protein-transgenic mice". Am J Pathol. 158: 1173–7. doi:10.1016/s0002-9440(10)64064-3. PMC 1850367. PMID 11238065..
- Meyer-Luehmann, M; Coomaraswamy, J; Bolmont, T; et al. (September 2006). "Exogenous induction of cerebral beta-amyloidogenesis is governed by agent and host". Science. 313: 1781–4. doi:10.1126/science.1131864. PMID 16990547..
- Rosen, RF; Ciliax, BJ; Wingo, TS; Gearing, M; Dooyema, J; Lah, JJ; Ghiso, JA; LeVine, H; Walker, LC (2010). "Deficient high-affinity binding of Pittsburgh compound B in a case of Alzheimer's disease". Acta Neuropathol. 119: 221–233. doi:10.1007/s00401-009-0583-3. PMC 3045810. PMID 19690877..
- Rosen, RF; Fritz, JJ; Dooyema, J; Cintron, AF; Hamaguchi, T; Lah, JJ; LeVine, H; Jucker, M; Walker, LC (2012). "Exogenous seeding of cerebral β-amyloid deposition in βAPP-transgenic rats". J Neurochem. 120: 660–666. doi:10.1111/j.1471-4159.2011.07551.x. PMC 3293176. PMID 22017494..
- Rasmussen, J; Mahler, J; Beschorner, N; Kaeser, SA; Häsler, LM; Baumann, F; Nyström, S; Portelius, E; Blennow, K; Lashley, T; Fox, NC; Sepulveda-Falla, D; Glatzel, M; Oblak, AL; Ghetti, B; Nilsson, KPR; Hammarström, P; Staufenbiel, M; Walker, LC; Jucker, M (2017). "Amyloid polymorphisms constitute distinct clouds of conformational variants in different etiological subtypes of Alzheimer's disease". Proc Natl Acad Sci U S A. 114: 13018–13023. doi:10.1073/pnas.1713215114. PMC 5724274. PMID 29158413..

=== Complete list of published work ===
- https://scholar.google.com/citations?user=Ap8lgXEAAAAJ&hl=en&oi=sra
- nih.gov

=== Selected book chapters ===
- "The neurobiology of aging in nonhuman primates". Walker LC and Cork LC (1999). In: Alzheimer Disease (ISBN 0781715032), RD Terry, R Katzman, KL Bick and SS Sisodia, Eds., Lippincott Williams and Wilkins, Philadelphia, PA, pp 233-243.
- "Pathogenic protein strains as diagnostic and therapeutic targets in Alzheimer's disease". Walker LC, Rosen RF and LeVine III H (2012). In: Alzheimer's Disease: Targets for New Clinical Diagnostic and Therapeutic Strategies (ISBN 978-1-4398-2708-6), R Wegrzyn and AS Rudolph, Eds., CRC Press, Boca Raton, FL, pp 231-247.
- "The prion-like properties of amyloid-β assemblies: Implications for Alzheimer's disease". Walker LC, Schelle J and Jucker M (2017). In: Prion Diseases (ISBN 978-1-621820-10-9), SB Prusiner, Ed., Cold Spring Harbor Laboratory Press, pp 175-188.
- "Prion-like protein seeding and the pathobiology of Alzheimer's disease". Walker LC (2018). In: Protein Folding Disorders in the Central Nervous System (ISBN 978-981-3222-95-3), J. Ghiso and A. Rostagno, Eds., World Scientific Publishing Company, pp 57-82.
