= Biomarkers of Alzheimer's disease =

Neurochemical indicators

The biomarkers of Alzheimer's disease are neurochemical indicators used to assess the risk or presence of the disease. The biomarkers can be used to diagnose Alzheimer's disease (AD) in a very early stage, but they also provide objective and reliable measures of disease progress. It is imperative to diagnose AD disease as soon as possible, because neuropathologic changes of AD precede the symptoms by years. It is well known that amyloid beta (Aβ) is a good indicator of AD disease, which has facilitated doctors to accurately pre-diagnose cases of AD. When Aβ peptide is released by proteolytic cleavage of amyloid-beta precursor protein, some Aβ peptides that are solubilized are detected in CSF and blood plasma which makes AB peptides a promising candidate for biological markers. It has been shown that the amyloid beta biomarker shows 80% or above sensitivity and specificity, in distinguishing AD from dementia. It is believed that amyloid beta as a biomarker will provide a future for diagnosis of AD and eventually treatment of AD.

== Amyloid beta ==
Amyloid beta (Aβ) is composed of a family of peptides produced by proteolytic cleavage of the type I transmembrane spanning glycoprotein amyloid-beta precursor protein (APP). Amyloid plaque Aβ protein species ends in residue 40 or 42, but it is suspected that Aβ42 form is crucial in the pathogenesis of AD. Although Aβ42 makes up less than 10% of total Aβ, it aggregates at much faster rates than Aβ40. Aβ42 is the initial and major component of amyloid plaque deposits. While the most prevalent hypothesis for mechanisms of Aβ-mediated neurotoxicity is structural damage to the synapse, various mechanisms such as oxidative stress, altered calcium homeostasis, induction of apoptosis, structural damage, chronic inflammation and neuronal formation of amyloid has been proposed. Observation of AB42/AB40 ratio has been a promising biomarker for AD. However, as AB42 fails to be a reliable biomarker in plasma, attention was drawn for alternative biomarkers.

== Current biomarkers ==
=== BACE1 ===
Enzymatic cleavage of amyloid-beta precursor protein (APP) by beta-secretase (β-secretase) and gamma-secretase (γ-secretase) produces various forms of amyloid beta (Aβ) peptides. Most β-secretase activity originates from an integral membrane aspartyl protease encoded by the β-site APP-cleaving enzyme 1 gene (BACE1).

Henrik Zetterberg and colleagues developed a sensitive and specific BACE1 assay to measure BACE1 activity in cerebrospinal fluid (CSF) of individuals with Alzheimer’s disease (AD). Their study found increased BACE1 expression and enzymatic activity in patients with AD, suggesting that elevated BACE1 activity may contribute to the amyloidogenic process underlying the disease. CSF BACE1 activity has therefore been proposed as a potential biomarker to monitor amyloidogenic APP metabolism within the central nervous system (CNS).

By selectively disabling BACE1 in oligodendrocytes, researchers reduced Alzheimer's plaques by 30% in mice, proving these cells are a significant source. This suggests a new therapeutic strategy could involve targeting BACE1 specifically in these cells, potentially avoiding the side effects that caused previous BACE1-inhibiting drugs to fail.

=== Soluble Aβ precursor protein (sAPP) ===
APP is an integral membrane protein whose proteolysis generates beta amyloid peptides ranging from 39 to 42 amino acids in length. Although the precise biological functions of APP remain unclear, it has been hypothesized to play a role in neuroregeneration, regulation of neural activity and connectivity, plasticity, and memory.

Large soluble APP fragments (sAPP) have been identified in CSF and are being explored as potential biomarkers for AD. In a study published in Nature, Lewczuk and colleagues examined the performance of soluble APP α and β (sAPPα and sAPPβ), finding significantly elevated levels in individuals with AD compared to controls.

However, findings regarding sAPP levels remain inconsistent. While several studies have reported increased CSF α-sAPP in some AD patients, others have found no significant changes, and Lannfelt and colleagues have even observed slight decreases. These discrepancies highlight the need for further research using experimental models of Alzheimer's disease to establish the reliability of sAPP as a biomarker.

=== Autoantibodies ===
Researchers at Indiana University found that titers of anti-beta-amyloid antibodies in CSF were significantly lower in patients with AD compared to healthy controls. This reduction may reflect impaired immune responses to amyloid pathology in AD and has led to interest in autoantibody levels as a potential diagnostic or prognostic biomarker.

== Novel approach ==
Recent studies primarily focus on use of an autoantibody, not only for biological markers but for future treatment. However, there are various arguments whether an autoantibody method provides a reliable biomarker. A number of reports show that patients with AD have lower levels of serum anti-AB antibodies than healthy individuals, and others have argued that the level of anti-AB antibody may be higher in AD. In order to avoid provide solution for discrepancy in the existing data, Dr. Gustaw came up with novel method of dissociation sample.

=== Theory ===
In biological fluids, antibodies and antigens are in a state of dynamic equilibrium between bound and unbound forms that is concentration-dependent. As antigen masks the antibody, it obstructs accurate measurement of antibody-antigen detection. Dr. Gustow discovered a novel way to enhance antibody-antigen detection. Using a dissociation buffer (1.5% bovine serum albumin (BSA) and 0.2M glycine HCl pH2/5), he dissociated antigen-antibody complexes. In dissociated samples, unbound antigen-antibody complexes reveal increased disease state compared to non-diseased state.

=== Method ===
- Prepare dissociation buffer: 1.4% bovine serum albumin + 0.2M glycine-HCL, pH2.5
- Incubate AB42 for 20 minutes
- Dissolve AB42 in 500 uL dissociation buffer in Microcon centrifugal device
- Incubate at 23 °C (73 °F) for 20 minutes
- Centrifuge for 20 minutes at 16,000 G at 23 °C (73 °F)
- Invert filter and spin for 3 minutes at 2000 G
- Bring the sample back to a neutral pH with 15-2uL 2.5M Tris pH9
- Add ELISA buffer (1.5% BSA and 0.05% Tween 20 in phosphate buffered saline)
- Perform ELISA analysis.

=== Result ===
The white block represents non-dissociation data. The black block represents dissociation data. As the ELISA result shows, the detection of antibody is blocked by addition of beta-amyloid when the experiment was performed without dissociation. Following dissociation, the level of antibody detected increased to a level nearly control to level of control.

He used the same methodology in vivo to examine sera collected from AD patients. The results, surprisingly, demonstrated a significant increase in antibody titer. It contradicts the majority of studies arguing that the amyloid-beta antibody decreases in AD patients. The non-dissociated sample follows the widespread theory that amyloid-beta decreases in AD patients. However, he had already proven that a non-dissociated sample fails to bring out a valid result. The dissociated sample results show significant increases in AD patients, which contradicts the majority of previous studies.

== Contribution ==
Currently, there are many biomarkers for diagnosis of Alzheimer's disease. However, most of them do not provide consistent data results. The novel approach (autoantibody) not only explained the discrepancy of results in previous studies of autoantibody, but provided a new standard as a biomarker of Alzheimer's disease. Compared to other biomarkers which have variable measurements on diagnosis of AD, the new autoantibody approach accurately measures Aβ level with high sensitivity, and proved itself to be an excellent biomarker for Alzheimer's disease. It is believed that the new technology will provide not only future early diagnosis of Alzheimer's disease but also possible therapy for Alzheimer's disease. An open international study group (ND.Neuromark.net) has been constituted for arranging scientific information and developing a rational guide for implementing biomarkers into routine practice.

== See also ==
- Autoantibody
- Amyloid beta
- Biomarker
- BACE1
- Neuroregeneration
- Dementia
