= Experimental models of Alzheimer's disease =

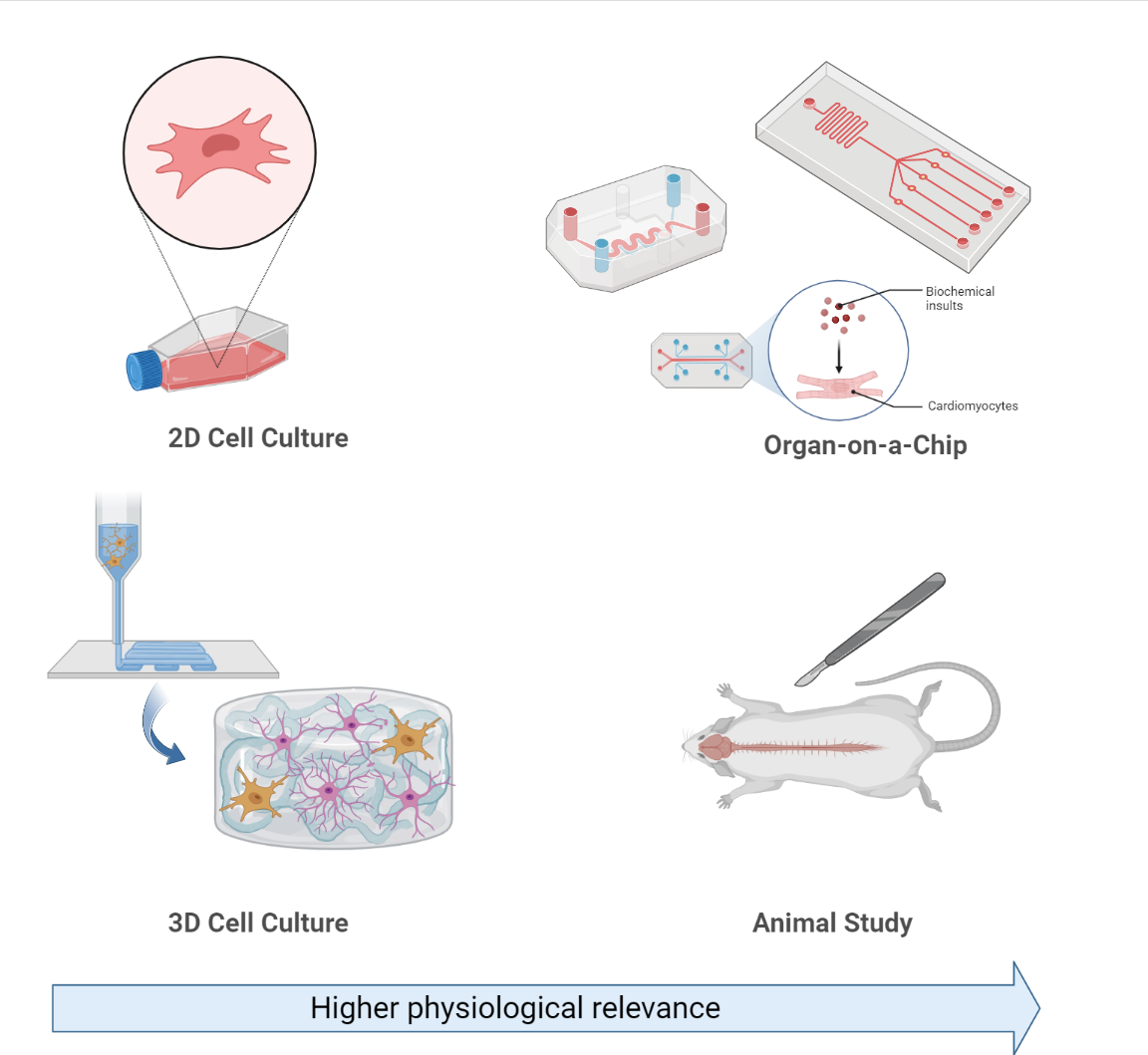
Experimental methods used to study Alzheimer's disease

Experimental models of Alzheimer's disease are organism or cellular models used in research to investigate biological questions about Alzheimer's disease as well as develop and test novel therapeutic treatments. Alzheimer's disease is a progressive neurodegenerative disorder associated with aging, which occurs both sporadically (the most common form of diagnosis) or due to familial passed mutations in genes associated with Alzheimer's pathology. Common symptoms associated with Alzheimer's disease include: memory loss, confusion, and mood changes.

As Alzheimer's disease affects around 55 million patients globally and accounts for approximately 60-70% of all dementia cases, billions of dollars are spent yearly towards research to better understand the biological mechanisms of the disease as well as develop effective therapeutic treatments for it. Researchers commonly use post-mortem human tissue or experimental models to conduct experiments relating to Alzheimer's disease. Experimental models of Alzheimer's disease are particularly useful as they allow complex manipulation of biological systems to elucidate questions about Alzheimer's disease without the risk of harming humans. These models often have genetic modifications that enable them to be more representative of human Alzheimer's disease and its associated pathology: extracellular amyloid-beta (Aβ) plaques and intracellular neurofibrillary tangles (NFTs). Current methods used by researchers are: traditional 2D cell culture, 3D cell culture, microphysiological systems, and animal models.

== Cell culture models ==
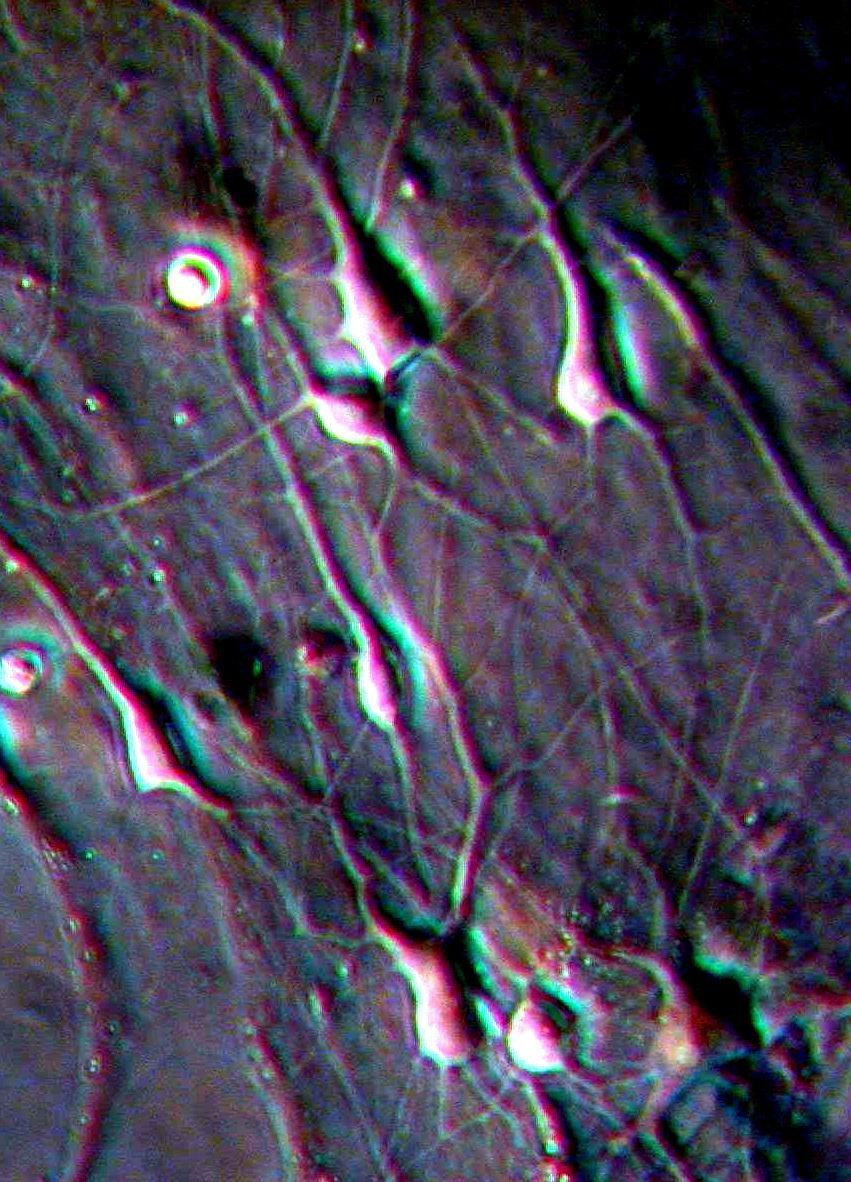
Cortical Neuron Culture

=== 2D cell culture ===
Traditional two dimensional cell culture is a useful experimental model of Alzheimer's disease to conduct experiments in a high throughput manner. These cultures occur on a dish or flask in a monolayer and can be made up of a single cell type or multiple cell types. 2D cultures often have difficulties producing insoluble Amyloid-β plaques even when they are able to secrete the Amyloid-β peptide. Common types of 2D cell culture used to model Alzheimer's disease are immortalized cell lines, primary neuron cultures, and patient derived induced pluripotent stem cells (iPSC).

==== Immortalized cell lines ====
Immortalized cell lines are cells from an organism which have been genetically manipulated to be able to proliferate in vitro, making them a useful tool for researchers as they can do so quickly allowing for high-throughput experimentation. These mutations can occur from a natural caused mutation, like those found in cancer cells, or from being introduced by researchers. Common immortalized cell lines used to study Alzheimer's disease include: human embryonic kidney 293 (HEK293), human neuroblastoma (SH-SY5Y), human neuroglioma (H4), human embryonic mesencephalic (LUHMES), human neural progenitor (ReN), and pheochromocytoma (PC12) cells. These types of cells are commercially available, relatively inexpensive, and easy to culture and maintain. Pro-death compounds can be used in these models to induce Alzheimer's disease related cell death. These compounds include: Amyloid-β 42, tau protein, glutamic acid, and oxidative/pro-inflammatory compounds.

==== Primary neuron culture ====
Primary neuron cultures are generated from embryonic or postnatal rodent brain tissue and cultured on plates. Common brain regions used for cultures to study Alzheimer's disease include the hippocampus, cortex, and amygdala; however any brain region is suitable for cultures. This method requires dissection of the desired brain region from rodent tissue followed by digestion, dissociation, and plating steps. As these cultures are derived directly from rodent brain tissue, they morphologically and physiologically resemble human brain cells, contain multiple neuronal cell types, and do not proliferate. When initially cultured, these cells are spherical and over time begin to form axons, dendrites, and eventually develop synaptic connections.

==== Induced pluripotent stem cells ====
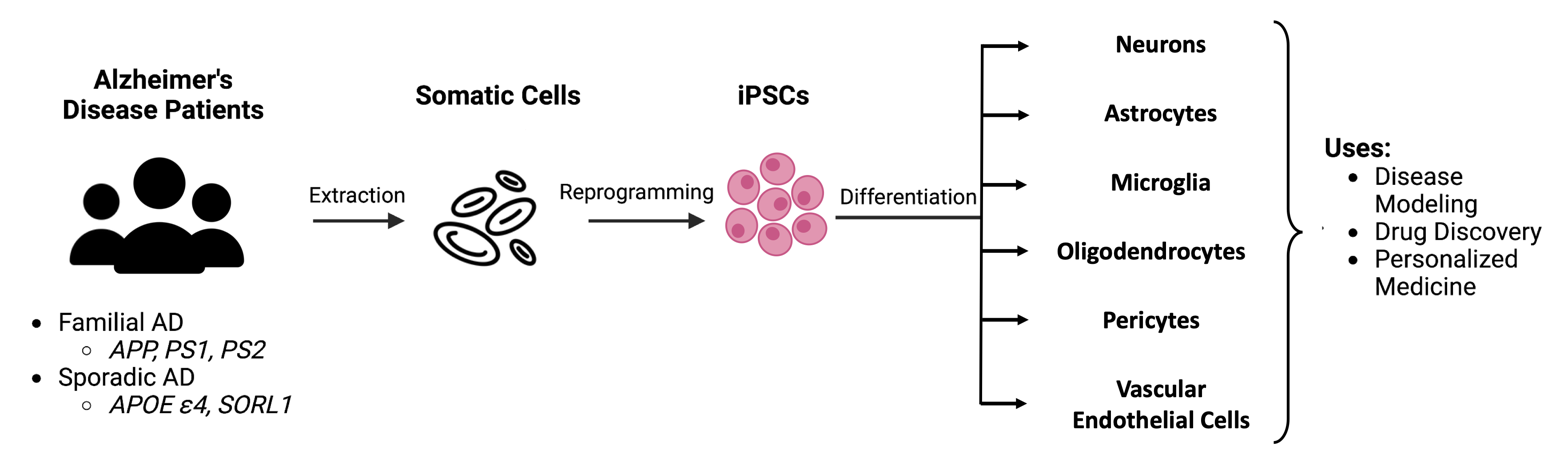
iPSC methods used in Alzheimer's disease research

Patient-derived induced pluripotent stem cell (iPSC) lines are unique in which differentiated somatic cells are taken from Alzheimer's disease patients and reverted into pluripotent stem cells via an ectopic transcriptional "Tamanaka" factor cocktail. These stem cells can then be directed to differentiate into many cell types, including neurons, astrocytes, microglia, oligodendrocytes, pericytes, and endothelial cells. This allows these models to be generated from both early-onset familial Alzheimer's disease (FAD) patients with mutations in APP, PSEN1, or PSEN2 genes as well as late-onset/sporadic Alzheimer's disease (SAD) patients, a population which is not wholly replicated in animal models. As SAD is the most commonly diagnosed form of AD, this highlights iPSCs as key tools for understanding this form of the disease. These cells can also be purchased commercially. CRISPR-Cas9 technology can be used alongside iPSC cells to generate neurons carrying multiple FAD mutations. One major downfall of these models are that they can inadequately resemble mature neurons as well as being more expensive and difficult to maintain. iPSCs have also been shown to exhibit genomic instability and develop additional mutations when passaged (harvested and reseeded into daughter cultures) numerous times, posing both safety concerns for patient use as well as potential reproducibility problems in experimental studies. Due to the nature of reprogramming procedures, iPSC cells lose cellular and epigenetic signatures acquired by aging and environmental factors, limiting iPSCs ability to recapitulate diseases associated with aging, like Alzheimer's disease. While these cultures have some limitations, many fundamental discoveries about Alzheimer's disease biology have been elucidated using this model system.

Important Alzheimer's Disease Findings using iPSCs
Cell Type	Mutation(s)	Importance
Astrocytes	Isogenic PSEN1^{ΔE9}; Isogenic APOE3 and APOE4	PSEN1 astrocytes lacking exon 9 displayed increased amyloid-β production and oxidative stress, decreased neuronal support functionality, and changed calcium homeostasis as well as cytokine release; APOE4 astrocytes showed an increase in cholesterol and reduced amyloid-β clearance
Microglia	Isogenic APOE3 and APOE4	APOE4 microglia showed decreased morphological complexity and reduced uptake of amyloid-β from culture media
Neurons	SAD, APP^{Dp}; Down Syndrome; Isogenic APOE3, APOE4, APOE null	AD neurons from early iPSC experiments showed increased amyloid-β, phosphorylated-tau, and endoscope accumulation; Neurons from patients with Down syndrome (containing triplication of chromosome 21 containing the APP gene) displayed increased amyloid-β secretion and aggregation as well as tau phosphorylation; APOE4 neurons showed increased amounts of amyloid-β and phosphorylated-tau and degeneration of GABAergic neurons
3D Cultures	Overexpression APP^{K670N/M671L}, APP^{V717I}, PSEN1^{ΔE9}; Overexpression APP^{K670N/M671L}, APP^{V717I}, PSEN1^{ΔE9}	Accumulation of amyloid-β from these cells caused filamentous tau deposition; Neurons, astrocytes, and human microglia co-cultured together replicated AD phenotypes, neuroinflammation, and microglial recruitment

=== 3D organoid culture ===
Three dimensional organoid culture methods have become a popular way of recapitulating AD pathology in a more "brain-like" environment than traditional 2D culture as they create an organized structure similar to that of the human cortex. This has proven effective specifically for modeling Alzheimer's disease as 2D cultures tend to fail at producing insoluble amyloid-β while 3D culture models are able. These models consist of multiple neuronal cell types co-cultured together in artificial matrices allowing for the understanding of how non-neuronal cells and neuroinflammation influence Alzheimer's disease pathogenesis. The neuronal cell types expressed in these models often include neurons, astrocytes, microglia, oligodendrocytes, epithelial, and endothelial cells. These organoids develop over many months in order to display Alzheimer's pathology and can be maintained for long periods of time. They can be derived from both iPSCs or immortalized undifferentiated cells and typically reach a diameter of several millimeters. 3D cultures can either be allowed to self-organize or be placed under guided formation in which exogenous factors influence the differentiation pattern of the organoid. 3D culture methods have shown more robust Amyloid-β aggregation, phosphorylated-tau accumulation, and endosome abnormalities than 2D culture methods of the same cell lines, indicating accelerated pathology.

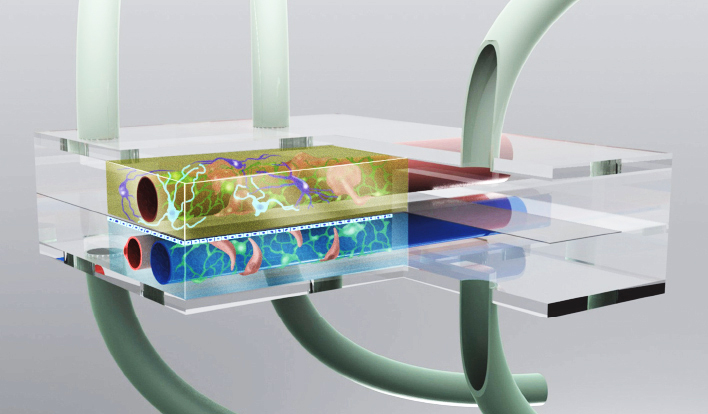
Brain-on-a-Chip

Common issues arising from the use of 3D cultures is the lack of vasculature within the organoid, leading to cell death and dysfunction at inner layers. Current efforts are focusing on introducing endothelial cells into guided formation cultures in order to create vascular systems and provide nutrient distribution to deep layers. Self-organizing organoids also vary in terms in proportion and location of expressed cells causing challenges in reproducibility of experiments. More effort has been placed on guided formation organoids to account for this problem, however this method is more time consuming and difficult to optimize. 3D organoid culture's ability to resemble aging phenotypes is also limited as many organoid methods rely on iPSCs which are more similar to prenatal brain cells due to reprograming protocols. Researchers are currently investigating common transcriptional profiles associated with Alzheimer's disease and aging in order to reintroduce these landscapes into iPSCs for future biomedical research and therapeutic development.

=== Microphysiological systems ===
Neuronal microphysiological systems, also referred to as a "brain-on-a-chip," are a combination of 3D cultures and a microfluidics platform, which circulates the media provided to the cultured cells. These devices are beneficial as they improve cell viability and better model physiological conditions as they improve oxygen availability and nutrient delivery to inner layers of 3D cultures. These systems additionally introduce physiological cues such as fluid sheer stress, tension, and compression which allows these in vitro conditions to better resemble the in vivo environment. Microphysiological systems were shown to replicate Amyloid-β aggregation, hyperphosphorylated tau, and neuroinflammation as well as display microglial recruitment, release of cytokines and chemokines, and microglial neurotoxic activation as a response of more physiologically relevant cell-cell interactions. These systems can also be developed incorporating brain endothelial cells to mimic the blood–brain barrier, making this an extremely useful model for BBB dysfunction in Alzheimer's disease, screening novel therapeutics potential to pass from the blood into the brain, therapeutic pharmacokinetics, as well as drug adsorption, distribution, metabolism, elimination, and toxicity (ADMET) tendencies.

== Animal models ==
=== Rodents ===
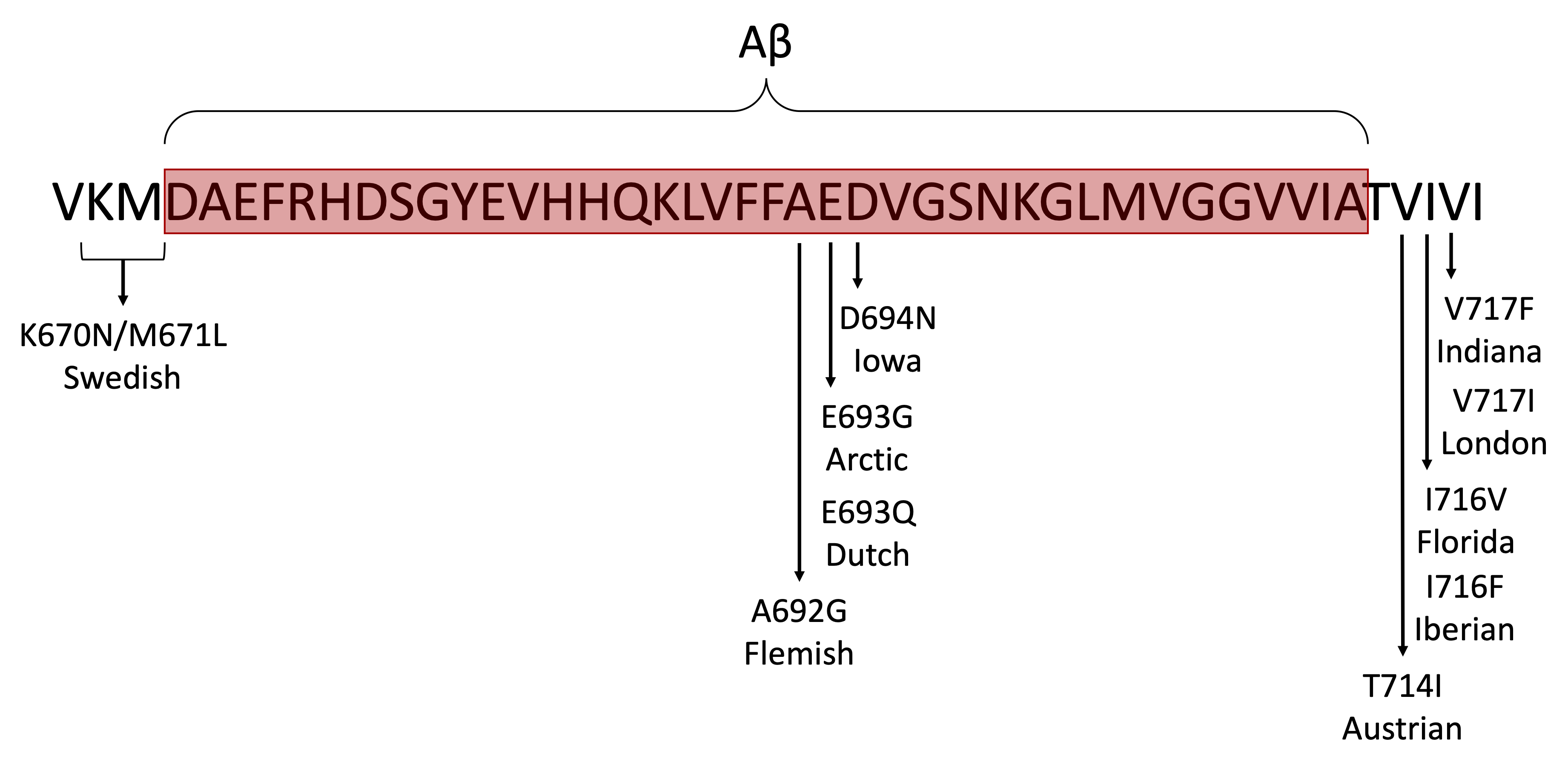
Familial Alzheimer's disease mutations commonly used in animal models

Micrograph showing Aβ plaques (black) in the neocortex and upper striatum of an aged (28 months) Tg2576 transgenic mouse expressing human Aβ-precursor protein (APP). Modified Gallyas silver stain; scale bar = 300 microns (0.3 mm).

Rodent animal models of Alzheimer's disease are commonly used in research as rodents and humans have many of the same major brain regions and neurotransmitter systems. These models are small, easy to house, as well as breed very well. Mice and rats on average tend to live for 2 years, a much shorter lifespan than humans, presenting both limitations as well as benefits for more rapid experiment completion.

In order to recapitulate and accelerate human Alzheimer's disease pathology, scientists commonly introduce FAD associated mutations. Common genes targeted for genetic engineering in animal models are APP, MAPT, PSEN1, PSEN2, and APOE. This results in the animal models having a higher tendency to form amyloid-β plaques and/or neurofibrillary tangles, the two pathological hallmarks of Alzheimer's disease. These mutated genes can either be over-expressed (first generation models) or expressed at endogenous levels (second generation models) as a way of further replicating disease pathology. Scientists also over-express non-mutated human genes in the hope of seeing similar Alzheimer's disease pathology. These introduced mutations or over-expression of human Alzheimer's associated genes, can lead these animals to additionally display cognitive impairment, deficits in long-term potentiation (LTP), synaptic loss, gliosis, and neuronal loss. As current models are highly reliant on FAD mutations to induce Alzheimer's like pathology, there is still no ideal model that fully replicates SAD (sporadic Alzheimer's disease), which is the most common type of diagnosis in patients.

Common methods used to generate these lines are the use of transgenes controlled by a specific promoter, Cre-Lox recombination, and the CRISPR-Cas9 system. Scientists can also use injection methods such as intracerebroventricular injection, intravenous injection, or intrahippocampal injection to modify wild type rodents into displaying Alzheimer's disease pathology. These rodent models are often used to test and develop drugs treating Alzheimer's disease before progressing to clinical trials in humans.

==== Mouse models ====
Name	Genes	Modification Information	Promoter	Known Pathology (Age of Onset in Months)
APP Models
APPSwe TgC3-3	APP	Express both murine and human APP carrying the Swedish mutation	Murine PrP	Aβ plaques (24-26 mo)
Tg2576	APP	Over-expresses human APP with the Swedish mutation	Hamster PrP	Synaptic loss (4-6 mo), LTP deficits (4-6 mo), cognitive impairment (4-6 mo), gliosis (10-16 mo), Aβ plaques (11-13 mo)
APP23	APP	Display a 7-fold over-expression of human APP carrying the Swedish mutation	Murine Thy1	Cognitive impairment (3 mo), Aβ plaques (6 mo), gliosis (6 mo), neuronal loss (14-18 mo)
PDAPP	APP	Over-express human APP carrying the Indiana mutation	PDGFβ	Cognitive impairment (3 mo), LTP deficits (4-5 mo), Aβ plaques (6 mo), gliosis (6 mo), synaptic loss (8 mo)
TgCRND8	APP	Display 5-fold over-expression of human APP carrying the Swedish and Indiana mutations	Syrian hamster PrP	Cognitive impairment (3 mo), Aβ plaques (3 mo), gliosis (3 mo), LTP deficit (6 mo), synaptic loss (6 mo), neuronal loss (6 mo)
APP^{NL-F}	APP	Express humanized APP with the Swedish and Iberian mutations	N/A	Aβ plaques (6 mo), gliosis (6 mo), synaptic loss (9-12 mo), cognitive impairment (18 mo)
APP^{NL-G-F}	APP	Express endogenous levels of humanized APP carrying the Swedish, Iberian, and Arctic mutations	N/A	Aβ plaques (2 mo), gliosis (2 mo), synaptic loss (4 mo), cognitive impairment (6 mo)
Tau Models
JNPL3	MAPT	Express 4 repeat human Tau carrying the P301L mutation	Murine PrP	Neurofibrillary tangles (4.5 mo), neuronal loss (10 mo), gliosis (10 mo)
pR5	MAPT	Over-express 4 repeat human Tau carrying the P301L mutation	Murine Thy1	Cognitive impairment (5 mo), LTP deficits (6 mo), gliosis (7 mo), neurofibrillary tangles (8 mo)
Tau P301S	MAPT	Over-express human Tau carrying the P301S mutation	Murine PrP	Gliosis (3 mo), synaptic loss (3 mo), neurofibrillary tangles (6 mo), LTP defects (6 mo), cognitive impairment (6 mo), neuronal loss (9-12 mo)
PSEN Models
PS1 M146V	PSEN1	Over-express PSEN1 with the M146V mutation	Rat PDGFβ	Neuropathology is absent in these mice. Cognitive ability has not been observed.
Other Models
TAPP	APP, MAPT	Over-expression of human APP carrying the Swedish mutation and 4 repeat human Tau with the P301L mutation.	Hamster PrP, Murine PrP	Neurofibrillary tangles (3 mo), gliosis (3 mo), Aβ plaques (9 mo)
3xTg-AD	APP, PSEN1, MAPT	Express human APP with the Swedish mutation, MAPT with the P301L mutation, and PSEN1 with the M146V mutation	Murine Thy1 (PS1 knockin)	Cognitive impairment (4 mo), Aβ plaques (6 mo), LTP deficits (6 mo), gliosis (7 mo), neurofibrillary tangles (12 mo)
PSAPP	APP, PSEN1	Over-express human APP with the Swedish mutation and PSEN1 with the M146L mutation	Hamster PrP, PDGFβ	Cognitive impairment (3 mo), Aβ plaques (6 mo), gliosis (6 mo), neuronal loss (22 mo)
5xFAD (B6SJL)	APP, PSEN1	Over-express human APP with the Swedish, Florida, and London mutations and PSEN1 with the M146L and L286V mutations	Murine Thy1	Aβ plaques (2 mo), gliosis (2 mo), synaptic loss (4 mo), cognitive impairment (4-5 mo), LTP deficit (4-6 mo), neuronal loss (4-6 mo)
5xFAD (C57BL6)	APP, PSEN1	Over-express human APP with the Swedish, Florida, and London mutations and PSEN1 with the M146L and L286V mutations	Murine Thy1	LTP deficits (2 mo), Aβ plaques (2 mo), gliosis (2 mo), cognitive impairment (3-6 mo), synaptic loss (3-6 mo), neuronal loss (12 mo)
huAPOE KI	APOE2, APOE3, APOE4	Express humanized APOE2, APOE3, or APOE4	N/A	No data

==== Rat models ====
Name	Genes	Modification Information	Promoter	Known Pathology (Age of Onset in Months)
McGill-R-Thy1-APP	APP	Express human APP with the Swedish and Indiana mutations	Murine Thy1.2	Cognitive impairment (3 mo), LTP deficits (3 mo), Aβ plaques (6 mo), gliosis (6 mo), neuronal loss (18 mo), synaptic loss (20 mo)
APP^{NL-G-F}KI	APP	Express humanized Aβ with the Swedish, Arctic, and Iberian mutations	N/A	Aβ plaques (1 mo), cognitive impairment (5-7 mo), gliosis (6 mo), synaptic loss (6 mo), neuronal loss (12 mo)
APP+PS1	APP, PSEN1	Express human APP with the Swedish and Indiana mutations and human PSEN1 with the L166P mutation	UBC	Cognitive impairment (10 mo); Aβ plaques (19 mo), neuronal loss (19 mo)
TgF344-AD	APP, PSEN1	Express human APP with the Swedish mutation and human PSEN1 with the Δexon9 mutation	Murine PrP	Gliosis (6 mo), cognitive impairment (6 mo), Aβ plaques (6 mo), neurofibrillary tangles (16 mo), neuronal loss (16 mo)

=== Non-human primates ===
Micrograph of Aβ plaques in the neocortex of an aged rhesus macaque (Macaca mulatta). Immunohistochemical stain for Aβ42; scale bar = 100 microns (0.1 mm).

Non-human primates can be used by researchers to study mechanisms of Alzheimer's disease as well as in the development of therapeutics. Non-human primates are useful as they have a more similar aging pattern to humans compared to rodent models. Aging nonhuman primates can display neuropathy, cognitive changes, and amyloid-β deposits. While these models are useful in studying the process of aging, they are not exact models of Alzheimer's disease. Some non-human primates commonly used in AD research include: rhesus monkeys (Macaca mulatta), stump-tailed macaques (Macaca arctoides), mouse lemurs (Microcebus murinus), the common marmoset (Callithrix jacchus), and crab-eating macaques (Macaca fascicularis). These animals can be studied both as naturally occurring models of age-related changes or through the artificial induction of Alzheimer-like changes in the brain. Common techniques used to induce these models include: cholinergic nervous system injury, amyloid-β injection, intrinsic formaldehyde, and streptozotocin (a methyl nitrosourea sugar compound which induces diabetes).

=== Alternative organisms ===
- Zebrafish
- Drosophila
- Caenorhabditis elegans
