= Donald D. Price =

American neuroscientist (1942–2016)

- Born: Donald Dennis Price; 1942
- Died: 2016 (aged 73–74)
- Education: University of California, Davis
- Known for: Research on biological mechanisms of pain
- Scientific career
- Fields: Neuroscience; Psychology
- Institutions: Medical College of Virginia; National Institute of Dental Research; University of Florida
- Thesis: Spinal cord mechanisms subserving the transmission of noxious information in M. mulatta (1969)

Donald D. Price (1942 – 2016) was an American neuroscientist and psychologist known for his research on the mechanisms of pain in humans. He served as Professor of Oral and Maxillofacial Surgery and Diagnostic Sciences at the University of Florida, where he was named a UF Research Foundation Professor in 2003. He was named an honorary member of the International Association for the Study of Pain in 2014. The University of Florida's Center for Pain Research and Behavioral Health awards the Donald D. Price Memorial Publication Award in his honor.
