= Donald L. Price =

American neuropathologist (1935–2023)

Donald Lowell Price (June 16, 1935 – May 5, 2023) was an American neuropathologist and professor at the Johns Hopkins School of Medicine. His research aimed to understand the molecular basis of neurodegenerative diseases, particularly Alzheimer's disease. Price received a number of awards for his work and served as the President of both the American Association of Neuropathologists and the Society for Neuroscience.

== Background ==
Price was born in Stamford, Connecticut on June 16, 1935. He attended Wesleyan University, where he received a Bachelor of Arts in English Literature. In 1961, he received his medical degree from Albany Medical College of Union University. Following graduation, Dr. Price was a Medical Intern and Resident at the New England Medical Center, Boston, MA ( 1961–1963), and he completed a Neurology Residency at the Massachusetts General Hospital, Boston, MA (1963-1968). He was a Staff Neurologist at the National Naval Medical Center in Bethesda, Maryland (1966–1968). He returned to Boston as a Senior Fellow in Neuropathology at Mass General (1968–1969) and as a Research Fellow in Cell/Molecular Biology (with Keith Porter)(1969-1970) at Harvard University. Price died after a long illness on May 5, 2023, at the age of 87.

== Career ==
Price's first faculty appointment was as an assistant professor in the Departments of Neurology and Pathology at Harvard Medical School in 1970. In 1971, he was recruited to the Johns Hopkins School of Medicine, becoming the Founding Director of the Division of Neuropathology. At Hopkins, Price was a professor of pathology, Neurology, and Neuroscience.

Price served as President of the American Association of Neuropathologists from 1989 to 1990. From 2000 to 2001, he served as President of the Society for Neuroscience. Price was a member of The Institute of Medicine (National Academy of Sciences)(1998).

Over the course of his career, Price trained hundreds of medical and graduate students, house officers and postdoctoral fellows. His trainees include many prominent basic scientists and clinicians at a variety of medical schools, universities, and government institutions. During the "Decade of the Brain" (1990-2000), Price was ranked among the top ten neuroscientists as authors of high-impact papers in neuroscience by Science Watch (12 102 2001).

== Research ==
Price first focused on the biology of motor neurons, but later in his career, he became interested in brain mechanisms underlying neurodegenerative diseases, particularly [Alzheimer's disease]". He often used animal models in order to "allow a more direct insight into pathogenesis", in parallel with comparative analyses of disease in humans. His work with transgenic mice sought to experimentally test new treatment mechanisms before they reached human subjects. These studies identified specific genes that are often risk factors, particularly genes related to the generation and aggregation of Amyloid beta, a key component of Abeta plaques in the brain.

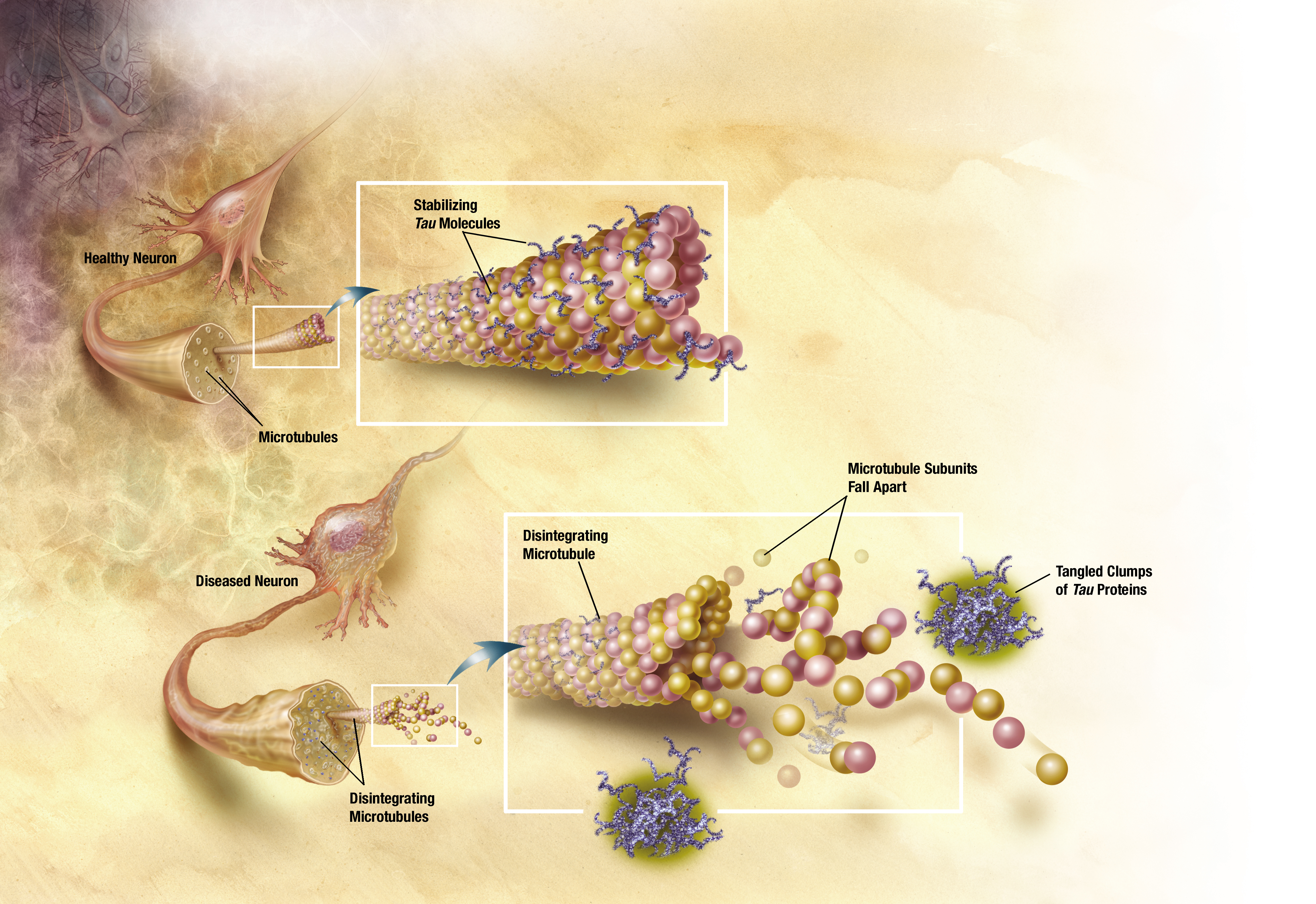
Defects in the Brain due to Alzheimer's disease

In 1985, Price became Principal Investigator of the Alzheimer's Disease Research Center at Johns Hopkins University, one of the first federally funded Alzheimer's Disease Research Centers in the United States.

== Awards and honors ==
Year	Award/Honor
1989	Metropolitan Life Foundation Award
1990	President of the American Association of Neuropathologists
1992	Potamkin Prize for Alzheimer's Disease Research
1994	Leadership in Alzheimer's Disease (LEAD) Award (National Institute of Aging)
2000-2001	President of the Society for Neuroscience
2001	Wartenberg Award
2012	The Award for Meritorious Contributions to Neuropathology
2015	AAIC Lifetime Achievement Awards in Alzheimer's Disease
1986 2000	2 Javits Neuroscience Investigator Merit Awards (National Institute of Neurological Disorders and Stroke)

== Publications ==
Below are some of Price's highly cited publications:

- Troncoso, Juan C.; Crain, Barbara J.; Sisodia, Sangram S.; Price, Donald L. (2019). "Pathology, Neurobiology, and Animal Models of Alzheimer's Disease". Alzheimer's Disease. pp. 125–144. doi:10.1201/9780429260353-17. ISBN 978-0-429-26035-3. S2CID 243260534.
- Savonenko, Alena V.; Melnikova, Tatiana; Li, Tong; Price, Donald L.; Wong, Philip C. (2015). "Alzheimer Disease". Neurobiology of Brain Disorders. pp. 321–338. doi:10.1016/B978-0-12-398270-4.00021-5. ISBN 978-0-12-398270-4.
- Wong, Philip C.; Chiang, Po-Min; Martin, Lee J.; Koliatsos, Vassilis; Price, Donald L. (2012). "Motor Neuron Diseases". Basic Neurochemistry. pp. 801–814. doi:10.1016/B978-0-12-374947-5.00045-6. ISBN 978-0-12-374947-5.
- Tsao, William; Jeong, Yun Ha; Lin, Sophie; Ling, Jonathan; Price, Donald L.; Chiang, Po-Min; Wong, Philip C. (2012). "Rodent models of TDP-43: Recent advances". Brain Research. 1462: 26–39. doi:10.1016/j.brainres.2012.04.031. PMC 3613131. PMID 22608070.
- Li, Tong; Li, Yue-Ming; Ahn, Kwangwook; Price, Donald L.; Sisodia, Sangram S.; Wong, Philip C. (2011). "Increased Expression of PS1 is Sufficient to Elevate the Level and Activity of γ-Secretase in Vivo". PLOS ONE. 6 (11) e28179. Bibcode:2011PLoSO...628179L. doi:10.1371/journal.pone.0028179. PMC 3226664. PMID 22140537.
- Farah, M. H.; Pan, B. H.; Hoffman, P. N.; Ferraris, D.; Tsukamoto, T.; Nguyen, T.; Wong, P. C.; Price, D. L.; Slusher, B. S.; Griffin, J. W. (2011). "Reduced BACE1 Activity Enhances Clearance of Myelin Debris and Regeneration of Axons in the Injured Peripheral Nervous System". Journal of Neuroscience. 31 (15): 5744–5754. doi:10.1523/JNEUROSCI.6810-10.2011. PMC 3302726. PMID 21490216.
- Borchelt, D. R.; Lee, M. K.; Slunt, H. S.; Guarnieri, M.; Xu, Z. S.; Wong, P. C.; Brown, R. H.; Price, D. L.; Sisodia, S. S.; Cleveland, D. W. (1994). "Superoxide dismutase 1 with mutations linked to familial amyotrophic lateral sclerosis possesses significant activity". Proceedings of the National Academy of Sciences. 91 (17): 8292–8296. Bibcode:1994PNAS...91.8292B. doi:10.1073/pnas.91.17.8292. PMC 44592. PMID 8058797.
