= Ion channel hypothesis of Alzheimer's disease =

The ion channel hypothesis of Alzheimer's disease (AD), also known as the channel hypothesis or the amyloid beta ion channel hypothesis, is a more recent variant of the amyloid hypothesis of AD, which identifies amyloid beta (Aβ) as the underlying cause of neurotoxicity seen in AD. While the traditional formulation of the amyloid hypothesis pinpoints insoluble, fibrillar aggregates of Aβ as the basis of disruption of calcium ion homeostasis and subsequent apoptosis in AD, the ion channel hypothesis in 1993 introduced the possibility of an ion-channel-forming oligomer of soluble, non-fibrillar Aβ as the cytotoxic species allowing unregulated calcium influx into neurons in AD.

The ion channel hypothesis is broadly supported as an explanation for the calcium ion influx that disrupts calcium ion homeostasis and induces apoptosis in neurons. Because the extracellular deposition of Aβ fibrils in senile plaques is not sufficient to predict risk or onset of AD, and clinical trials of drugs that target the Aβ fibrillization process have largely failed, the ion channel hypothesis provides novel molecular targets for continued development of AD therapies and for better understanding of the mechanism underlying onset and progression of AD.

== History ==
The ion channel hypothesis was first proposed by Arispe and colleagues in 1993 upon discovery that Aβ could form unregulated cation-selective ion channels when incorporated into planar lipid bilayers. Further research showed that a particular fragment of Aβ, Aβ (25-35), spontaneously inserts into planar lipid bilayers to form weakly selective ion channels and that membrane insertion occurs non-specifically, irreversibly, and with a broad range of oligomer conformations. Though more recent studies have found that Aβ channels can be blocked by small molecules, the broad variety of Aβ ion channel conformations and chemistries make it difficult to design a channel blocker specific to Aβ without compromising other ion channels in the cell membrane.

== Structure ==
The Aβ monomer generally assumes an α-helical formation in aqueous solution, but can reversibly transition between α-helix and β-sheet structures at varying polarities. Atomic force microscopy captured images of Aβ channel structures that facilitated calcium uptake and subsequent neuritic degeneration. Molecular dynamics simulations of Aβ in lipid bilayers suggest that Aβ adopts a β-sheet-rich structure within lipid bilayers that gradually evolves to result in a wide variety of relaxed channel conformations. In particular, data support the organization of Aβ channels in β-barrels, structural formations commonly seen in transmembrane pore-forming toxins including anthrax.

== Properties ==
Aβ channels are selective for cations over anions, voltage-independent, and display a long channel lifetime, from minutes to hours. They can be extremely large, up to 5 nS in size, and can insert into the cell membrane from aqueous solution. Aβ channels are heterogeneous and allow flow of physiologically relevant ions such as Ca^{2+}, Na^{+}, K^{+}, Cs^{+}, and Li^{+} across the cell membrane.

== Mechanism of action ==
=== Channel formation ===
Cytotoxicity caused by ion channel formation is commonly seen in the world of bacteria. While eukaryotic cells are generally less vulnerable to channel-forming toxins because of their larger volume and stiffer, sterol-containing membranes, several eukaryotic channel-forming toxins have been seen to sidestep these obstacles by forming especially large, stable ion channels or anchoring to sterols in the cell membrane. Neurons are particularly vulnerable to channel-forming toxins because of their reliance on maintenance of strict Na^{+}, K^{+}, and Ca^{2+} concentration gradients and membrane potential for proper functioning and action potential propagation. Leakage caused by insertion of an ion channel such as Aβ rapidly alters intracellular ionic concentrations, resulting in energetic stress, failure of signaling, and cell death.

=== Ionic leakage ===
The large, poorly selective, and long-lived nature of Aβ channels allows rapid degradation of membrane potential in neurons. A single Aβ channel 4 nS in size can cause Na^{+} concentration to change as much as 10 μM/s. Degradation of membrane potential in this manner also generates additional Ca^{2+} influx through voltage-sensitive Ca^{2+} channels in the plasma membrane. Ionic leakage alone has been demonstrated to be sufficient to rapidly disrupt cellular homeostasis and induce cell necrosis.

=== Mitochondrial pathway of apoptosis ===
Aβ channels may also trigger apoptosis through insertion in mitochondrial membranes. Aβ injection in rats has been shown to damage mitochondrial structure in neurons, decrease mitochondrial membrane potential, and increase intracellular Ca^{2+} concentration. Additionally, Aβ accumulation increases expression of genes associated with the mitochondrial permeability transition pore (MPTP), a non-selective, high conductance channel spanning the inner and outer mitochondrial membrane. Ca^{2+} influx into mitochondria can collapse mitochondrial membrane potential, causing MPTP opening, which then induces mitochondrial swelling, further dissipation of membrane potential, generation of mitochondrial reactive oxygen species (ROS), rupture of the outer mitochondrial membrane, and release of apoptogenic factors such as cytochrome c.

== Therapeutic potential ==
=== Current treatments ===
The only treatments currently approved for AD are either cholinesterase inhibitors (such as donepezil) or glutamate receptor antagonists (such as memantine), which show limited efficacy in treating symptoms or halting progression of AD. The slight improvement in cognitive function brought about by these drugs is only seen in patients with mild to moderate AD, and is confined to the first year of treatment, as efficacy progressively declines, completely disappearing by 2 or 3 years of treatment. Extensive research has gone into the design of potential AD treatments to reduce Aβ production or aggregation, but these therapeutics have historically failed in Phase III clinical trials. The ion channel hypothesis of AD provides a novel avenue for development of AD therapies that may more directly target the underlying pathophysiology of AD.

=== Channel blockers ===
Nonspecific Aβ channel blockers including tromethamine (Tris) and Zn^{2+} have successfully inhibited Aβ cytotoxicity. Least-energy molecular models of the Aβ channel have been used to create polypeptide segments to target the mouth of the Aβ pore, and these selective Aβ channel blockers have also been shown to inhibit Aβ cytotoxicity. Structural modeling of Aβ channels, however, suggests that the channels are highly polymorphic, with the ability to move and change size and shape within the lipid membrane. The broad range of conformations adopted by the Aβ channel makes design of a specific, highly effective Aβ channel blocker difficult.

=== Membrane hyperpolarization ===
Indirect methods such as membrane hyperpolarization may help limit the cytotoxic depolarizing effects of Aβ channels. Potassium ATP channel activation has been demonstrated to attenuate Ca^{2+} influx and reduce oxidative stress in neurons, as well as to improve memory and reduce Aβ and tau pathology in a transgenic AD mouse model. Similarly, drugs that block voltage-gated Ca^{2+} channels have also been shown to protect neurons from Aβ toxicity.

== Other amyloid channels ==
Several other classes of amyloid proteins also form ion channels, including proteins implicated in type II diabetes mellitus, prion diseases, Parkinson's disease, and Huntington's disease. Consistent with Aβ channels, other amyloid channels have also been reported to be large, non-selective, voltage-independent, heterogeneous, and irreversible. These distinct properties set amyloid channels apart from other ion channels in neurons and facilitate unregulated ionic leakage resulting in cell depolarization, disruption of ion homeostasis, and cell death. Further investigation of amyloid proteins and the cytotoxic effects of amyloid channel formation is necessary for development of drug candidates that are able to selectively block amyloid channels or bind them prior to membrane insertion, an area of research that may prove highly relevant to not just AD but a wide variety of other diseases.
