= Mathias Jucker =

Swiss neuroscientist (b. 1961)

- Born: 7 July 1961 (age 65); Zürich, Switzerland
- Education: ETH Zürich (Swiss Federal Institute of Technology Zürich; German: Eidgenössische Technische Hochschule Zürich)
- Known for: Prion-like mechanisms in Alzheimer's disease
- Awards: Research Prize of the Swiss Alzheimer Association (2001); Zenith Fellows Award (2006); Soriano Lectureship (2010); Hamburg Science Award from the Academy of Sciences and Humanities in Hamburg (2013); Metlife Foundation Award for Medical Research in Alzheimer's Disease (2014); International Prize for Translational Neuroscience of the Gertrud Reemtsma Foundation (Max-Planck-Gesellschaft) (2020)
- Scientific career
- Fields: Neuroscience; Neurology
- Workplaces: National Institute of Aging, USA; Swiss Federal Institute of Technology Zürich, Switzerland; University of Basel, Switzerland; University of Tübingen, Germany
- Website: www.hih-tuebingen.de/cn/ www.dzne.de/jucker

Mathias Jucker (born 7 July 1961 in Zürich, Switzerland) is a Swiss neuroscientist, Professor, and a Director at the Hertie Institute for Clinical Brain Research of the University of Tübingen. He is also a group leader at the German Center for Neurodegenerative Diseases (German: Deutsches Zentrum für Neurodegenerative Erkrankungen, (DZNE)) in Tübingen. Jucker is known for his research on the basic biologic mechanisms underlying brain aging and Alzheimer's disease.

== Education and career ==
Jucker received his doctoral degree (1988) in Natural Sciences from ETH Zürich, after which he began his research on aging in the brain at the National Institute on Aging (NIA) in Baltimore, United States, and then at the University of Basel (Switzerland). In 2003 he became Full Professor of Cell Biology of Neurological Diseases at the University of Tübingen. In 2009 he was named a group leader at the DZNE in Tübingen, and in 2012 he became the founding coordinator of the Dominantly Inherited Alzheimer's Disease Network (DIAN) in Germany.

== Research ==
=== Prion-like properties of disease-causing proteins ===
Jucker's research has focused on understanding how certain proteins cause disease by adopting abnormal 3-dimensional shapes (conformations) in the nervous system. In collaboration with Lary Walker, Jucker was the first to show in experimental mice that the accumulation of abnormally folded proteins in Alzheimer's disease occurs by a prion-like mechanism. The prion concept has since been expanded to include several other proteins, including tau and α-synuclein, which similarly misfold and aggregate in a class of diseases known as proteopathies.

=== Biomarkers of Alzheimer's disease ===
Jucker also has contributed to the development and validation of biomarkers for Alzheimer's disease and other neurodegenerative disorders. He found that changes in cerebrospinal fluid (CSF) biomarkers in mouse models closely resemble the changes in humans with Alzheimer's disease, and he and his colleagues showed that a protein in neurons known as neurofilament light chain can serve as a biomarker in the blood and cerebrospinal fluid that can be used to determine the progression of Alzheimer's Disease.

== Awards ==
Jucker has received the Research Prize of the Swiss Alzheimer Association (2001), the Zenith Fellows Award of the Alzheimer's Association (2006), the Soriano Lectureship of the American Neurological Association (2010), the Hamburg Science Award for dementia research from the Academy of Sciences and Humanities in Hamburg (2013), the Metlife Foundation Award for Medical Research in Alzheimer's Disease (2014), and the International Prize for Translational Neuroscience of the Gertrud Reemtsma Foundation (Max-Planck-Gesellschaft) (2020).

== Bibliography ==
=== Selected research publications ===
- Pfeifer, M; Boncristiano, S; Bondolfi, L; Stalder, A; Deller, T; Staufenbiel, M; Mathews, PM; Jucker, M (2002). "Cerebral hemorrhage after passive anti-Abeta immunotherapy". Science. 298: 1379. doi:10.1126/science.1078259. PMID 12434053..
- Herzig, MC; Winkler, DT; Burgermeister, P; Pfeifer, M; Kohler, E; Schmidt, SD; Danner, S; Abramowski, D; Stürchler-Pierrat, C; Bürki, K; van Duinen, SG; Maat-Schieman, ML; Staufenbiel, M; Mathews, PM; Jucker, M (2004). "Abeta is targeted to the vasculature in a mouse model of hereditary cerebral hemorrhage with amyloidosis". Nature Neuroscience. 7: 954–60. doi:10.1038/nn1302. PMID 15311281..
- Meyer-Luehmann, M; Coomaraswamy, J; Bolmont, T; et al. (September 2006). "Exogenous induction of cerebral beta-amyloidogenesis is governed by agent and host". Science. 313: 1781–4. doi:10.1126/science.1131864. PMID 16990547..
- Grathwohl, SA; Kälin, RE; Bolmont, T; Prokop, S; Winkelmann, G; Kaeser, SA; Odenthal, J; Radde, R; Eldh, T; Gandy, S; Aguzzi, A; Staufenbiel, M; Mathews, PM; Wolburg, H; Heppner, FL; Jucker, M (2009). "Formation and maintenance of Alzheimer's disease beta-amyloid plaques in the absence of microglia". Nature Neuroscience. 12: 1361–3. doi:10.1038/nn.2432. PMC 4721582. PMID 19838177..
- Eisele, YS; Obermüller, U; Heilbronner, G; Baumann, F; Kaeser, SA; Wolburg, H; Walker, LC; Staufenbiel, M; Heikenwalder, M; Jucker, M (2010). "Peripherally applied Abeta-containing inoculates induce cerebral beta-amyloidosis". Science. 330: 980–2. doi:10.1126/science.1194516. PMC 3233904. PMID 20966215..
- Jucker, M (2010). "The benefits and limitations of animal models for translational research in neurodegenerative diseases". Nature Medicine. 16: 1210–4. doi:10.1038/nm.2224. PMID 21052075..
- Eisenberg, D; Jucker, M (2012). "The amyloid state of proteins in human diseases". Cell. 148: 1188–203. doi:10.1016/j.cell.2012.02.022. PMC 3353745. PMID 22424229..
- Maia, LF; Kaeser, SA; Reichwald, J; Hruscha, M; Martus, P; Staufenbiel, M; Jucker, M (2013). "Changes in amyloid-β and Tau in the cerebrospinal fluid of transgenic mice overexpressing amyloid precursor protein". Science Translational Medicine. 5: 194re2. doi:10.1126/scitranslmed.3006446. PMID 23863834..
- Jucker, M; Walker, LC (2013). "Self-propagation of pathogenic protein aggregates in neurodegenerative diseases". Nature. 501: 45–51. doi:10.1038/nature12481. PMC 3963807. PMID 24005412..
- Ye, L; Fritschi, SK; Schelle, J; Obermüller, U; Degenhardt, K; Kaeser, SA; Eisele, YS; Walker, LC; Baumann, F; Staufenbiel, M; Jucker, M (2015). "Persistence of Aβ seeds in APP null mouse brain". Nature Neuroscience. 18: 1559–61. doi:10.1038/nn.4117. PMID 26352792..
- Bacioglu, M; Maia, LF; Preische, O; Schelle, J; Apel, A; Kaeser, SA; Schweighauser, M; Eninger, T; Lambert, M; Pilotto, A; Shimshek, DR; Neumann, U; Kahle, PJ; Staufenbiel, M; Neumann, M; Maetzler, W; Kuhle, J; Jucker, M (2016). "Neurofilament Light Chain in Blood and CSF as Marker of Disease Progression in Mouse Models and in Neurodegenerative Diseases". Neuron. 91: 56–66. doi:10.1016/j.neuron.2016.05.018. hdl:11379/492217. PMID 27292537..
- Füger, P; Hefendehl, JK; Veeraraghavalu, K; Wendeln, AC; Schlosser, C; Obermüller, U; Wegenast-Braun, BM; Neher, JJ; Martus, P; Kohsaka, S; Thunemann, M; Feil, R; Sisodia, SS; Skodras, A; Jucker, M (2017). "Microglia turnover with aging and in an Alzheimer's model via long-term in vivo single-cell imaging". Nature Neuroscience. 20: 1371–1376. doi:10.1038/nn.4631. PMID 28846081..
- Jucker, M; Walker, LC (2018). "Propagation and spread of pathogenic protein assemblies in neurodegenerative diseases". Nature Neuroscience. 21: 1341–1349. doi:10.1038/s41593-018-0238-6. PMC 6375686. PMID 30258241..
- Preische, O; Schultz, SA; Apel, A; Kuhle, J; Kaeser, SA; Barro, C; Gräber, S; Kuder-Buletta, E; LaFougere, C; Laske, C; Vöglein, J; Levin, J; Masters, CL; Martins, R; Schofield, PR; Rossor, MN; Graff-Radford, NR; Salloway, S; Ghetti, B; Ringman, JM; Noble, JM; Chhatwal, J; Goate, AM; Benzinger, TLS; Morris, JC; Bateman, RJ; Wang, G; Fagan, AM; McDade, EM; Gordon, BA; Jucker, M (2019). "Serum neurofilament dynamics predicts neurodegeneration and clinical progression in presymptomatic Alzheimer's disease". Nature Medicine. 25: 277–283. doi:10.1038/s41591-018-0304-3. PMC 6367005. PMID 30664784..
- Jucker, M; Walker, LC (2023). "Alzheimer's disease: From immunotherapy to immunoprevention". Cell. 186: 4260–4270. doi:10.1016/j.cell.2023.08.021. PMC 10578497. PMID 37729908..
- Walker, LC; Jucker, M (2024). "The prion principle and Alzheimer's disease". Science. 385: 1278–1279. doi:10.1126/science.adq5252. PMC 11492928. PMID 39298592..

Complete List of Published Work: https://scholar.google.com/scholar?hl=en&as_sdt=0%2C11&q=mathias+jucker&oq=mathias

=== Books ===
- Alzheimer: 100 Years and Beyond (2006); M. Jucker, K. Beyreuther, C. Haass, R.M. Nitsch, Y. Christen, Eds. ISBN 978-3-540-37651-4
- Proteopathic Seeds and Neurodegenerative Diseases (2013); M. Jucker, Y. Christen, Eds. ISBN 978-3-642-35491-5
