= Amyloid plaques =

Extracellular deposits of the amyloid beta protein

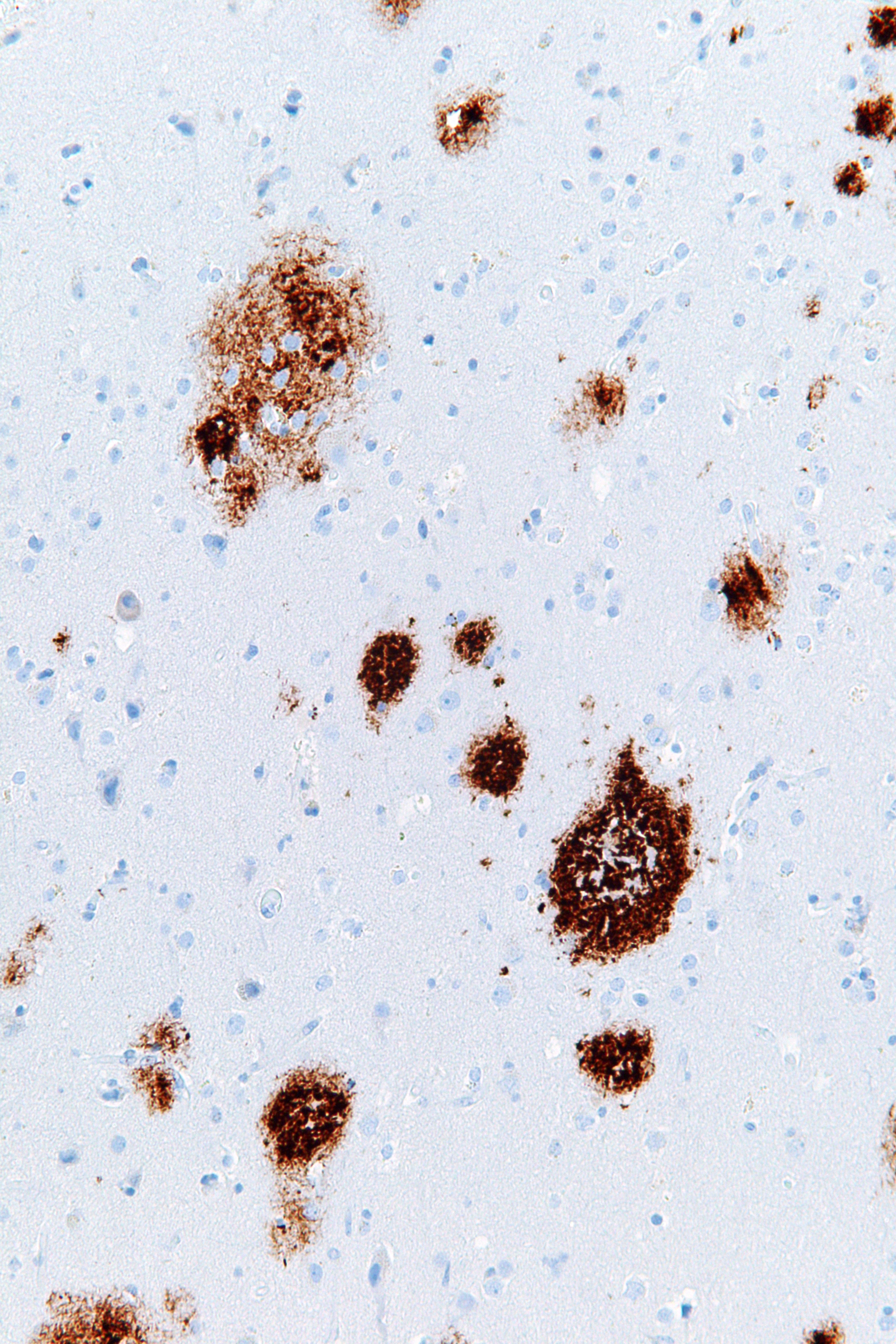
Amyloid beta immunostaining showing amyloid plaques (brown)

Amyloid plaques (also known as neuritic plaques, amyloid beta plaques or senile plaques) are extracellular deposits of amyloid, consisting of amyloid beta (Aβ) protein, that present mainly in the grey matter of the brain in humans and other primates. Degenerative neuronal elements and an abundance of microglia and astrocytes can be associated with amyloid plaques. Some plaques occur in the brain as a result of aging, but large numbers of plaques and neurofibrillary tangles are characteristic features of Alzheimer's disease.

The plaques are highly variable in shape and size; in tissue sections immunostained for Aβ, they comprise a log-normal size distribution curve, with an average plaque area of 400–450 square micrometers (μm^{2}). The smallest plaques (less than 200 μm^{2}), which often consist of diffuse deposits of Aβ, are particularly numerous. Plaques form when Aβ misfolds and aggregates into oligomers and longer polymers, the latter of which are characteristic of amyloid.

== History ==
In 1892, Paul Blocq and Gheorghe Marinescu first described the presence of plaques in grey matter. They referred to the plaques as 'nodules of neuroglial sclerosis'. In 1898, Emil Redlich reported plaques in three patients, two of whom had clinically verified dementia. Redlich used the term 'miliary sclerosis' to describe plaques because he thought they resembled millet seeds, and he was the first to refer to the lesions as 'plaques'.

In the early 20th century, Oskar Fischer noted their similarity to actinomyces 'Drusen' (geode-like lesions), leading him to call the degenerative process 'drusige Nekrose'. Alois Alzheimer is often credited with first linking plaques to dementia in a 1906 presentation (published in 1907), but this short report focused mainly on neurofibrillary tangles, and plaques were only briefly mentioned. Alzheimer's first substantive description of plaques appeared in 1911. In contrast, Oskar Fischer published a series of comprehensive investigations of plaques and dementia in 1907, 1910 and 1912. By 1911, Max Bielschowsky proposed the amyloid-nature of plaque deposits. This was later confirmed by Paul Divry, who showed that plaques that are stained with the dye Congo Red show the optical property of birefringence, which is characteristic of amyloids in general.

In 1911, Teofil Simchowicz introduced the term 'senile plaques' to denote their frequent presence in the brains of older individuals. In 1968, a quantitative analysis confirmed the association of senile plaques with dementia. The term 'neuritic plaques' was used in 1973 to designate plaques that include abnormal neuronal processes (neurites). An advance in 1984 and 1985 was the identification of Aβ as the protein that forms the cores of plaques. This discovery led to the generation of new tools to study plaques, particularly antibodies to Aβ, and presented a molecular target for the development of potential therapies for Alzheimer's disease.

== Amyloid beta generation ==
Amyloid beta (Aβ) is a small protein, most often 40 or 42 amino acids in length, that is released from a longer parent protein called the Aβ-precursor protein (APP). APP is produced by many types of cell in the body, but it is especially abundant in neurons. It is a single-pass transmembrane protein, passing once through cellular membranes.

The Aβ segment of APP is partly within the membrane and partly outside of the membrane. To liberate Aβ, APP is sequentially cleaved by two enzymes: first, by beta secretase (or β-amyloid cleaving enzyme (BACE)) outside the membrane, and second, by gamma secretase (γ-secretase), an enzyme complex within the membrane. The sequential actions of these secretases results in Aβ protein fragments that are released into the extracellular space. In addition to Aβ peptides that are 40 or 42 amino acids long, several less abundant Aβ fragments also are generated. Aβ can be chemically modified in various ways, and the length of the protein and chemical modifications can influence both its tendency to aggregate and its toxicity.

== Identification ==
Two amyloid plaques from the brain of a patient with Alzheimer's disease. In this photomicrograph, neurites are darkly stained with the Naoumenko-Feigin silver method, and the pink elements (including the plaque cores) are stained with the periodic acid-Schiff (PAS) counterstain. The bar is 20 microns (0.02 mm) in length.

Amyloid plaques are visible with the light microscope using a variety of staining techniques, including silver stains, Congo red, Thioflavin, cresyl violet, PAS-reaction, and luminescent conjugated oligothiophenes (LCOs). These methods often stain different components of the plaques, and they vary in their sensitivity Plaques may also be visualized immunohistochemically with antibodies directed against Aβ or other components of the lesions. Immunohistochemical stains are especially useful because they are both sensitive and specific for antigens that are associated with plaques.

== Composition ==
The Aβ deposits that comprise amyloid plaques are variable in size and appearance. Under the light microscope, they range from small, wispy accumulations that are a few microns in diameter to much larger dense or diffuse masses. So-called 'classical plaques' consist of a compact Aβ-amyloid core that is surrounded by a corona of somewhat less densely packed Aβ. Classical plaques also include abnormal, swollen neuronal processes (neurites) deriving from many different types of neurons, along with activated astrocytes and microglia. Abnormal neurites and activated glial cells are not typical of most diffuse plaques, and it has been suggested that diffuse deposits are an early stage in the development of plaques.

== Anatomical distribution ==
Dietmar Thal and his colleagues have proposed a sequence of stages of plaque formation in the brains of Alzheimer patients. In Phase 1, plaques appear in the neocortex; in Phase 2, they appear in the allocortex, hippocampal formation and amygdala; in Phase 3, the basal ganglia and diencephalon are affected; in Phase 4, plaques appear in the midbrain and medulla oblongata; and in Phase 5, they appear in the pons and cerebellum. Thus, in end-stage Alzheimer's disease, plaques can be found in most parts of the brain. They are uncommon in the spinal cord.

== Formation and spread ==
The normal function of Aβ is not certain, but plaques arise when the protein misfolds and begins to accumulate in the brain by a process of molecular templating ('seeding'). Mathias Jucker and Lary Walker have likened this process to the formation and spread of prions in diseases known as spongiform encephalopathies or prion diseases. According to the prion paradigm, certain proteins misfold into shapes that are rich in beta-sheet secondary structure.

== Involvement in disease ==
Abundant Aβ plaques, along with neurofibrillary tangles consisting of aggregated tau protein, are the two lesions that are required for the neuropathological diagnosis of Alzheimer's disease. Although the number of neurofibrillary tangles correlates more strongly with the degree of dementia than does the number of plaques, genetic and pathological findings indicate that Aβ plays a central role in the risk, onset, and progression of Alzheimer's disease.

The diagnosis of Alzheimer's disease typically requires a microscopic analysis of plaques and tangles in brain tissue, usually at autopsy. However, Aβ plaques (along with cerebral Aβ-amyloid angiopathy) can be detected in the brains of living subjects by preparing radiolabeled agents that bind selectively to Aβ deposits in the brain after being infused into the blood. The ligands cross the blood–brain barrier and attach to aggregated Aβ, and their retention in the brain is assessed by positron emission tomography. In addition, the presence of plaques and tangles can be estimated by measuring the amounts of the Aβ and tau proteins in the cerebrospinal fluid.

== Occurrence ==
The probability of having plaques in the brain increases with advancing age. From the age of 60 years (10%) to the age of 80 years (60%), the proportion of people with senile plaques increases linearly. Women are slightly more likely to have plaques than are men. Both plaques and Alzheimer's disease also are more common in aging persons with trisomy-21 (Down syndrome). This is thought to result from the excess production of Aβ because the APP gene is on chromosome 21, which exists as three copies in Down syndrome.

Amyloid plaques naturally occur in the aging brains of animal species ranging from birds to great apes. They have been found in all nonhuman primates examined thus far. Neurofibrillary tangles are rare, however, and no nonhuman species has been shown to have dementia along with the complete neuropathology of Alzheimer's disease.

== Research ==
Both human samples and experimental models of Alzheimer's disease have been used to study the biochemical, cytological, and inflammatory characteristics of amyloid plaques. Experimental studies have focused not only on delineating mechanisms by which plaques arise and proliferate, but also on discovering methods by which they can be detected (and potentially prevented/removed) in the living brain. However, several aspects of amyloid biology are still under investigation.

== See also ==
- Prion
- Proteopathy
