= ADAM (protein) =

Disintegrin and metalloproteinase domain-containing proteins

Identifiers
- Symbol: ADAM
- Pfam: PF08516
- InterPro: IPR027053
- Membranome: 538
Available protein structures:
- PDB: IPR027053 PF08516 (ECOD; PDBsum)
- AlphaFold: IPR027053; PF08516

Diagram of an ectodomain shedding ADAM metalloprotease.

ADAMs (short for a disintegrin and metalloproteinase) are a family of single-pass transmembrane and secreted metalloendopeptidases. All ADAMs are characterized by a particular domain organization featuring a pro-domain, a metalloprotease, a disintegrin, a cysteine-rich, an epidermal-growth factor like and a transmembrane domain, as well as a C-terminal cytoplasmic tail. Nonetheless, not all human ADAMs have a functional protease domain, which indicates that their biological function mainly depends on protein–protein interactions. Those ADAMs which are active proteases are classified as sheddases because they cut off or shed extracellular portions of transmembrane proteins. For example, ADAM10 can cut off part of the HER2 receptor, thereby activating it. ADAM genes are found in animals, choanoflagellates, fungi and some groups of green algae. Most green algae and all land plants probably had ADAM proteins but lost them.

ADAMs are categorized under the EC 3.4.24.46 enzyme group, and in the MEROPS peptidase family M12B. The terms adamalysin and MDC family (metalloproteinase-like, disintegrin-like, cysteine rich) have been used to refer to this family historically.

== ADAM family members ==
Protein	Description
ADAM1	ADAM1 (fertilin α) is a subunit of an integral sperm membrane heterodimeric glycoprotein called fertilin, which plays an important role in sperm-egg interactions.
ADAM2	ADAM2 (fertilin β) is a subunit of an integral sperm membrane heterodimeric glycoprotein called fertilin, which plays an important role in sperm-egg interactions.
ADAM7	ADAM7 is a transmembrane protein important for the maturation of sperm cells in mammals. ADAM7 is also denoted as: ADAM_7, ADAM-7, EAPI, GP-83, and GP83.
ADAM8	The ADAM8 protein encoded by this gene may be involved in cell adhesion during neurodegeneration.
ADAM9	The ADAM9 protein encoded by this gene interacts with SH3 domain-containing proteins, binds mitotic arrest deficient 2 beta protein, and is also involved in TPA-induced ectodomain shedding of membrane-anchored heparin-binding EGF-like growth factor.
ADAM10	ADAM10 (EC#: 3.4.24.81) is a sheddase, and has a broad specificity for peptide hydrolysis reactions.
ADAM11	The ADAM11 gene represents a candidate tumor suppressor gene for human breast cancer based on its location within a minimal region of chromosome 17q21 previously defined by tumor deletion mapping.
ADAM12	ADAM12, a metalloprotease that binds insulin growth factor binding protein-3 (IGFBP-3), appears to be an effective early Down syndrome marker.
ADAM15	Through its disintegrin-like domain, this protein specifically interacts with the integrin beta chain, beta 3. It also interacts with Src family protein–tyrosine kinases in a phosphorylation-dependent manner, suggesting that this protein may function in cell-cell adhesion as well as in cellular signaling.
ADAM17	ADAM17 is understood to be involved in the processing of tumor necrosis factor alpha (TNF-α) at the surface of the cell, and from within the intracellular membranes of the trans-Golgi network. ADAM17 also has a role in the shedding of L-selectin, a cellular adhesion molecule.
ADAM18	The protein encoded by this gene is a sperm surface protein. Synonymous with ADAM27.
ADAM19	This member is a type I transmembrane protein and serves as a marker for dendritic cell differentiation. It has also been demonstrated to be an active metalloproteinase, which may be involved in normal physiological and pathological processes such as cells migration, cell adhesion, cell-cell and cell-matrix interactions, and signal transduction.
ADAM20	Exclusively expressed in the testes.
ADAM21	Note: Synonymous with ADAM31.
ADAM22	This gene is highly expressed in the brain and may function as an integrin ligand in the brain.
ADAM23	This gene is highly expressed in the brain and may function as an integrin ligand in the brain.
ADAM28	The protein encoded by this gene is a lymphocyte-expressed ADAM protein.
ADAM29	
ADAM30	
ADAM33	This protein is a type I transmembrane protein implicated in asthma and bronchial hyperresponsiveness.

== Medicine ==
Therapeutic ADAM inhibitors might potentiate anti-cancer therapy.

== See also ==
- ADAMTS (A disintegrin and metalloproteinase with thrombospondin motifs) family
- Ectodomain shedding
