= Alpha secretase =

Family of proteolytic enzymes

Alpha secretases are a family of proteolytic enzymes that cleave amyloid precursor protein (APP) in its transmembrane region. Specifically, alpha secretases cleave within the fragment that gives rise to the Alzheimer's disease-associated peptide amyloid beta when APP is instead processed by beta secretase and gamma secretase. The alpha-secretase pathway is the predominant APP processing pathway. Thus, alpha-secretase cleavage precludes amyloid beta formation and is considered to be part of the non-amyloidogenic pathway in APP processing. Alpha secretases are members of the ADAM ('a disintegrin and metalloprotease domain') family, which are expressed on the surfaces of cells and anchored in the cell membrane. Several such proteins, notably ADAM10, have been identified as possessing alpha-secretase activity. Upon cleavage by alpha secretases, APP releases its extracellular domain - a fragment known as APPsα - into the extracellular environment in a process known as ectodomain shedding.

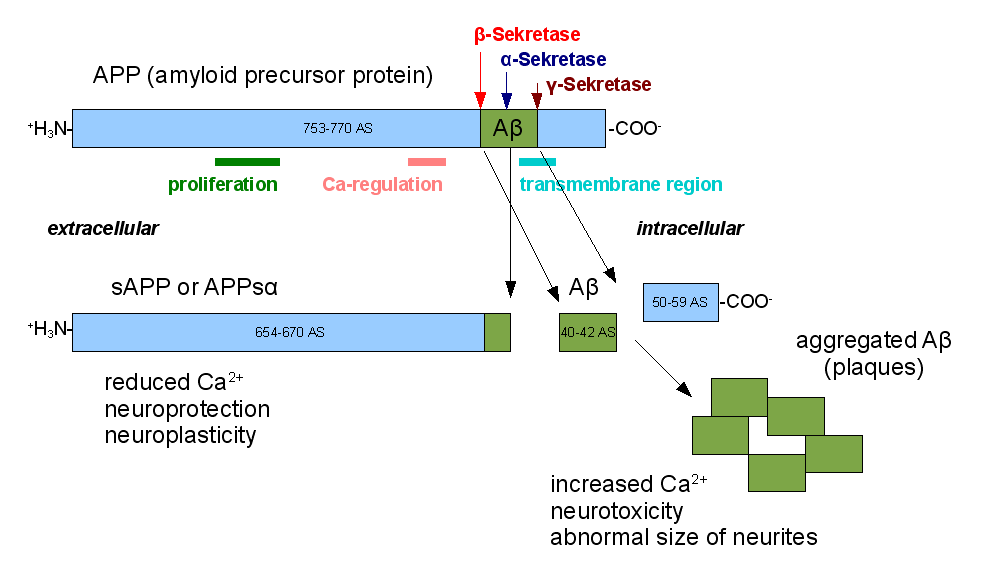
Cleavage of APP via alpha, beta and gamma secretase; defined functions on APP are coloured

ADAM10 consists of two protein domains, a disintegrin domain and a prodomain; however, only the prodomain is required for APP processing. Other ADAM proteins, ADAM17 (also called TACE, tumor necrosis factor-α converting enzyme), ADAM9, and ADAM19 have also been identified as alpha secretases; extracellular expression of mutant ADAM9 (also known as MDC9 or meltrin gamma) lacking the membrane anchor domain has been suggested as one of many possible means of Alzheimer's prevention and treatment exploiting the alpha secretase pathway. Two distinct modalities of alpha-secretase activity have been observed in cells; constitutive activity occurs mainly at the cell surface and is independent of regulatory mechanisms inside the cell, while regulated activity occurs mainly in the golgi and is dependent on the activity of protein kinase C. Alpha-secretase activity in the golgi is thought to compete directly with the beta-secretase pathway for APP substrates during membrane protein maturation. Cell-surface cleavage by alpha secretase is very rapid after APP reaches the cell surface.

The activity of alpha secretases has been implicated in the regulation of learning and memory formation. Release of the APPsα ectodomain has neurotrophic effects that counteract apoptotic signaling and promote synapse formation, processes that are upregulated when ADAM10 is overexpressed. Alpha secretase activity has also been observed to be upregulated in response to the signaling peptide PACAP.

Related alpha-secretases, including ADAM10, have also been implicated in similar maturation events for other transmembrane proteins such as MHC class I proteins. Recent evidence suggests that some such proteins are first processed to ectodomains by alpha secretases and subsequently cleaved by another Alzheimer's-associated protease complex, gamma secretase in its presenilin-complexed form. The Notch pathway bears many similarities to APP processing and is also regulated in part by ADAM10.
