= ADAM7 =

Protein-coding gene in humans

Identifiers
- Aliases: ADAM7, ADAM 7, ADAM-7, EAPI, GP-83, GP83, ADAM metallopeptidase domain 7
- External IDs: OMIM: 607310; MGI: 107247; GeneCards: ADAM7

Gene location (Human)
Chr.	Chromosome 8 (human)
Band	8p21.2	Start	24,440,930 bp
Band	8p21.2	End	24,526,970 bp

Gene location (Mouse)
Chr.	Chromosome 14 (mouse)
Band	14|14 D1	Start	68,734,785 bp
Band	14|14 D1	End	68,771,190 bp
RNA expression pattern
Bgee	Human / Mouse (ortholog); Top expressed in: corpus epididymis; tail of epididymis; testicle; caput epididymis; seminal vesicula; left testis; right testis; body of pancreas; male germ cell; gonad / Top expressed in: zygote; retinal pigment epithelium; secondary oocyte; primary oocyte; Epithelium of choroid plexus; lobe of prostate; genital tubercle; dorsal striatum; white adipose tissue; cornea; More reference expression data
BioGPS	n/a
Gene ontology
Molecular function	metallopeptidase activity; metalloendopeptidase activity; endopeptidase activity
Cellular component	plasma membrane; membrane; integral component of membrane
Biological process	proteolysis
Sources:Amigo / QuickGO
Orthologs
Databases	NCBI: entry; OMA: entry
Species	Human	Mouse
Entrez	8756	11500
Ensembl	ENSG00000069206	ENSMUSG00000022056
UniProt	Q9H2U9	O35227
RefSeq (mRNA)	NM_003817	NM_007402
RefSeq (protein)	NP_003808	NP_031428
Location (UCSC)	Chr 8: 24.44 – 24.53 Mb	Chr 14: 68.73 – 68.77 Mb
PubMed search
- Wikidata
View/Edit Human	View/Edit Mouse

Disintegrin and metalloproteinase domain-containing protein 7 is a protein that in humans is encoded by the ADAM7 gene. ADAM7 is an 85-kDa enzyme that is a member of the transmembrane ADAM (A Disintegrin and Metalloprotease) protein family. Members of this family are membrane-anchored proteins structurally related to snake venom disintegrins, and have been implicated in a variety of biological processes involving cell-cell and cell-matrix interactions, including fertilization, muscle development, and neurogenesis. ADAM7 is important for the maturation of sperm cells in mammals. ADAM7 is also denoted as: ADAM_7, ADAM-7, EAPI, GP-83, and GP83.

== Tissue distribution ==
ADAM7 expression is localized in mammalian epididymis cells. Expression of ADAM7 is higher in the head (Caput) of the epididymis and decreases in cells towards the distal epididymis. ADAM7 is also present in mature sperm cell membranes of mice. Thus, ADAM7 is synthesized in the epididymis and transferred to the maturing sperm cell membrane. mRNA transcripts are highly expressed in testes leydig cells as well.

== Structure ==
Human ADAM7 contains a sequence of 756 amino acids. Numerous mammalian orthologs are currently known. The largest portion of ADAM7 resides in the extracellular space. A short helical transmembrane sequence anchors the sequence while a short cytoplasmic sequence exists. This is consistent and expected as the protein has a secretory function.

== Function ==
The functions of ADAM7 directly relate to sperm maturation and fertilization. Sperm are immobile until traversing the epididymis, in which the sperm interact with many proteins secreted by epithelial cells of the epididymis. Lacking protease activity, ADAM7 may play roles in protein-protein interactions and cell adhesion processes including sperm-egg fusion. ADAM7 is secreted by epididymis cells and transferred to the maturing sperm's surface. As determined through mouse gene knock-out studies, the amount of ADAM7 secreted is directly linked to ADAM2 and ADAM3 protein levels. Complex formation between ADAM7, Calnexin, Hspa5, and Itm2b have been shown to act as a molecular chaperone after ADAM7 is incorporated into the membrane of sperm cells. Furthermore, complex formation with Itm2b is increased during sperm capacitation leading to a conformation change in ADAM7. As such, the ADAM7 protein plays an important function involved in sperm capacitation, although this function is not entirely understood.

== Mechanism of secretion and membrane transfer ==
ADAM7 is synthesized in epididymis cells and transferred to the membrane of immature sperm cells as they traverse the epididymis during sperm maturation. Epithelial cells of the epididymis incorporate ADAM7 into their membrane normally like other integral membrane protein. Portions of the membrane are secreted as exosome vesicles. Secretion in this manner is an apocrine secretion in which apical blebs containing a portion of the epididymis cell are released from the cell. The apical blebs then encounter the immature sperm cell membrane within the convoluted tubules of the epididymis. The apical bleb and immature sperm cell membrane then fuse, ultimately incorporating ADAM7 into the sperm cell membrane.

== Model Organisms ==
Due to the large mammalian homology, ADAM7 is primarily studied in Mus Musculus.
