= ADAM10 =

Protein found in humans

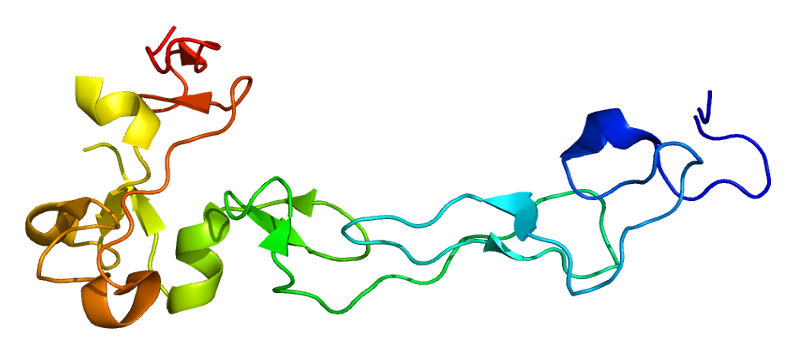

Identifiers
- Aliases: ADAM10, AD10, AD18, CD156c, HsT18717, MADM, RAK, kuz, CDw156, ADAM metallopeptidase domain 10
- External IDs: OMIM: 602192; MGI: 109548; GeneCards: ADAM10
Available structures
| PDB | Ortholog search: PDBe RCSB |
| PDB | List of PDB id codes 1M1I |
Enzyme activity
| EC # | BRENDA | ExPASy | KEGG | MetaCyc |
|---|---|---|---|---|
| 3.4.24.81 | ↗ | ↗ | ↗ | ↗ |

Gene location (Human)
| Chr. | Chromosome 15 (human) |
| Band | 15q21.3 | Start | 58,588,809 bp |
| Band | 15q21.3 | End | 58,749,791 bp |

Gene location (Mouse)
| Chr. | Chromosome 9 (mouse) |
| Band | 9 D|9 39.53 cM | Start | 70,586,279 bp |
| Band | 9 D|9 39.53 cM | End | 70,687,511 bp |
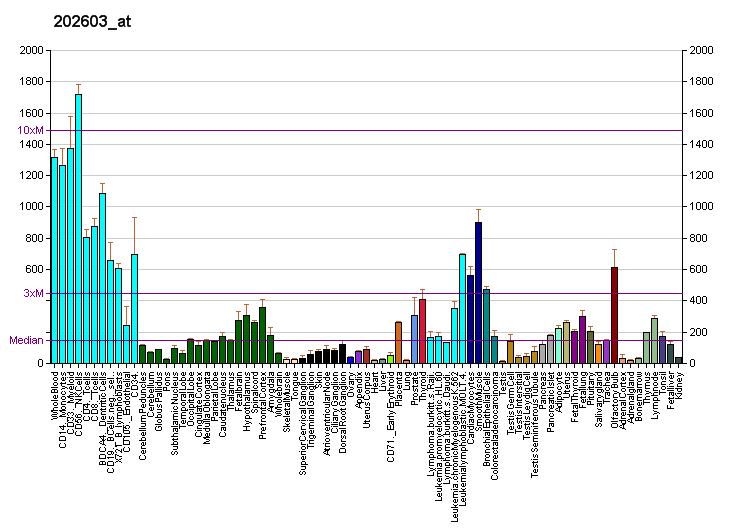

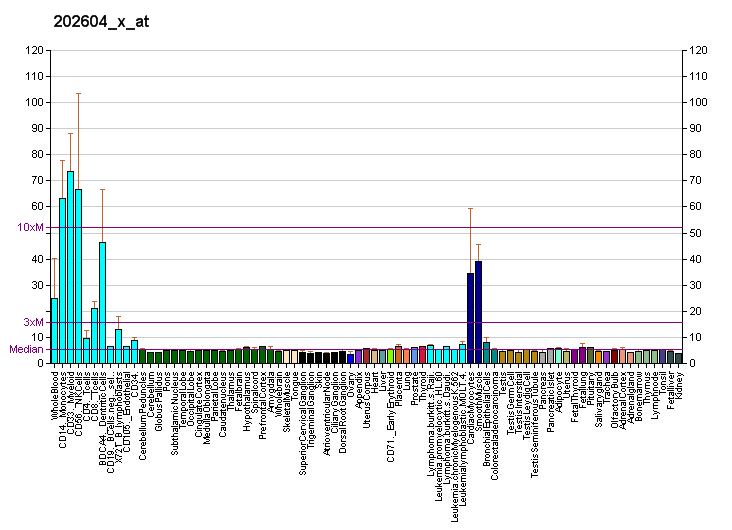

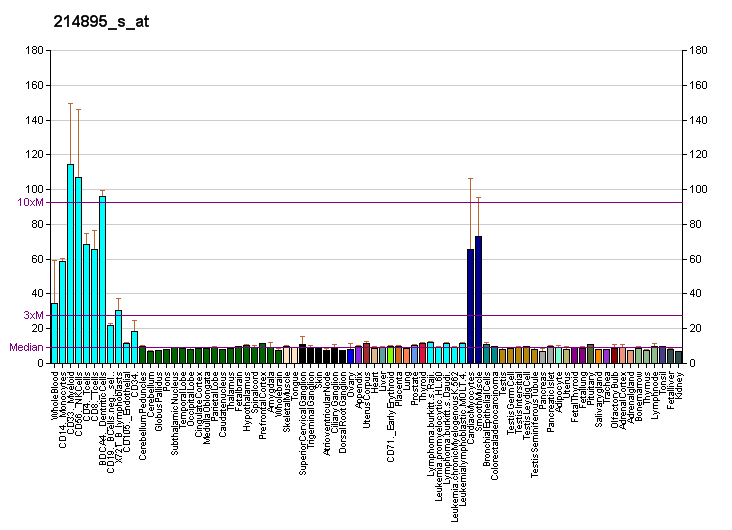
RNA expression pattern
| Bgee | Human / Mouse (ortholog); Top expressed in: stromal cell of endometrium; amniotic fluid; visceral pleura; trigeminal ganglion; monocyte; oocyte; olfactory bulb; placenta; epithelium of colon; bone marrow cell / Top expressed in: cumulus cell; atrioventricular valve; decidua; atrium; mucous cell of stomach; Gonadal ridge; molar; left lung lobe; urothelium; iris; More reference expression data |
| BioGPS | More reference expression data |
Gene ontology
| Molecular function | protein homodimerization activity; SH3 domain binding; endopeptidase activity; metal ion binding; integrin binding; peptidase activity; protein binding; signaling receptor binding; hydrolase activity; protein kinase binding; metallopeptidase activity; metalloendopeptidase activity |
| Cellular component | cytoplasm; integral component of membrane; membrane; postsynaptic density; focal adhesion; plasma membrane; perinuclear endoplasmic reticulum; Golgi-associated vesicle; tetraspanin-enriched microdomain; extracellular exosome; nucleus; cell surface; Golgi membrane; extracellular space; Golgi apparatus; specific granule membrane; tertiary granule membrane; endoplasmic reticulum lumen; trans-Golgi network; synaptic vesicle; dendrite; soma; dendritic spine; postsynaptic membrane; postsynapse; glutamatergic synapse |
| Biological process | Notch signaling pathway; positive regulation of cell migration; ephrin receptor signaling pathway; cell-cell signaling; constitutive protein ectodomain proteolysis; protein processing; extracellular matrix disassembly; in utero embryonic development; proteolysis; monocyte activation; response to tumor necrosis factor; protein phosphorylation; positive regulation of cell growth; positive regulation of T cell chemotaxis; positive regulation of cell population proliferation; Notch receptor processing; integrin-mediated signaling pathway; membrane protein ectodomain proteolysis; negative regulation of cell adhesion; neutrophil degranulation; post-translational protein modification; spermatogenesis; amyloid-beta formation; Notch receptor processing, ligand-dependent; positive regulation of apoptotic process; regulation of dendritic spine morphogenesis; response to antineoplastic agent; regulation of neurotransmitter receptor localization to postsynaptic specialization membrane; postsynapse organization |
Sources:Amigo / QuickGO
Orthologs
| Databases | NCBI: entry; OMA: entry |
| Species | Human | Mouse |
| Entrez | 102 | 11487 |
| Ensembl | ENSG00000137845 | ENSMUSG00000054693 |
| UniProt | O14672 | O35598 |
| RefSeq (mRNA) | NM_001110; NM_001320570 | NM_007399 |
| RefSeq (protein) | NP_001101; NP_001307499; NP_001101.1 | NP_031425 |
| Location (UCSC) | Chr 15: 58.59 – 58.75 Mb | Chr 9: 70.59 – 70.69 Mb |
| PubMed search |
- Wikidata
| View/Edit Human | View/Edit Mouse |

ADAM10 endopeptidase

Identifiers
- EC no.: 3.4.24.81
- CAS no.: 193099-09-1

Databases
- BRENDA: enzyme data
- ExPASy: NiceZyme view
- KEGG: enzyme entry
- MetaCyc: metabolic pathway
- Rhea: reactions
- PDB structures: RCSB PDB PDBe PDBsum
Search
- PMC: articles
- PubMed: articles
- NCBI: proteins

A Disintegrin and metalloproteinase domain-containing protein 10, also known as ADAM10 or CDw156 or CD156c, is a protein that in humans is encoded by the ADAM10 gene.

== Function ==
Members of the ADAM family are cell surface proteins with a unique structure, possessing both potential adhesion and protease domains. Sheddase, a generic name for the ADAM metallopeptidase, functions primarily to cleave membrane proteins at the cellular surface. Once cleaved, the sheddases release soluble ectodomains with an altered location and function.

Although a single sheddase may "shed" a variety of substances, multiple sheddases can cleave the same substrate resulting in different consequences. This gene encodes an ADAM family member that cleaves many proteins including TNF-alpha and E-cadherin.

ADAM10 (EC#: 3.4.24.81) is a sheddase, and has a broad specificity for peptide hydrolysis reactions.

ADAM10 cleaves ephrin, within the ephrin/eph complex, formed between two cell surfaces. When ephrin is freed from the opposing cell, the entire ephrin/eph complex is endocytosed. This shedding in trans had not been previously shown, but may well be involved in other shedding events.

In neurons, ADAM10 is the most important enzyme, with α-secretase activity for proteolytic processing of the amyloid precursor protein. ADAM10, along with ADAM17, cleaves the ectodomain of the triggering receptor expressed on myeloid cells 2 (TREM2), to produce soluble TREM2 (sTREM2), which has been proposed as a CSF and sera biomarker of neurodegeneration.

ADAM10 belongs to subfamily A, the most ancestral subfamily of ADAM proteins, which is shared by all major groups of animals, choanoflagellates, fungi, and green algae from the class Mamiellophyceae.

== Structure ==
Although no crystallographic x-ray diffraction analyses have been published that depict the entire structure of ADAM10, one domain has been studied using this technique. The disintegrin and cysteine-rich domain (shown to the right) plays an essential role in regulation of protease activity in vivo. Recent experimental evidence suggests that this region, which is distinct from the active site, may be responsible for substrate specificity of the enzyme. It is proposed that this domain binds to particular regions of the enzyme's substrate, allowing peptide bond hydrolysis to occur in well defined locations on certain substrate proteins.

The proposed active site of ADAM10 has been identified by sequence analysis, and is identical to enzymes in the Snake Venom metalloprotein domain family. The consensus sequence for catalytically active ADAM proteins is HEXGHNLGXXHD. Structural analysis of ADAM17, which has the same active site sequence as ADAM10, suggests that the three histidines in this sequence bind a Zn^{2+} atom, and that the glutamate is the catalytic residue.

== Catalytic mechanism ==
Although the exact mechanism of ADAM10 has not been thoroughly investigated, its active site is homologous to those of well studied zinc-proteases such as carboxypeptidase A and thermolysin. Therefore, it is proposed that ADAM10 utilizes a similar mechanism as these enzymes. In zinc proteases, the key catalytic elements have been identified as a glutamate residue and a Zn^{2+} ion coordinated to histidine residues.

The proposed mechanism begins with deprotonation of a water molecule by glutamate. The resultant hydroxide initiates a nucleophilic attack on a carbonyl carbon on the peptide backbone, producing a tetrahedral intermediate. This step is facilitated by electron withdrawal from oxygen by Zn^{2+} and by zinc's subsequent stabilization of the negative charge on the oxygen atom in the intermediate state. As electrons move down from the oxygen atom to re-form the double bond, the tetrahedral intermediate collapses to products with protonation of -NH by the glutamate residue.

== Clinical significance ==
=== Brain diseases ===
ADAM10 plays a key role in the modulation of the molecular mechanisms responsible for dendritic spine formation, maturation and stabilization and in the regulation of the molecular organization of the glutamatergic synapse. Consequently, an alteration of ADAM10 activity is strictly correlated to the onset of different types of synaptopathies, ranging from neurodevelopmental disorders, i.e. autism spectrum disorders, to neurodegenerative diseases, i.e. Alzheimer's Disease.

=== Malaria ===
A number of different proteins on the surface of Plasmodium falciparum malaria parasites help the invaders bind to red blood cells. But once attached to host blood cells, the parasites need to shed the 'sticky' surface proteins that would otherwise interfere with entrance into the cell. The Sheddase enzyme, specifically called PfSUB2 in this example, is required for the parasites to invade cells; without it, the parasites die. The sheddase is stored in and released from cellular compartments near the tip of the parasite, according to the study. Once on the surface, the enzyme attaches to a motor that shuttles it from front to back, liberating the sticky surface proteins. With these proteins removed, the parasite gains entrance into a red blood cell. The entire invasion lasts about 30 seconds and without this ADAM metallopeptidase, malaria would be ineffective at invading the red blood cells.

=== Cancer ===
A 2020 study found that ADAM10 enhances the proliferation, migration, and invasion of osteosarcoma cells by modulating the E-cadherin/β-catenin signaling pathway, with miR-122-5p identified as a regulatory upstream target of ADAM10, suggesting that the miR-122-5p/ADAM10 axis may represent a potential therapeutic target for osteosarcoma.

==== Breast cancer ====
In combination with low doses of herceptin, selective ADAM10 inhibitors decrease proliferation in HER2 over-expressing cell lines while inhibitors, that do not inhibit ADAM10, have no impact. These results are consistent with ADAM10 being a major determinant of HER2 shedding, the inhibition of which, may provide a novel therapeutic approach for treating breast cancer and a variety of other cancers with active HER2 signaling.

The presence of the product of this gene in neuronal synapses in conjunction with protein AP2 has been seen in increased amounts in the hippocampal neurons of Alzheimer's disease patients.

== See also ==
- Cluster of differentiation
- ADAM 17 Metallopeptidase
- ADAM Protein
