= ADAM33 =

Protein-coding gene in humans

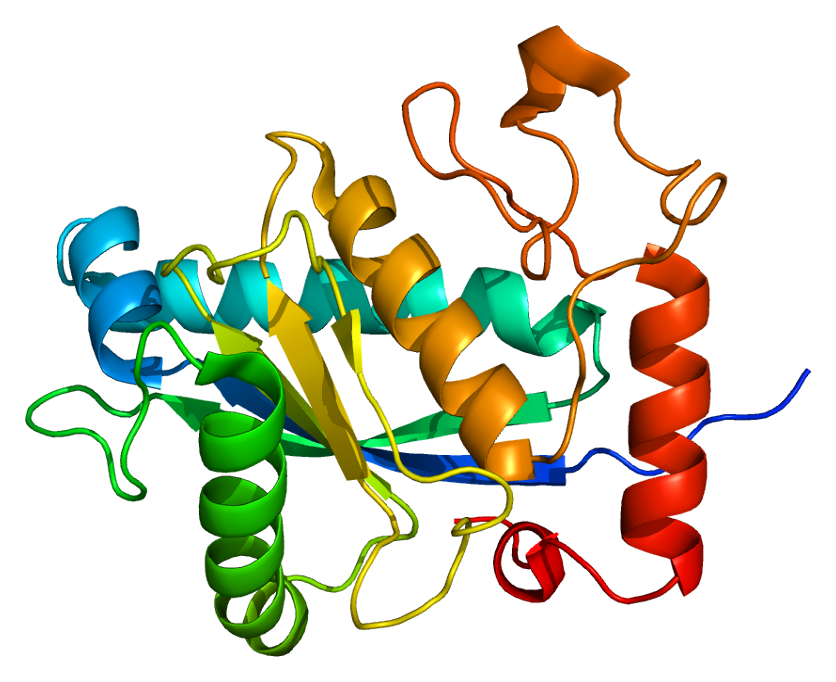

Identifiers
- Aliases: ADAM33, C20orf153, DJ964F7.1, ADAM metallopeptidase domain 33
- External IDs: OMIM: 607114; MGI: 1341813; GeneCards: ADAM33
Available structures
PDB	Ortholog search: PDBe RCSB
PDB	List of PDB id codes 1R54, 1R55

Gene location (Human)
Chr.	Chromosome 20 (human)
Band	20p13	Start	3,667,965 bp
Band	20p13	End	3,682,246 bp

Gene location (Mouse)
Chr.	Chromosome 2 (mouse)
Band	2 F1|2 63.26 cM	Start	130,892,511 bp
Band	2 F1|2 63.26 cM	End	130,905,734 bp
RNA expression pattern
Bgee	Human / Mouse (ortholog); Top expressed in: canal of the cervix; body of uterus; left uterine tube; stromal cell of endometrium; muscle layer of sigmoid colon; ectocervix; gastric mucosa; Descending thoracic aorta; ascending aorta; myometrium / Top expressed in: ascending aorta; aortic valve; lip; umbilical cord; sciatic nerve; dermis; tunica media of zone of aorta; muscle of thigh; embryo; superior frontal gyrus; More reference expression data
BioGPS	n/a
Gene ontology
Molecular function	peptidase activity; metalloendopeptidase activity; protein binding; hydrolase activity; metallopeptidase activity; metal ion binding; zinc ion binding
Cellular component	integral component of membrane; membrane
Biological process	proteolysis
Sources:Amigo / QuickGO
Orthologs
Databases	NCBI: entry; OMA: entry
Species	Human	Mouse
Entrez	80332	110751
Ensembl	ENSG00000149451	ENSMUSG00000027318
UniProt	Q9BZ11; Q08AM2	Q923W9
RefSeq (mRNA)	NM_001282447; NM_025220; NM_153202	NM_001163529; NM_033615
RefSeq (protein)	NP_001269376; NP_079496; NP_694882	NP_001157001; NP_291093
Location (UCSC)	Chr 20: 3.67 – 3.68 Mb	Chr 2: 130.89 – 130.91 Mb
PubMed search
- Wikidata
View/Edit Human	View/Edit Mouse

Disintegrin and metalloproteinase domain-containing protein 33 is an enzyme that in humans is encoded by the ADAM33 gene.

== Function ==
This gene encodes a member of the ADAM (a disintegrin and metalloprotease domain) family. Members of this family are membrane-anchored proteins structurally related to snake venom disintegrins, and have been implicated in a variety of biological processes involving cell-cell and cell-matrix interactions, including fertilization, muscle development, and neurogenesis. This protein is a type I transmembrane protein implicated in asthma and bronchial hyperresponsiveness. Alternative splicing of this gene results in two transcript variants encoding different isoforms.
