= P3 peptide =

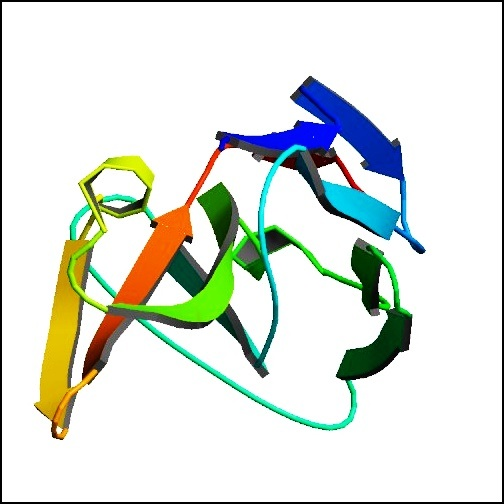
Representation of the 3D structure of p3 peptide.

p3 peptide also known as amyloid β- peptide (Aβ)_{17–40/42} is the peptide resulting from the α- and γ-secretase cleavage from the amyloid precursor protein (APP). It is known to be the major constituent of diffuse plaques observed in Alzheimer's disease (AD) brains and pre-amyloid plaques in people affected by Down syndrome. However, p3 peptide's role in these diseases is not truly known yet.

== Structure ==
There is little information related to the p3 peptides composition and structure, and moreover most of it has to do with characteristics that concern to its role in Alzheimer's disease. p3 can be found as a 24 or 26 residues peptide, depending on which is gamma secretase's cleavage. The peptide which has 26 residues, presents the following sequence:

- VFFAEDVGSNKGAIIGLMVGGVVIAT

In relation to the secondary structure of p3 peptide, it is thought that after the cleavage by the α- and γ- secretases and extraction from the membrane it would convert quickly from the α-helix conformation it has when it is part of APPsα sequence to a β-hairpin structure. Then, this highly hydrophobic monomer would rapidly evolve into fibrils with no soluble intermediate forms, the ones related to amyloid’s structure. The main reason why p3 does not aggregate in amyloidogenic forms while Aβ does, is that the N-terminal domain Aβ_{1–16}, which is present in Aβ’s sequence but not in p3's one, is known to protect the hydrophobic core of the oligomers from being dissolved by the watered medium. So, p3 peptide oligomers would likely expose hydrophobic residues to water and would be less stable. As a consequence, p3 peptide structural determinants can assemble into fibrils, but no oligomeric forms have been identified. That is why p3 peptide represents the benign form of amyloid.

== Properties ==
Energy plays a very important role in p3 peptides. While Aβ models have a strong negative energy, p3 oligomeric models have a positive one. Another characteristic that must be pointed out is that p3 peptides have more solvent-exposed hydrophobic surfaces (60%) than Aβ oligomers do (20%), so buried surface areas are not as big within p3 oligomers (30%) as they are within Aβ oligomers. These evidences show that the expected energy of the Aβ-based oligomeric models of p3 is always positive and that these models expose hydrophobic patches to the solvent and bury a small proportion of their accessible surface within the oligomeric intermediates. Having these facts into account, we can state that p3 oligomers' existence is thermodynamically unfavourable, which suggests that the p3 peptide cannot form stable soluble oligomers in the same way Aβ does. Solution of p3 cannot assemble into stable oligomers as Aβ_{1–42} in the same concentration does. Therefore, it is very possible that p3 could not last long by itself, evolving rapidly into fibrillar forms that hide exposed hydrophobic patches.

p3 peptides have been analyzed in some researches with Western blot techniques. Primary antibodies were used to recognize Aβ_{1–16} residues. Unexpectedly, it was discovered that the residues did not show any signal. This confirms the absence of N-terminal domain Aβ_{1-16} in p3 peptides.

== Synthesis ==
p3 peptide generates from the 17-40 or 17-42 sequence of the amyloid precursor protein (APP), which is a type I integral membrane protein concerned in neurons’ synapses in many human tissues. Under normal physiological conditions, APP is processed with three different proteolytic enzymes: α-, β- and γ-secretases. At first, APP molecule is cut by α-secretase or β-secretase, and it will produce two different molecules for each case. These products are respectively APPsα or α-CTFs, when cut by α-secretase, or APPsβ and β-CTFs, when processed by β secretase. APPs derivates are sent both to the extra-cell, while CTFs rest anchored to the plasmatic membrane. Then, α- and β-CTFs are processed by γ-secretase, resulting the peptides p3 and Aβ respectively and releasing in both cases a cytoplasmic peptide fragment known as the APP intracellular domain (AICD). Both p3 and Aβ are sent to the extracellular medium.

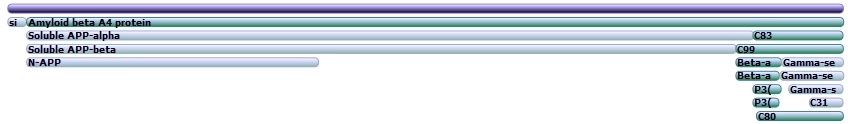
APP molecular processing and its different products. One of them is p3 peptide, which is sent to the extracellular medium.

== Role in Alzheimer’s disease and Down syndrome ==
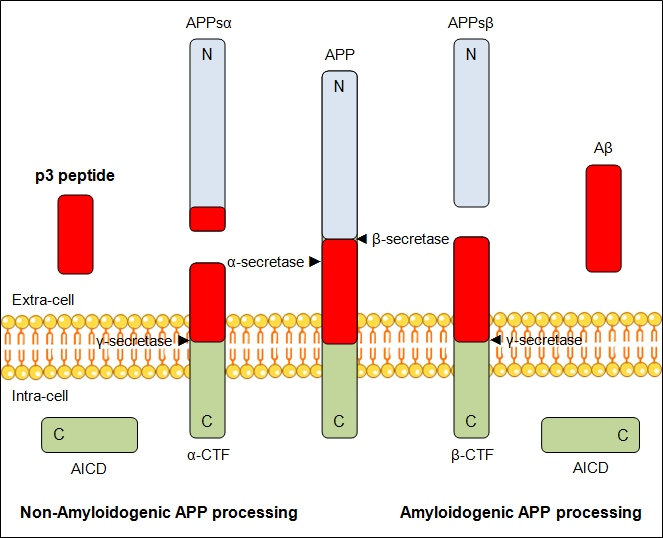
p3 peptide is a product of non-amyloidogenic APP processing.

p3 peptide is known to have a role in AD and DS, however it has not been clearly determined yet.

In order to study the function of p3 peptide in AD, specific antibodies’ location techniques have been used to determine its absence or sparseness in aged non-AD brains. As it turns out, p3 peptide is prevalent in selected areas of AD brain in diffuse deposits and in a subset of dystrophic neuritis, both located in the temporal lobe limbic system.

Although p3 peptide can assemble into fibrillar aggregates, its hydrophobic properties make it unable to rest in oligomeric forms. This might explain why p3 has no impact on synaptic function and therefore in AD, since it is a non-amyloidogenic product of APP.

Despite this fact, p3 has been proved to have a role in formation of non-fibrillar deposits or lesions associated with DS, another neurological disorder that progresses at a faster rate than AD. Accordingly, DS patients have three copies of the APP gene, as they have three copies of the chromosome 21, so APP is overexpressed in the brain and AD develops at an early age. The disruption of the normal function of APP in AD and, consequently, in DS, including overexpression or altered processes, is the most likely explanation for amyloid plaque formation and subsequent neuronal loss and dementia, associated to memory, spatial disorientation and deterioration of intellectual capacity.

Since p3 has not been studied deeply, there are different opinions about its role in brain.

P3 peptides are thought to have a role in neuronal death and in the enhanced inflammatory response in AD and DS, as it has been demonstrated that the treatment of cells with the p3 fragment, induced by the c-Jun N-terminal kinases (JNK) phosphorylation, is involved in neuronal cells apoptosis and causes the death of SH-SY5Y and IMR‐32 human neuroblastoma cells.
