= ADAM22 =

Enzyme found in humans

Identifiers
- Aliases: ADAM22, ADAM 22, MDC2, ADAM metallopeptidase domain 22, EIEE61, DEE61
- External IDs: OMIM: 603709; MGI: 1340046; GeneCards: ADAM22
Available structures
PDB	Ortholog search: PDBe RCSB
PDB	List of PDB id codes 3G5C

Gene location (Human)
Chr.	Chromosome 7 (human)
Band	7q21.12	Start	87,934,143 bp
Band	7q21.12	End	88,202,889 bp

Gene location (Mouse)
Chr.	Chromosome 5 (mouse)
Band	5 A1|5 3.39 cM	Start	8,122,352 bp
Band	5 A1|5 3.39 cM	End	8,418,160 bp
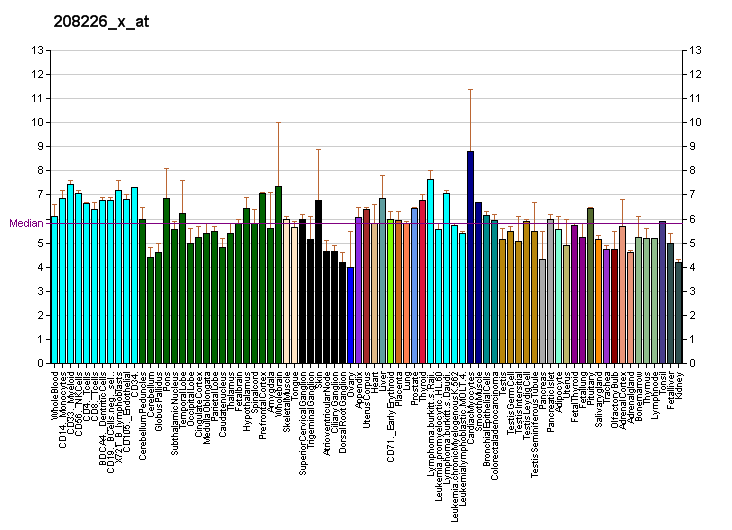

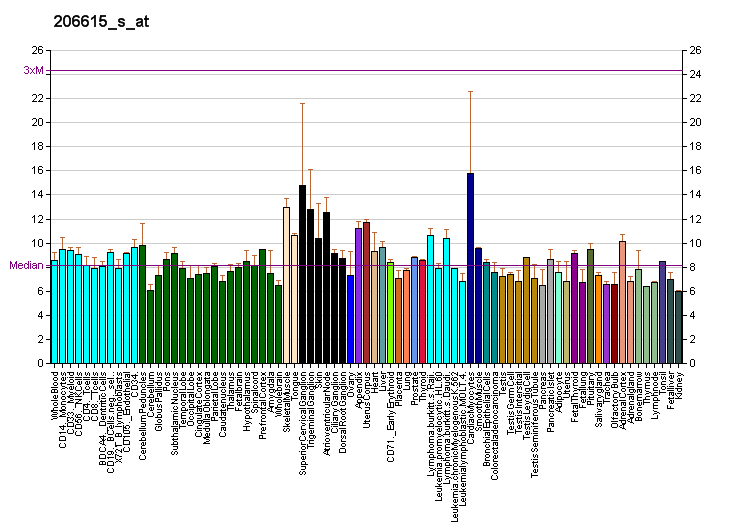

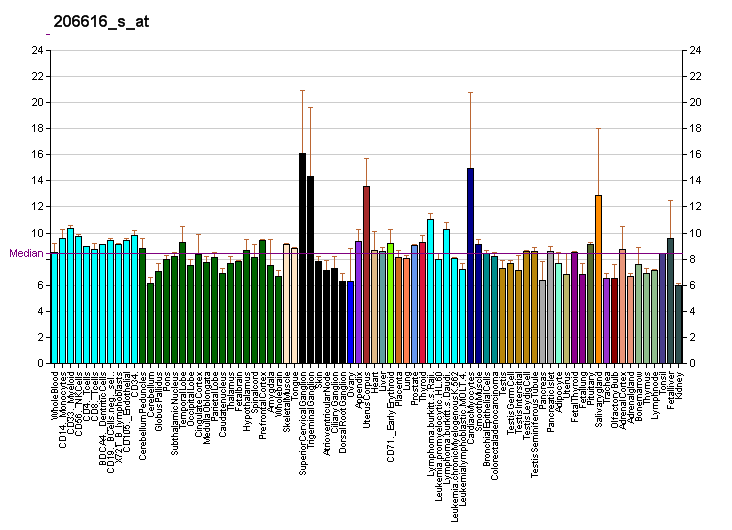
RNA expression pattern
Bgee	Human / Mouse (ortholog); Top expressed in: lateral nuclear group of thalamus; middle temporal gyrus; pons; Brodmann area 23; postcentral gyrus; orbitofrontal cortex; Brodmann area 46; cerebellum; cerebellar hemisphere; superior frontal gyrus / Top expressed in: lobe of cerebellum; cerebellar vermis; dorsal striatum; lateral septal nucleus; subiculum; anterior amygdaloid area; medial geniculate nucleus; nucleus accumbens; dorsomedial hypothalamic nucleus; ventromedial nucleus; More reference expression data
BioGPS	More reference expression data
Gene ontology
Molecular function	integrin binding; metalloendopeptidase activity; protein binding; metallopeptidase activity
Cellular component	integral component of membrane; axon; plasma membrane; cell projection; membrane; glutamatergic synapse; integral component of postsynaptic density membrane
Biological process	Schwann cell differentiation; adult locomotory behavior; negative regulation of cell adhesion; central nervous system development; cell adhesion; myelination in peripheral nervous system; proteolysis; gliogenesis
Sources:Amigo / QuickGO
Orthologs
Databases	NCBI: entry; OMA: entry
Species	Human	Mouse
Entrez	53616	11496
Ensembl	ENSG00000008277	ENSMUSG00000040537
UniProt	Q9P0K1	Q9R1V6
RefSeq (mRNA)	NM_004194; NM_016351; NM_021721; NM_021722; NM_021723 NM_001324417; NM_001324418; NM_001324419; NM_001324420; NM_001324421; NM_001391975; NM_001391976; NM_001391977; NM_001391978; NM_001391979; NM_001391980; NM_001391981; NM_001391982	NM_001007220; NM_001007221; NM_001098225; NM_001310439; NM_001310440
RefSeq (protein)	NP_001311346; NP_001311347; NP_001311348; NP_001311349; NP_001311350 NP_004185; NP_057435; NP_068367; NP_068368; NP_068369	NP_001007221; NP_001007222; NP_001091695; NP_001297368; NP_001297369
Location (UCSC)	Chr 7: 87.93 – 88.2 Mb	Chr 5: 8.12 – 8.42 Mb
PubMed search
- Wikidata
View/Edit Human	View/Edit Mouse

Disintegrin and metalloproteinase domain-containing protein 22, also known as ADAM22, is an enzyme that in humans is encoded by the ADAM22 gene.

== Function ==
ADAM22 is a member of the ADAM (A Disintegrin And Metalloprotease domain) family. Members of this family are membrane-anchored proteins structurally related to snake venom disintegrins, and have been implicated in a variety of biological processes involving cell-cell and cell-matrix interactions, including fertilization, muscle development, and neurogenesis. This gene is highly expressed in the brain and may function as an integrin ligand in the brain. Alternative splicing results in several transcript variants.

== Interactions ==
ADAM22 has been shown to interact with DLG4.
