= ADAM8 =

Protein-coding gene in humans

Identifiers
- Aliases: ADAM8, CD156, CD156a, MS2, ADAM metallopeptidase domain 8
- External IDs: OMIM: 602267; MGI: 107825; GeneCards: ADAM8
Available structures
| PDB | Ortholog search: PDBe RCSB |
| PDB | List of PDB id codes 4DD8 |

Gene location (Human)
| Chr. | Chromosome 10 (human) |
| Band | 10q26.3 | Start | 133,262,420 bp |
| Band | 10q26.3 | End | 133,276,868 bp |

Gene location (Mouse)
| Chr. | Chromosome 7 (mouse) |
| Band | 7|7 F4 | Start | 139,558,845 bp |
| Band | 7|7 F4 | End | 139,572,475 bp |
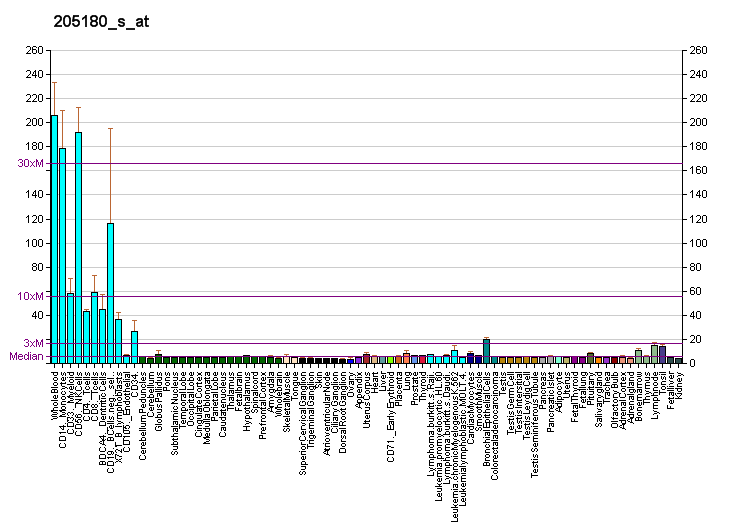

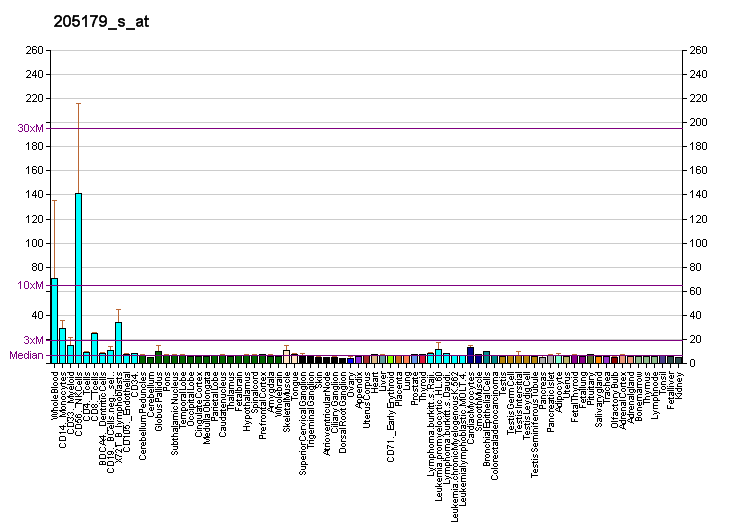
RNA expression pattern
| Bgee | Human / Mouse (ortholog); Top expressed in: granulocyte; blood; spleen; monocyte; bone marrow cell; pancreatic ductal cell; periodontal fiber; appendix; upper lobe of left lung; right lung / Top expressed in: granulocyte; stroma of bone marrow; decidua; trachea; calvaria; tibiofemoral joint; lumbar spinal ganglion; gastrula; vein; mesenteric lymph nodes; More reference expression data |
| BioGPS | More reference expression data |
Gene ontology
| Molecular function | metal ion binding; protein self-association; peptidase activity; protein binding; metalloendopeptidase activity; hydrolase activity; cell adhesion molecule binding; calcium ion binding; serine-type endopeptidase activity; metallopeptidase activity; zinc ion binding |
| Cellular component | cytoplasm; integral component of membrane; alpha9-beta1 integrin-vascular cell adhesion molecule-1 complex; membrane; tertiary granule; integral component of plasma membrane; cell surface; specific granule; dense core granule membrane; podosome; phagolysosome; alpha9-beta1 integrin-ADAM8 complex; plasma membrane; specific granule membrane; tertiary granule membrane; ficolin-1-rich granule membrane |
| Biological process | positive regulation of inflammatory response; extracellular matrix disassembly; proteolysis; positive regulation of cellular extravasation; positive regulation of neutrophil extravasation; positive regulation of protein processing; regulation of cell-cell adhesion; positive regulation of protein secretion; inflammatory response; cellular response to hypoxia; positive regulation of T cell migration; positive regulation of tumor necrosis factor (ligand) superfamily member 11 production; positive regulation of acute inflammatory response; cell morphogenesis; positive regulation of thymocyte apoptotic process; positive regulation of bone resorption; negative regulation of neuron apoptotic process; positive regulation of fibronectin-dependent thymocyte migration; positive regulation of eosinophil migration; positive regulation of NF-kappaB transcription factor activity; leukocyte migration involved in inflammatory response; positive regulation of membrane protein ectodomain proteolysis; positive regulation of protein kinase B signaling; positive regulation of T cell differentiation in thymus; lymphocyte chemotaxis; positive regulation of cell adhesion; angiogenesis; neutrophil degranulation; cell-cell adhesion; positive regulation of MAP kinase activity; positive regulation of innate immune response |
Sources:Amigo / QuickGO
Orthologs
| Databases | NCBI: entry; OMA: entry |
| Species | Human | Mouse |
| Entrez | 101 | 11501 |
| Ensembl | ENSG00000151651 | ENSMUSG00000025473 |
| UniProt | P78325 | Q05910 |
| RefSeq (mRNA) | NM_001109; NM_001164489; NM_001164490 | NM_001291066; NM_007403 |
| RefSeq (protein) | NP_001100; NP_001157961; NP_001157962 | NP_001277995; NP_031429 |
| Location (UCSC) | Chr 10: 133.26 – 133.28 Mb | Chr 7: 139.56 – 139.57 Mb |
| PubMed search |
- Wikidata
| View/Edit Human | View/Edit Mouse |

A Disintegrin and metalloproteinase domain-containing protein 8 is an enzyme that in humans is encoded by the ADAM8 gene.

== Function ==
This gene encodes a member of the ADAM (a disintegrin and metalloproteinase domain) family. Members of this family are membrane-anchored proteins structurally related to snake venom disintegrins, and have been implicated in a variety of biological processes involving cell–cell and cell-matrix interactions, including fertilization, muscle development, and neurogenesis. The protein encoded by this gene may be involved in cell adhesion during neurodegeneration.

== See also ==
- Cluster of differentiation
