= KGD =

KGD may be:

- Khrabrovo Airport – an airport in Kaliningrad, Russia with the IATA airport code "KGD"
- King's Gambit Declined – a chess opening
- KGD – an amino acid sequence that forms a Disintegrin in viper venom
