= ADAM19 =

Protein-coding gene in humans

Identifiers
- Aliases: ADAM19, MADDAM, MLTNB, FKSG34, ADAM metallopeptidase domain 19
- External IDs: OMIM: 603640; MGI: 105377; GeneCards: ADAM19

Gene location (Human)
Chr.	Chromosome 5 (human)
Band	5q33.3	Start	157,395,534 bp
Band	5q33.3	End	157,575,775 bp

Gene location (Mouse)
Chr.	Chromosome 11 (mouse)
Band	11 B1.1|11 27.54 cM	Start	45,946,819 bp
Band	11 B1.1|11 27.54 cM	End	46,038,170 bp
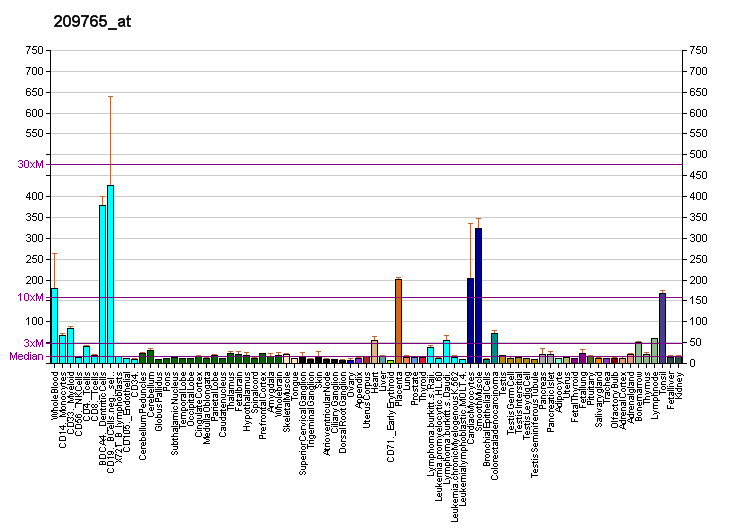
RNA expression pattern
Bgee	Human / Mouse (ortholog); Top expressed in: oocyte; stromal cell of endometrium; blood; secondary oocyte; sural nerve; appendix; saphenous vein; lymph node; granulocyte; placenta / Top expressed in: gastrula; decidua; granulocyte; atrium; tail of embryo; stroma of bone marrow; facial motor nucleus; endocardial cushion; ascending aorta; trigeminal ganglion; More reference expression data
BioGPS	More reference expression data
Gene ontology
Molecular function	SH3 domain binding; peptidase activity; metalloendopeptidase activity; metallopeptidase activity; hydrolase activity; metal ion binding; protein binding
Cellular component	integral component of membrane; Golgi apparatus; membrane; plasma membrane; nucleus; collagen-containing extracellular matrix
Biological process	development of the heart; membrane protein ectodomain proteolysis; proteolysis; extracellular matrix organization; placenta development; positive regulation of gene expression; positive regulation of cell-cell adhesion mediated by cadherin
Sources:Amigo / QuickGO
Orthologs
Databases	NCBI: entry; OMA: entry
Species	Human	Mouse
Entrez	8728	11492
Ensembl	ENSG00000135074	ENSMUSG00000011256
UniProt	Q9H013	O35674
RefSeq (mRNA)	NM_023038; NM_033274	NM_001291890; NM_001291891; NM_009616; NM_001311209
RefSeq (protein)	NP_150377	NP_001278819; NP_001278820; NP_001298138; NP_033746
Location (UCSC)	Chr 5: 157.4 – 157.58 Mb	Chr 11: 45.95 – 46.04 Mb
PubMed search
- Wikidata
View/Edit Human	View/Edit Mouse

ADAM19 (A Disintegrin And Metalloproteinase 19, MADDAM, meltrin beta), is a human gene.

== Function ==
This gene encodes a member of the ADAM (a disintegrin and metalloprotease domain) family. Members of this family are membrane-anchored proteins structurally related to snake venom disintegrins, and have been implicated in a variety of biological processes involving cell-cell and cell-matrix interactions, including fertilization, muscle development, and neurogenesis. This member is a type I transmembrane protein and serves as a marker for dendritic cell differentiation. It has also been demonstrated to be an active metalloproteinase, which may be involved in normal physiological and pathological processes such as cells migration, cell adhesion, cell-cell and cell-matrix interactions, and signal transduction. Alternative splicing results in two transcript variants.

== Interactions ==
ADAM19 has been shown to interact with ABI2.
