= Dutch hypothesis =

The Dutch hypothesis provides one of several biologically plausible explanations for the pathogenesis of chronic obstructive pulmonary disease (COPD), a progressive disease known to be aetiologically linked to environmental insults such as tobacco smoke.

The Dutch hypothesis was originally proposed by Dick Orie and his team in 1961 at the University of Groningen. According to Orie, "Bronchitis and Asthma may be found in one patient at the same age but as a rule there is a fluent development from bronchitis in youth to a more asthmatic picture in adults, which in turn develops into bronchitis of elderly patients." This supposition was later named the Dutch hypothesis by a colleague, Professor C. Fletcher. Specifically, clinical characteristics such as allergy and bronchial hyperresponsiveness that are commonly observed in individuals afflicted with asthma were viewed as likely determinants of the life-threatening disease, COPD (in the Netherlands, the term chronic non-specific lung disease was adopted as an umbrella term for asthma and COPD).

More recent molecular biology research suggests that the pathogenesis of asthma and COPD may share overlapping pathways involving innate biological susceptibility, coupled with environmental factors which can trigger the different diseases. Genetic association studies that have uncovered the same polymorphisms in people with asthma and COPD provide support for the notion that the two conditions share some biological characteristics; implicated genes include ADAM33, CCL5 and IL17F.

Although clinically debated, the Dutch hypothesis remains one of four main plausible explanations which could help explain the complex pathogenesis of COPD, others being the protease-antiprotease hypothesis (involving alpha 1-antitrypsin overexpression and consequent alpha-1 proteinase deficiency), the British hypothesis (regarding a putative aetiological role of acute bronchial infections), and the autoimmunity hypothesis.
