= ADAM23 =

Protein-coding gene in humans

Identifiers
- Aliases: ADAM23, MDC-3, MDC3, ADAM metallopeptidase domain 23
- External IDs: OMIM: 603710; MGI: 1345162; GeneCards: ADAM23

Gene location (Human)
Chr.	Chromosome 2 (human)
Band	2q33.3	Start	206,443,532 bp
Band	2q33.3	End	206,621,127 bp

Gene location (Mouse)
Chr.	Chromosome 1 (mouse)
Band	1 C2|1 32.31 cM	Start	63,485,050 bp
Band	1 C2|1 32.31 cM	End	63,635,435 bp
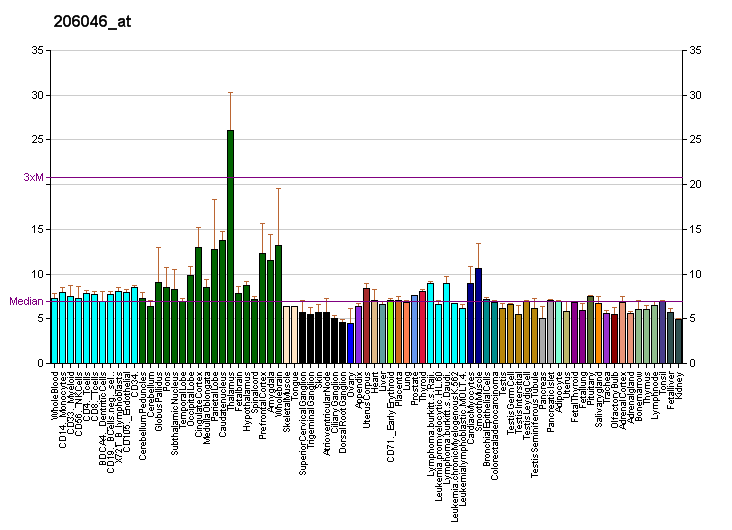
RNA expression pattern
Bgee	Human / Mouse (ortholog); Top expressed in: Brodmann area 10; middle temporal gyrus; Brodmann area 23; lateral nuclear group of thalamus; primary visual cortex; postcentral gyrus; superior frontal gyrus; Brodmann area 9; left ventricle; nucleus accumbens / Top expressed in: facial motor nucleus; superior frontal gyrus; substantia nigra; cerebellar cortex; anterior horn of spinal cord; pontine nuclei; supraoptic nucleus; primary visual cortex; medial vestibular nucleus; deep cerebellar nuclei; More reference expression data
BioGPS	More reference expression data
Gene ontology
Molecular function	integrin binding; metalloendopeptidase activity; protein binding; metallopeptidase activity
Cellular component	integral component of membrane; extracellular region; plasma membrane; integral component of plasma membrane; membrane; glutamatergic synapse; integral component of presynaptic membrane
Biological process	central nervous system development; cell adhesion; proteolysis; cellular response to leukemia inhibitory factor
Sources:Amigo / QuickGO
Orthologs
Databases	NCBI: entry; OMA: entry
Species	Human	Mouse
Entrez	8745	23792
Ensembl	ENSG00000114948	ENSMUSG00000025964
UniProt	O75077	Q9R1V7
RefSeq (mRNA)	NM_003812	NM_001177600; NM_011780
RefSeq (protein)	NP_003803	NP_035910
Location (UCSC)	Chr 2: 206.44 – 206.62 Mb	Chr 1: 63.49 – 63.64 Mb
PubMed search
- Wikidata
View/Edit Human	View/Edit Mouse

Disintegrin and metalloproteinase domain-containing protein 23 is a non-catalytic protein that in humans is encoded by the ADAM23 gene. It is a member of the ADAM family of extracellular matrix metalloproteinases.

== Function ==
This gene encodes a member of the ADAM (a disintegrin and metalloprotease domain) family. Members of this family are membrane-anchored proteins structurally related to snake venom disintegrins, and have been implicated in a variety of biological processes involving cell-cell and cell-matrix interactions, including fertilization, muscle development, and neurogenesis. This gene is highly expressed in the brain and may function as an integrin ligand in the brain.
