= ABI2 =

Protein-coding gene in humans

Identifiers
- Aliases: ABI2, ABI-2, ABI2B, AIP-1, AblBP3, SSH3BP2, argBP1, argBPIA, argBPIB, abl-interactor 2, abl interactor 2, AIP1
- External IDs: OMIM: 606442; MGI: 106913; GeneCards: ABI2
Available structures
PDB	Ortholog search: PDBe RCSB
PDB	List of PDB id codes 2ED0, 3P8C, 4N78

Gene location (Human)
Chr.	Chromosome 2 (human)
Band	2q33.2	Start	203,328,239 bp
Band	2q33.2	End	203,447,728 bp

Gene location (Mouse)
Chr.	Chromosome 1 (mouse)
Band	1|1 C2	Start	60,448,778 bp
Band	1|1 C2	End	60,520,317 bp
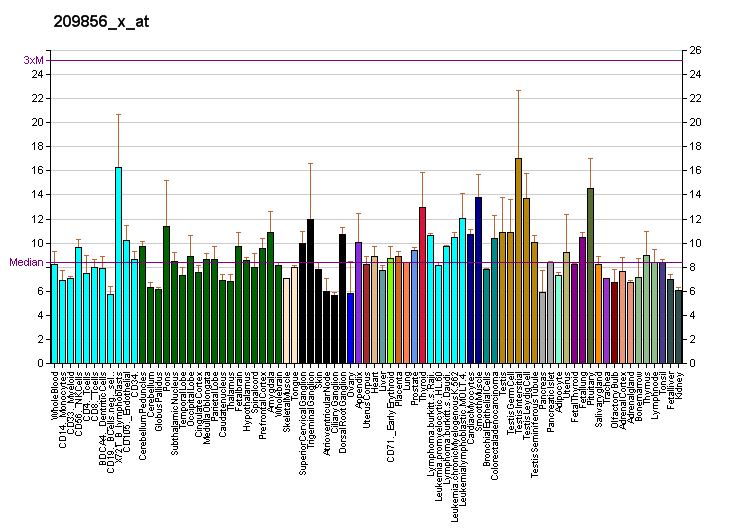

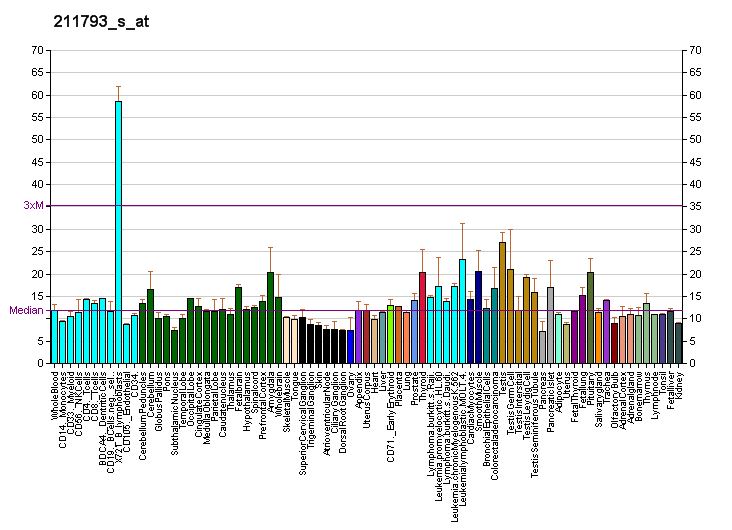

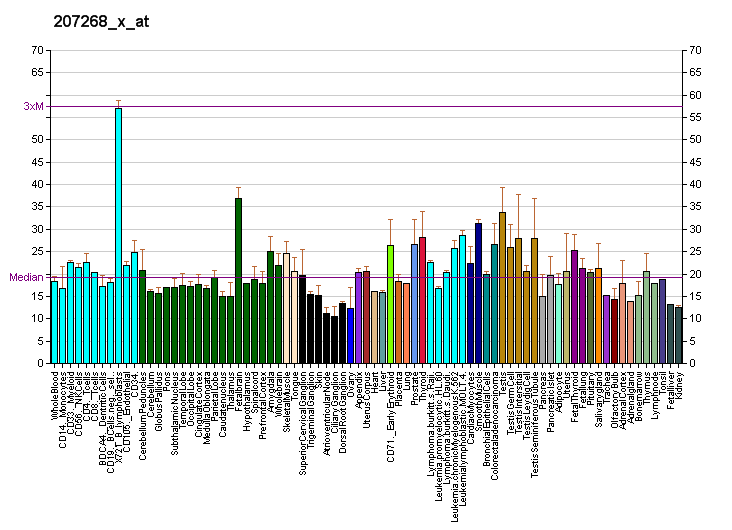
RNA expression pattern
Bgee	Human / Mouse (ortholog); Top expressed in: Brodmann area 23; entorhinal cortex; middle temporal gyrus; postcentral gyrus; external globus pallidus; internal globus pallidus; superior frontal gyrus; superior vestibular nucleus; ventral tegmental area; lateral nuclear group of thalamus / Top expressed in: lateral septal nucleus; olfactory tubercle; anterior amygdaloid area; primary motor cortex; ventromedial nucleus; piriform cortex; Region I of hippocampus proper; cingulate gyrus; subiculum; nucleus accumbens; More reference expression data
BioGPS	More reference expression data
Gene ontology
Molecular function	DNA binding; SH3 domain binding; kinase binding; protein binding; cytoskeletal anchor activity; proline-rich region binding; ubiquitin protein ligase binding; protein-containing complex binding; protein tyrosine kinase activator activity
Cellular component	cytoplasm; cytosol; cell projection; SCAR complex; cytoskeleton; lamellipodium; filopodium; filopodium tip; dendrite; nucleus; adherens junction; cell junction; dendritic spine
Biological process	positive regulation of Arp2/3 complex-mediated actin nucleation; cytoskeleton organization; peptidyl-tyrosine phosphorylation; Rac protein signal transduction; viral process; cell migration; actin polymerization or depolymerization; learning or memory; dendrite development; camera-type eye development; nervous system development; regulation of dendritic spine morphogenesis; lens fiber cell morphogenesis
Sources:Amigo / QuickGO
Orthologs
Databases	NCBI: entry; OMA: entry
Species	Human	Mouse
Entrez	10152	329165
Ensembl	ENSG00000138443	ENSMUSG00000026782
UniProt	Q9NYB9	P62484
RefSeq (mRNA)	NM_001282925; NM_001282926; NM_001282927; NM_001282932; NM_005759	NM_001198570; NM_001198571; NM_198127
RefSeq (protein)	NP_001269854; NP_001269855; NP_001269856; NP_001269861; NP_005750 NP_001362591; NP_001362592; NP_001362593; NP_001362594; NP_001362595; NP_001362596; NP_001362597; NP_001362598; NP_001362599; NP_001362600; NP_001362601; NP_001362602; NP_001362603; NP_001362604; NP_001362605; NP_001362606; NP_001362607; NP_001362608; NP_001362609; NP_001362610; NP_001362611; NP_001362612; NP_001362613; NP_001362614; NP_001362615; NP_001362616; NP_001362617; NP_001362618; NP_001362619; NP_001362620; NP_001362621; NP_001362622; NP_001362624; NP_001362625; NP_001362627; NP_001362628; NP_001362631; NP_001362633; NP_001362635; NP_001362636; NP_001362637; NP_001362638; NP_001362639; NP_001362640; NP_001362641; NP_001362643; NP_001362646; NP_001362648; NP_001362650; NP_001362651; NP_001362652; NP_001362653; NP_001362654; NP_001362655; NP_001362656; NP_001362657; NP_001362658; NP_001362659; NP_001362660; NP_001362661; NP_001362662; NP_001362663; NP_001362664; NP_001362665; NP_001362666; NP_001362667; NP_001362668; NP_001362669; NP_001362670; NP_001362671; NP_001362672; NP_001362673; NP_001362674; NP_001362675; NP_001362676; NP_001362677; NP_001362678; NP_001362679; NP_001362680; NP_001362681; NP_001362682; NP_001362683; NP_001362684	NP_001185499; NP_001185500; NP_937760; NP_001391634; NP_001391635 NP_001391636; NP_001391637; NP_001391638; NP_001391639; NP_001391640; NP_001391641; NP_001391642; NP_001391643; NP_001391644; NP_001391645; NP_001391646; NP_001391647; NP_001391648; NP_001391649; NP_001391650
Location (UCSC)	Chr 2: 203.33 – 203.45 Mb	Chr 1: 60.45 – 60.52 Mb
PubMed search
- Wikidata
View/Edit Human	View/Edit Mouse

Abl interactor 2 also known as Abelson interactor 2 (Abi-2) is a protein that in humans is encoded by the ABI2 gene.

== Interactions ==
ABI2 has been shown to interact with ABL1, ADAM19, and TRIM32.
