= ADAM3 =

Protein found in humans

A disintegrin and metalloprotease 3, or ADAM3, belongs to a family of peptidase proteins referred to as ADAMs. Many of these are solely found in spermatogenic cells, specifically in the anterior portion of capacitated spermatozoa heads. This membrane protein is critical for crucial steps in fertilization such as migration of sperm through the uterus to the oviduct as well as binding to the zona pellucida. Inactivation of ADAM3 is a cause of male infertility.

Numerous studies have detailed that in ADAM3 null mice, the spermatozoa fail to migrate through the utero-tubal junction. Furthermore, knockout of the closely related ADAM1a gene in mice, an estrogen receptor not found in mature spermatozoa, causes loss of surface ADAM3 and decreased zona pellucida binding. Other studies have shown ADAM3-/- mouse spermatozoa fail to show sperm-sperm aggregation, although the significance of this is still unknown. ADAM3 has not yet been found in humans.
