= Sheddase =

Enzyme family

Diagram of an ectodomain shedding ADAM metalloprotease.

Sheddases are membrane-bound enzymes that cleave extracellular portions of transmembrane proteins, releasing the soluble ectodomains from the cell surface. Many sheddases are members of the ADAM or aspartic protease (BACE) protein families.

These enzymes can activate a transmembrane protein if it is a receptor (e.g., HER2), or cut off the part of the transmembrane protein which has already bound an agonist (e.g., in the case of EGFR), allowing this agonist to go and stimulate a receptor on another cell. Hence, sheddases demultiply the yield of agonists. Sheddase inhibitors active on ADAM10 and ADAM17 can potentiate anti-cancer therapy.

== Functions ==
It has been postulated that the activity of sheddases occurs in relation to the amount of general enzymatic activity. Research indicates that sheddases are instead related to phosphatidylserine exposure. When PSA-3 cells' ability to synthesize phosphatidylserine was repressed, sheddase activity decreased, and the sheddase activity returned to normal levels when the cells were again able to synthesize phosphatidylserine. This led researchers to conclude that phosphatidyserine exposure is necessary for cells to exhibit sheddase activity.

== Uses ==
Due to the nature of the mechanisms and functions of sheddase enzymes, they have been studied on the basis of discovering possible uses in medicine. One such use is in the treatment of allergic responses and other processes of the immune system. ADAM10 is responsible for the shedding of the CD23 Immunoglobulin receptor, which releases soluble sCD23. sCD23 present in the blood serum contributes to immune response and, to some, the onset of inflammatory disease such as asthma. Given that ADAM10 sheddase cleaves CD23 and increases the levels of sCD23, possible treatments for these diseases may center around the inhibition of sheddase function.

Tumor necrosis factor alpha converting enzyme (TACE) is a sheddase protein that has been observed in many types of cancer and could serve as an important Biomarker (medicine) used in the detection of cancer. While the expression of TACE does not directly correlate with particular stages of cancer, the shedding activity of the enzyme is significantly more prominent in head and neck cancer cells compared to normal cultured cells.

== See also ==
- Ectodomain shedding
