= TRIM32 =

Protein-coding gene in the species Homo sapiens

Identifiers
- Aliases: TRIM32, BBS11, HT2A, LGMD2H, TATIP, tripartite motif containing 32, LGMDR8
- External IDs: OMIM: 602290; MGI: 1917057; GeneCards: TRIM32
Available structures
PDB	Ortholog search: PDBe RCSB
PDB	List of PDB id codes 2CT2, 5FEY
Enzyme activity
EC #	BRENDA	ExPASy	KEGG	MetaCyc
2.3.2.27	↗	↗	↗	↗

Gene location (Human)
Chr.	Chromosome 9 (human)
Band	9q33.1	Start	116,687,305 bp
Band	9q33.1	End	116,701,300 bp

Gene location (Mouse)
Chr.	Chromosome 4 (mouse)
Band	4 C1|4 34.43 cM	Start	65,523,223 bp
Band	4 C1|4 34.43 cM	End	65,534,475 bp
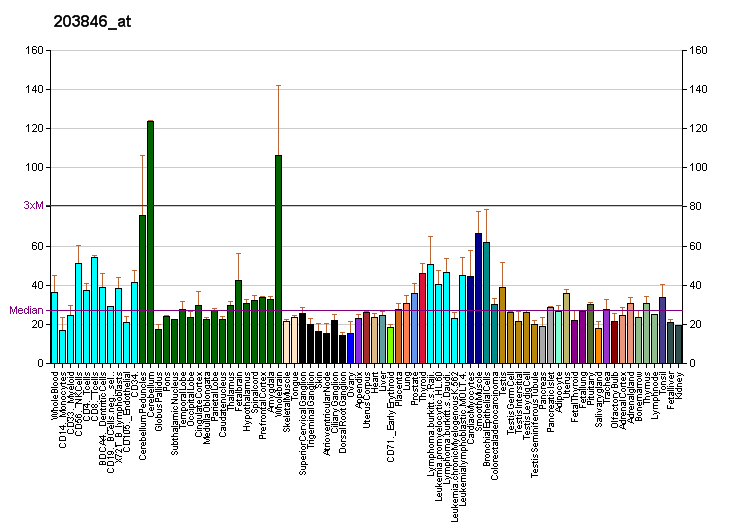
RNA expression pattern
Bgee	Human / Mouse (ortholog); Top expressed in: stromal cell of endometrium; tibialis anterior muscle; gastrocnemius muscle; secondary oocyte; testicle; muscle of thigh; deltoid muscle; gonad; Skeletal muscle tissue of biceps brachii; bronchial epithelial cell / Top expressed in: dorsomedial hypothalamic nucleus; piriform cortex; habenula; ventral tegmental area; superior colliculus; subiculum; visual cortex; dorsal tegmental nucleus; medial geniculate nucleus; lobe of cerebellum; More reference expression data
BioGPS	More reference expression data
Gene ontology
Molecular function	ubiquitin protein ligase activity; myosin binding; transcription coactivator activity; zinc ion binding; Tat protein binding; metal ion binding; ubiquitin-protein transferase activity; protein self-association; ubiquitin binding; protein binding; RNA binding; translation initiation factor binding; transferase activity; identical protein binding
Cellular component	cytoplasm; cytosol; intracellular anatomical structure; striated muscle myosin thick filament; nucleus
Biological process	positive regulation of interleukin-17-mediated signaling pathway; axon development; positive regulation of cell motility; positive regulation of protein catabolic process; muscle cell cellular homeostasis; positive regulation of tumor necrosis factor-mediated signaling pathway; positive regulation of cell migration; positive regulation of DNA-binding transcription factor activity; protein polyubiquitination; negative regulation of intrinsic apoptotic signaling pathway in response to DNA damage; actin ubiquitination; regulation of type I interferon production; response to tumor necrosis factor; positive regulation of neurogenesis; positive regulation of cell growth; positive regulation of cell cycle; positive regulation of NF-kappaB transcription factor activity; protein ubiquitination; positive regulation of neuron differentiation; tissue homeostasis; positive regulation of striated muscle cell differentiation; positive regulation of proteolysis; positive regulation of I-kappaB kinase/NF-kappaB signaling; innate immune response; negative regulation of fibroblast proliferation; positive regulation of chemokine (C-C motif) ligand 20 production; fat cell differentiation; response to UV; negative regulation of viral transcription; ubiquitin-dependent protein catabolic process; positive regulation of nucleic acid-templated transcription; protein K48-linked ubiquitination
Sources:Amigo / QuickGO
Orthologs
Databases	NCBI: entry; OMA: entry
Species	Human	Mouse
Entrez	22954	69807
Ensembl	ENSG00000119401	ENSMUSG00000051675
UniProt	Q13049	Q8CH72
RefSeq (mRNA)	NM_001099679; NM_012210; NM_001379048; NM_001379049; NM_001379050	NM_001161782; NM_053084
RefSeq (protein)	NP_001093149; NP_036342; NP_001365977; NP_001365978; NP_001365979	NP_001155254; NP_444314
Location (UCSC)	Chr 9: 116.69 – 116.7 Mb	Chr 4: 65.52 – 65.53 Mb
PubMed search
- Wikidata
View/Edit Human	View/Edit Mouse

Tripartite motif-containing protein 32 is a protein that in humans is encoded by the TRIM32 gene. Since its discovery in 1995, TRIM32 has been shown to be implicated in a number of diverse biological pathways.

== Structure ==
The protein encoded by this gene is a member of the tripartite motif (TRIM) family. The TRIM motif includes three zinc-binding domains, a RING, a B-box type 1 and a B-box type 2, and a coiled-coil region.

== Subcellular distribution ==
The protein localizes to cytoplasmic bodies. The protein has also been localized to the nucleus, where it interacts with the activation domain of the HIV-1 Tat protein. The Tat protein activates transcription of HIV-1 genes.

== Interactions ==
TRIM32 has been shown to interact with:

- actin,
- ABI2
- c-Myc,
- dysbindin, and
- piasy,

== Function ==
=== Mechanism ===
Currently, TRIM32 is believed to employ two different mechanisms to affect molecular targets. First, it can act through its N-terminal RING finger as an E3 ubiquitin ligase, responsible for attaching ubiquitin molecules to lysine residues of target proteins, in order to mark them for proteosome degradation. Currently evidence suggests TRIM32 ubiquitinates multiple proteins including c-Myc, dysbindin, actin, piasy, and Abl-interactor2 (ABI2). The second mechanism by which TRIM32 is believed to operate involves binding of proteins to the C-terminal NHL repeat, which has been shown to activate miRNAs.

=== Development ===
Research has recently shown the importance of TRIM32 in the development of the mouse neocortex. In the mouse neocortex, neural progenitor cells generate daughter cells which either differentiate into specific neurons or maintain the progenitor state of the mother cell. TRIM32 helps control the balance between differentiating and progenitor cells by localizing to a pole during progenitor cell division, and thus becoming concentrated in one of the two daughter cells. This asymmetric division of TRIM32 induces neuronal differentiation in daughter cells which contain high TRIM32 concentrations, while cells with low TRIM32 concentrations retain progenitor cell fate. Proposed theories on how TRIM32 induces differentiation involve the ubiquitination of the transcription factor c-Myc and the binding of Argonaute-1 (Ago-1). The binding of Ago-1 induces activity of miRNAs, particularly Let-7a, which has been shown to play a role in regulating proliferation and neuronal differentiation.

=== Skeletal muscle ===
TRIM32 is expressed in skeletal muscle, where it interacts with myosin and may ubiquitinate actin (it has been shown to do so in vitro). No difference has been observed between wild-type and LHMD2H-mutated TRIM32 in terms of actin or myosin binding, however, and thus the mechanism which causes the muscular dystrophy, LGMD2H, is still unknown. Additionally, TRIM32 is known to ubiquitinate dysbindin, a protein associated with both skeletal muscles and neural tissue. The purpose and effects of the ubiquitination of dysbindin are as yet unclear.

== Clinical significance ==
=== Mutation-associated diseases ===
Bardet–Biedl syndrome (BBS): TRIM32 is one of 14 genes known to be linked with BBS. Specifically a mutation (P130S) in the B-box of TRIM32 gives rise to BBS.

Limb-girdle muscular dystrophy type2H (LGMD2H): LGMD2H is caused by 4 mutations of TRIM32 in the C-terminal NHL domain: D487N (third NHL repeat), R394H (first NHL repeat), T520TfsX13 (fourth NHL repeat), and D588del (fifth NHL repeat).

=== Cancer ===
TRIM32 is overexpressed in skin cancer cells. It is thought that TRIM32 regulates NF-κB activity through ubiquitination of Protein Inhibitor of Activated STAT Y (Piasy). Piasy acts as an inhibitor of NF-κB, and NF-κB acts as an anti-apoptotic factor. Thus, when Piasy is present, NF-κB is inhibited, and keratinocytes undergo apoptosis when exposed to ultraviolet-B radiation or TNFα, preventing cancer formation. When TRIM32 is overexpressed, Piasy is degraded, allowing NF-κB to function, and thus when cells are exposed to ultraviolet-B radiation or TNFα, apoptosis does not occur, potentially allowing cancer formation.

TRIM32 additionally promotes cancer formation by ubiquitinating Abl-interactor 2 (Abi2), which is a tumor suppressor and inhibitor of cell migration.

== See also ==
- tripartite motif family
