= ADAM28 =

Protein-coding gene in humans

Identifiers
- Aliases: ADAM28, ADAM 28, ADAM23, MDC-L, MDC-Lm, MDC-Ls, MDCL, eMDC II, eMDCII, ADAM metallopeptidase domain 28
- External IDs: OMIM: 606188; MGI: 105988; GeneCards: ADAM28

Gene location (Human)
Chr.	Chromosome 8 (human)
Band	8p21.2	Start	24,294,069 bp
Band	8p21.2	End	24,359,014 bp

Gene location (Mouse)
Chr.	Chromosome 14 (mouse)
Band	14|14 D1	Start	68,843,476 bp
Band	14|14 D1	End	68,893,291 bp
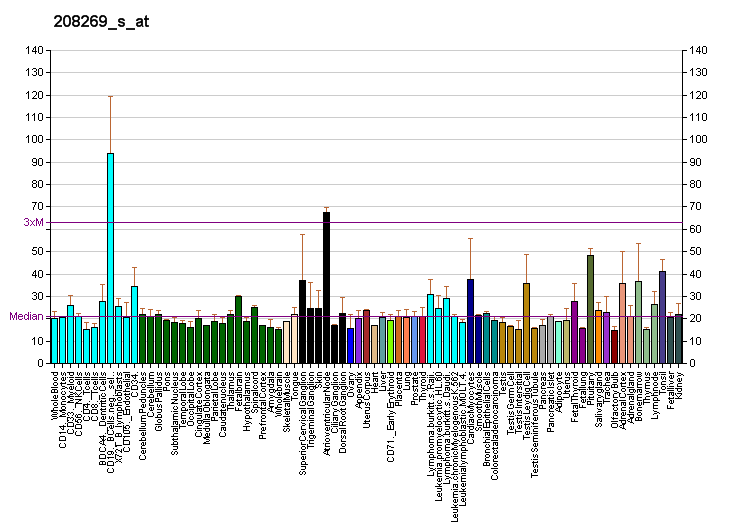

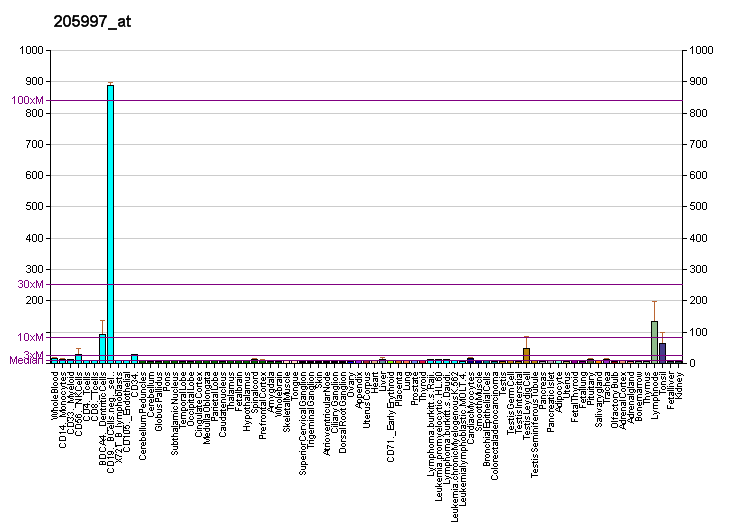
RNA expression pattern
Bgee	Human / Mouse (ortholog); Top expressed in: corpus epididymis; nasal epithelium; olfactory zone of nasal mucosa; gallbladder; pancreatic ductal cell; right uterine tube; epithelium of nasopharynx; mucosa of paranasal sinus; bronchial epithelial cell; appendix / Top expressed in: superior surface of tongue; gallbladder; Ileal epithelium; nasal epithelium; olfactory epithelium; transitional epithelium of urinary bladder; corneal stroma; plantaris muscle; extensor digitorum longus muscle; interventricular septum; More reference expression data
BioGPS	More reference expression data
Gene ontology
Molecular function	peptidase activity; metalloendopeptidase activity; hydrolase activity; metallopeptidase activity; metal ion binding
Cellular component	integral component of membrane; extracellular region; membrane; mitochondrion; plasma membrane
Biological process	spermatogenesis; proteolysis
Sources:Amigo / QuickGO
Orthologs
Databases	NCBI: entry; OMA: entry
Species	Human	Mouse
Entrez	10863	13522
Ensembl	ENSG00000042980	ENSMUSG00000014725
UniProt	Q9UKQ2	Q9JLN6
RefSeq (mRNA)	NM_001304351; NM_014265; NM_021777	NM_001048175; NM_010082; NM_176991; NM_183366
RefSeq (protein)	NP_001291280; NP_055080; NP_068547	NP_001041640; NP_034212; NP_899222
Location (UCSC)	Chr 8: 24.29 – 24.36 Mb	Chr 14: 68.84 – 68.89 Mb
PubMed search
- Wikidata
View/Edit Human	View/Edit Mouse

Disintegrin and metalloproteinase domain-containing protein 28 is an enzyme that in humans is encoded by the ADAM28 gene.

This gene encodes a member of the ADAM (a disintegrin and metalloprotease domain) family. Members of this family are membrane-anchored proteins structurally related to snake venom disintegrins, and have been implicated in a variety of biological processes involving cell–cell and cell–matrix interactions, including fertilization, muscle development, and neurogenesis. The protein encoded by this gene is a lymphocyte-expressed ADAM protein. Alternative splicing results in two transcript variants. The shorter version encodes a secreted isoform, while the longer version encodes a transmembrane isoform.
