= ADAM11 =

Protein-coding gene in humans

Identifiers
- Aliases: ADAM11, MDC, ADAM metallopeptidase domain 11
- External IDs: OMIM: 155120; MGI: 1098667; GeneCards: ADAM11

Gene location (Human)
Chr.	Chromosome 17 (human)
Band	17q21.31	Start	44,758,988 bp
Band	17q21.31	End	44,781,846 bp

Gene location (Mouse)
Chr.	Chromosome 11 (mouse)
Band	11 E1|11 66.48 cM	Start	102,652,265 bp
Band	11 E1|11 66.48 cM	End	102,671,088 bp
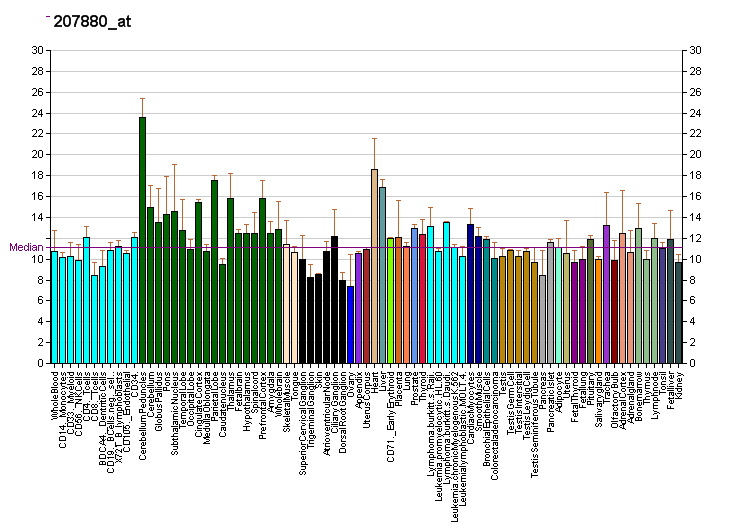
RNA expression pattern
Bgee	Human / Mouse (ortholog); Top expressed in: right hemisphere of cerebellum; right frontal lobe; prefrontal cortex; cingulate gyrus; anterior cingulate cortex; Brodmann area 9; apex of heart; superior frontal gyrus; postcentral gyrus; primary visual cortex / Top expressed in: cerebellar cortex; primary visual cortex; dentate gyrus of hippocampal formation granule cell; superior frontal gyrus; lobe of cerebellum; liver parenchyma; cerebellar vermis; hippocampus proper; habenula; trigeminal ganglion; More reference expression data
BioGPS	More reference expression data
Gene ontology
Molecular function	integrin binding; metalloendopeptidase activity; metallopeptidase activity
Cellular component	extracellular matrix; integral component of membrane; plasma membrane; membrane; collagen-containing extracellular matrix
Biological process	integrin-mediated signaling pathway; proteolysis
Sources:Amigo / QuickGO
Orthologs
Databases	NCBI: entry; OMA: entry
Species	Human	Mouse
Entrez	4185	11488
Ensembl	ENSG00000073670	ENSMUSG00000020926
UniProt	O75078	Q9R1V4
RefSeq (mRNA)	NM_002390; NM_001318933	NM_001110778; NM_009613
RefSeq (protein)	NP_001305862; NP_002381	NP_001104248; NP_033743
Location (UCSC)	Chr 17: 44.76 – 44.78 Mb	Chr 11: 102.65 – 102.67 Mb
PubMed search
- Wikidata
View/Edit Human	View/Edit Mouse

Disintegrin and metalloproteinase domain-containing protein 11 is an enzyme that in humans is encoded by the ADAM11 gene.

This gene encodes a member of the ADAM (a disintegrin and metalloprotease) protein family. Members of this family are membrane-anchored proteins structurally related to snake venom disintegrins, and have been implicated in a variety of biological processes involving cell-cell and cell-matrix interactions, including fertilization, muscle development, and neurogenesis. This gene represents a candidate tumor suppressor gene for human breast cancer based on its location within a minimal region of chromosome 17q21 previously defined by tumor deletion mapping.
