= ADAM17 =

Protein found in humans

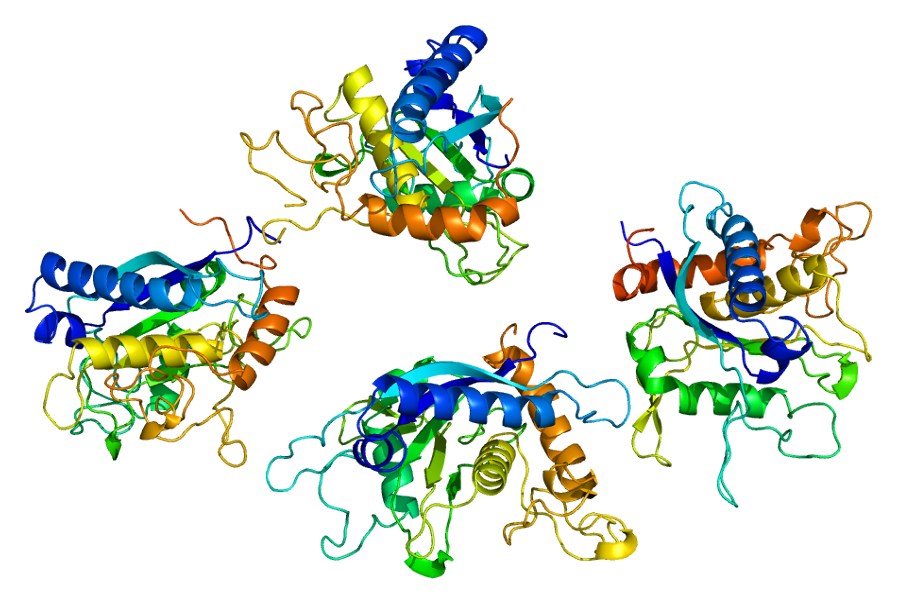

Identifiers
- Aliases: ADAM17, ADAM18, CD156B, CSVP, NISBD, NISBD1, TACE, ADAM metallopeptidase domain 17
- External IDs: OMIM: 603639; MGI: 1096335; GeneCards: ADAM17
Available structures
PDB	Ortholog search: PDBe RCSB
PDB	List of PDB id codes 1BKC, 1ZXC, 2A8H, 2DDF, 2FV5, 2FV9, 2I47, 2M2F, 2OI0, 3B92, 3CKI, 3E8R, 3EDZ, 3EWJ, 3G42, 3KMC, 3KME, 3L0T, 3L0V, 3LE9, 3LEA, 3LGP, 3O64
Enzyme activity
EC #	BRENDA	ExPASy	KEGG	MetaCyc
3.4.24.86	↗	↗	↗	↗

Gene location (Human)
Chr.	Chromosome 2 (human)
Band	2p25.1	Start	9,488,486 bp
Band	2p25.1	End	9,556,732 bp

Gene location (Mouse)
Chr.	Chromosome 12 (mouse)
Band	12 A1.3|12 8.3 cM	Start	21,373,510 bp
Band	12 A1.3|12 8.3 cM	End	21,423,633 bp
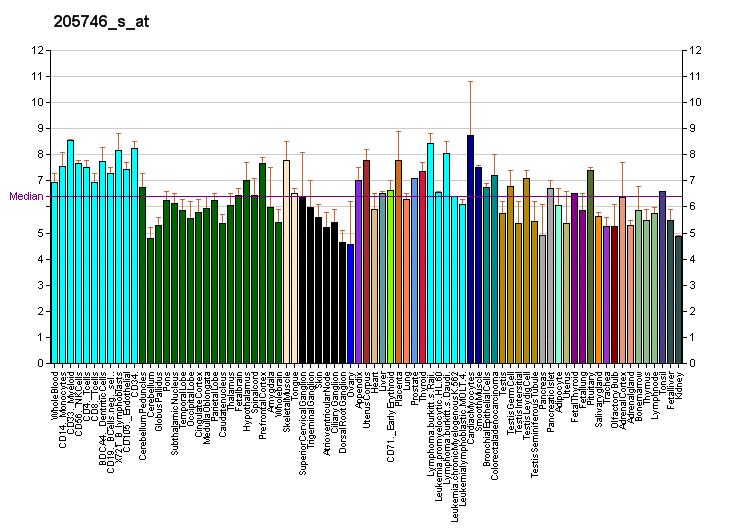

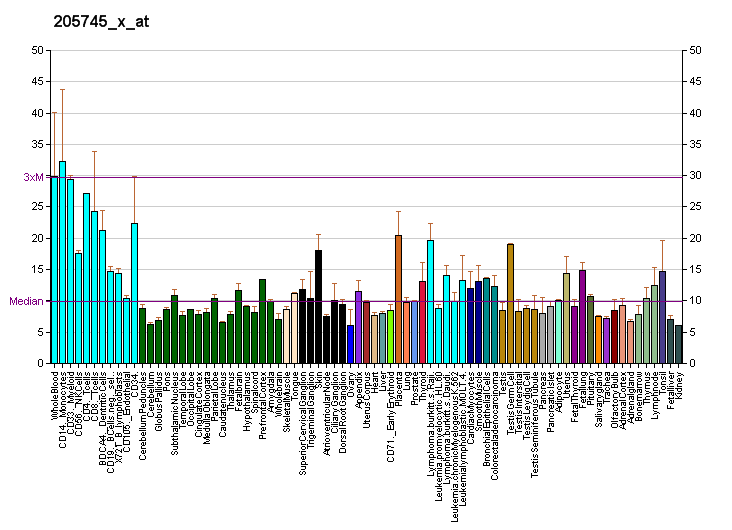

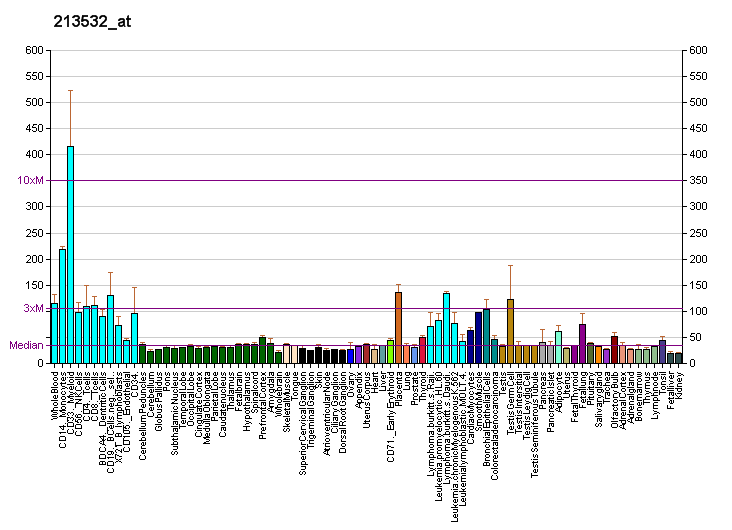
RNA expression pattern
Bgee	Human / Mouse (ortholog); Top expressed in: oocyte; Achilles tendon; pericardium; monocyte; tendon of biceps brachii; sural nerve; lower lobe of lung; right lung; gallbladder; upper lobe of lung / Top expressed in: otic vesicle; saccule; otic placode; primary oocyte; secondary oocyte; cumulus cell; genital tubercle; tail of embryo; stroma of bone marrow; left lung lobe; More reference expression data
BioGPS	More reference expression data
Gene ontology
Molecular function	PDZ domain binding; interleukin-6 receptor binding; SH3 domain binding; metal ion binding; Notch binding; integrin binding; peptidase activity; protein binding; metalloendopeptidase activity; hydrolase activity; metallopeptidase activity; endopeptidase activity
Cellular component	cytoplasm; integral component of membrane; membrane; cell-cell junction; focal adhesion; plasma membrane; integral component of plasma membrane; ruffle membrane; cell surface; apical plasma membrane; actin cytoskeleton; membrane raft; cytosol
Biological process	Notch signaling pathway; positive regulation of transforming growth factor beta receptor signaling pathway; positive regulation of epidermal growth factor-activated receptor activity; positive regulation of protein phosphorylation; response to hypoxia; T cell differentiation in thymus; cell motility; positive regulation of cell migration; wound healing, spreading of epidermal cells; germinal center formation; tumor necrosis factor-mediated signaling pathway; negative regulation of transforming growth factor beta receptor signaling pathway; spleen development; proteolysis; positive regulation of leukocyte chemotaxis; positive regulation of cell growth; response to lipopolysaccharide; cell adhesion; cell adhesion mediated by integrin; membrane protein ectodomain proteolysis; membrane protein intracellular domain proteolysis; regulation of mast cell apoptotic process; positive regulation of T cell chemotaxis; positive regulation of cell population proliferation; Notch receptor processing; positive regulation of chemokine production; neutrophil mediated immunity; B cell differentiation; defense response to Gram-positive bacterium; epidermal growth factor receptor signaling pathway; receptor transactivation; positive regulation of blood vessel endothelial cell migration; positive regulation of cyclin-dependent protein serine/threonine kinase activity; cellular response to high density lipoprotein particle stimulus; negative regulation of cold-induced thermogenesis; positive regulation of G1/S transition of mitotic cell cycle; positive regulation of tumor necrosis factor-mediated signaling pathway; positive regulation of vascular endothelial cell proliferation
Sources:Amigo / QuickGO
Orthologs
Databases	NCBI: entry; OMA: entry
Species	Human	Mouse
Entrez	6868	11491
Ensembl	ENSG00000151694	ENSMUSG00000052593
UniProt	P78536	Q9Z0F8
RefSeq (mRNA)	NM_003183; NM_001382777; NM_001382778; NM_021832	NM_001277266; NM_009615; NM_001291871
RefSeq (protein)	NP_003174	NP_001264195; NP_001278800; NP_033745
Location (UCSC)	Chr 2: 9.49 – 9.56 Mb	Chr 12: 21.37 – 21.42 Mb
PubMed search
- Wikidata
View/Edit Human	View/Edit Mouse

A disintegrin and metalloprotease 17 (ADAM17), also called TACE (tumor necrosis factor-α-converting enzyme), is a 70-kDa enzyme that belongs to the ADAM protein family of disintegrins and metalloproteases, activated by substrate presentation.

== Structure ==
ADAM17 is an 824-amino acid polypeptide.

ADAM17 has multidomain structure that includes a pro-domain, a metallo-protease domain, a disintegrin domain, a cysteine-rich domain, an EGF-like domain, a transmembrane domain, and a cytoplasmic tail. The metalloprotease domain is responsible for the enzyme's catalytic activity, cleaving membrane-bound proteins, including cytokines like TNF-alpha, to release their soluble forms. The disintegrin and cysteine-rich domains are implicated in cell adhesion and interaction with integrins, while the transmembrane domain anchors the protein in the membrane. The cytoplasmic tail is involved in intracellular signaling and protein-protein interactions. ADAM17's activity is tightly regulated through multiple mechanisms, including the removal of its pro-domain and interactions with regulatory proteins such as TIMPs (tissue inhibitors of metalloproteinases).

== Function ==
ADAM17 is understood to be involved in the processing of tumor necrosis factor alpha (TNF-α) at the surface of the cell, and from within the intracellular membranes of the trans-Golgi network. This process, which is also known as 'shedding', involves the cleavage and release of a soluble ectodomain from membrane-bound pro-proteins (such as pro-TNF-α), and is of known physiological importance. ADAM17 was the first 'sheddase' to be identified, and is also understood to play a role in the release of a diverse variety of membrane-anchored cytokines, cell adhesion molecules, receptors, ligands, and enzymes.

Cloning of the TNF-α gene revealed it to encode a 26 kDa type II transmembrane pro-polypeptide that becomes inserted into the cell membrane during its maturation. At the cell surface, pro-TNF-α is biologically active, and is able to induce immune responses via juxtacrine intercellular signaling. However, pro-TNF-α can undergo a proteolytic cleavage at its Ala76-Val77 amide bond, which releases a soluble 17kDa extracellular domain (ectodomain) from the pro-TNF-α molecule. This soluble ectodomain is the cytokine commonly known as TNF-α, which is of pivotal importance in paracrine signaling. This proteolytic liberation of soluble TNF-α is catalyzed by ADAM17.

ADAM17 may play a prominent role in the Notch signaling pathway, during the proteolytic release of the Notch intracellular domain (from the Notch1 receptor) that occurs following ligand binding. ADAM17 also regulates the MAP kinase signaling pathway by regulating shedding of the EGFR ligand amphiregulin in the mammary gland. ADAM17 also has a role in the shedding of L-selectin, a cellular adhesion molecule.

== Activation ==
The localization of ADAM17 is speculated to be an important determinant of shedding activity. TNF-α processing has classically been understood to occur in the trans-Golgi network, and be closely connected to transport of soluble TNF-α to the cell surface. Shedding is also associated with clustering of ADAM17 with its substrate, membrane bound TNF, in lipid rafts. The overall process is called substrate presentation and regulated by cholesterol. Research also suggests that the majority of mature, endogenous ADAM17 may be localized to a perinuclear compartment, with only a small amount of TACE being present on the cell surface. The localization of mature ADAM17 to a perinuclear compartment, therefore, raises the possibility that ADAM17-mediated ectodomain shedding may also occur in the intracellular environment, in contrast with the conventional model.

Functional ADAM17 has been documented to be ubiquitously expressed in the human colon, with increased activity in the colonic mucosa of patients with ulcerative colitis, a main form of inflammatory bowel disease. Other experiments have also suggested that expression of ADAM17 may be inhibited by ethanol.

== Interactions ==
ADAM17 has been shown to interact with:

- DLG1
- MAD2L1, and
- MAPK1.
- iRhom2.

== Clinical significance ==
Adam17 may facilitate entry of the SARS‑CoV‑2 virus, possibly by enabling fusion of virus particles with the cytoplasmic membrane. Adam17 has similar ACE2 cleavage activity as TMPRSS2, but by forming soluble ACE2, Adam17 may actually have the protective effect of blocking circulating SARS‑CoV‑2 virus particles.

Adam17 sheddase activity may contribute to COVID-19 inflammation by cleavage of TNF-α and Interleukin-6 receptor.

Recently, ADAM17 was discovered as a crucial mediator of resistance to radiotherapy. Radiotherapy can induce a dose-dependent increase of furin-mediated cleavage of the ADAM17 proform to active ADAM17, which results in enhanced ADAM17 activity in vitro and in vivo. It was also shown that radiotherapy activates ADAM17 in non-small cell lung cancer, which results in shedding of multiple survival factors, growth factor pathway activation, and radiotherapy-induced treatment resistance.
