= ADAM20 =

Identifiers
- Aliases: ADAM20, ADAM metallopeptidase domain 20
- External IDs: OMIM: 603712; MGI: 3045694; GeneCards: ADAM20

Gene location (Human)
Chr.	Chromosome 14 (human)
Band	14q24.2	Start	70,522,358 bp
Band	14q24.2	End	70,535,015 bp

Gene location (Mouse)
Chr.	Chromosome 8 (mouse)
Band	8|8 A4	Start	41,276,027 bp
Band	8|8 A4	End	41,280,074 bp
RNA expression pattern
Bgee	Human / Mouse (ortholog); Top expressed in: sperm; gonad; testicle; right testis; left testis; buccal mucosa cell; Achilles tendon; corpus callosum; muscle of thigh; cervix / Top expressed in: spermatid; testicle; spermatocyte; pancreas; islet of Langerhans; primary visual cortex; More reference expression data
BioGPS	n/a
Gene ontology
Molecular function	peptidase activity; metalloendopeptidase activity; hydrolase activity; metallopeptidase activity; metal ion binding
Cellular component	integral component of membrane; plasma membrane; membrane
Biological process	proteolysis; single fertilization; binding of sperm to zona pellucida
Sources:Amigo / QuickGO
Orthologs
Databases	NCBI: entry; OMA: entry
Species	Human	Mouse
Entrez	8748	546055
Ensembl	ENSG00000134007	ENSMUSG00000054033
UniProt	O43506	Q7M762
RefSeq (mRNA)	NM_003814	NM_001025380
RefSeq (protein)	NP_003805	NP_001020551
Location (UCSC)	Chr 14: 70.52 – 70.54 Mb	Chr 8: 41.28 – 41.28 Mb
PubMed search
- Wikidata
View/Edit Human	View/Edit Mouse

ADAM20, also referred to as ADAM metallopeptidase domain 20, is a testis-specific membrane metalloprotease-disintegrin protein that enhances male reproduction by helping in the formation of sperms. This molecule is expressed in human male spermatocytes and sperm cells' outer layer.

The process of mammalian fertilization requires the interaction between proteins on the surface of the sperm and the process of recognizing membranes, penetrating the extracellular matrix, and fusing the two cells. The characteristics of the ADAM20 molecule make it suitable for this job because it acts both as a protease enzyme and as a mediator between the extracellular matrix through its metalloprotease domain and disintegrin adhesion module.

Successful fertilization depends on effective molecular communication between the sperm and egg membranes. Therefore, any abnormality in ADAM protein expression in sperm may result in infertility, fertilization failure during in vitro fertilization (IVF), and sperm–egg fusion problems. Modern scientific findings suggest the importance of ADAM20 molecules as candidate genes in reproductive medicine when conventional semen parameters appear to be normal, but fertilization cannot take place.

== Gene ==
ADAM metallopeptidase domain 20 (ADAM20), also known as the ADAM20 gene, lies in the 14q24.2 locus of chromosome 14, where it encodes on the opposite strand of chromosome 14. This locus has a span of 57 kb with three exons producing the canonical transcript coding for the major human isoform. Sequence analysis found out that ADAM20 mRNA is alternatively spliced at its 5-prime untranslated region. ADAM20 is made up of 726 amino acids, and it includes a zinc-binding site of metalloproteases and cell fusion peptides for fusion.

This protein is coded by the canonical transcript as NP_003805.4, whereas the other predicted alternate transcripts have a protein coding sequence for a longer form of this protein. Only two protein coding transcripts have been identified to this date.

The compact genomic structure of ADAM20 is notable due to the many reproductive genes displaying streamlined exon organization and highly tissue-restricted promoter usage, reflecting stage-specific activation during spermiogenesis. Transcriptional regulation by postmeiotic germ-cell transcription factors is strongly suggested by the testis-specific nature of ADAM20.

== Isoforms ==
Currently, there are only two coding isoforms of ADAM20 in the forms of a canonical isoform and an alternative isoform. The canonical isoform is the primary human isoform consisting of 726 amino acids. The alternative isoform may contain modifications in extracellular spacing or transmembrane organization that can alter sperm head localization, substrate access, membrane dynamics, and interactions. These two isoforms may reflect stage-specific expression during spermatid maturation and mature sperm function.

== Structure ==
ADAM20 is a modulatory protein that comprises different functional units of the ADAM family. These include the signal peptide, the pro-domain, the metalloprotease domain, the disintegrin domain, cysteine-rich regions, the transmembrane helical domain, and the cytoplasmic domain. By means of its domains, ADAM20 is enabled to fulfill its roles as an extracellular protein with utmost efficiency.

=== Signal peptide ===
The N-terminal signal peptide serves the purpose of targeting the secretion pathway of the ER during co-translational insertion, marking the beginning of secretion pathway processing and membrane insertion.

=== Pro-domain ===
The pro-domain acts as an autoinhibitory fold region, preventing the premature activation of the metalloprotease domain through stabilization. The region uses the cysteine switch mechanism to maintain the inactive state of the metalloprotease domain.

=== Metalloprotease domain ===
The metalloprotease domain contains the catalytic zinc-binding motif (HEXGH) responsible for proteolytic activity. This region is the catalytic core of ADAM20 and likely mediates extracellular cleavage of sperm surface substrates.

=== Disintegrin domain ===
The disintegrin domain is specialized for protein–protein recognition and cell adhesion, potentially binding zona pellucida ligands or oocyte membrane receptors. Disintegrin domains in ADAM proteins are approximately 90 amino acids in length.

=== Cysteine-rich and egf-like domains ===
Cysteine-rich and EGF-like domains are extracellular modules that likely stabilize receptor-binding geometry and help orient the disintegrin loop for membrane contact. These domains complement the binding capacity of the disintegrin domain.

=== Transmembrane helix ===
The transmembrane helix is a single-pass transmembrane segment that anchors ADAM20 to the sperm plasma membrane, particularly the sperm head.

=== Cytoplasmic tail ===
The cytoplasmic tail may regulate membrane trafficking, stabilization, or signaling interactions during sperm maturation. These tails often act as PxxP binding sites for SH3 domain-containing proteins.

== Function ==
ADAM20 plays a key biological role in sperm maturation in the preparation of sperm for fertilization.

The metalloprotease domain cleaves extracellular or membrane-associated sperm proteins. This cleavage facilitates activation of sperm ligands, removal of inhibitory precursors, remodeling during capacitation, and exposure of fusion-component proteins. The catalytic zinc ion polarizes a water molecule, which then enables nucleophilic hydrolysis of peptide bonds, which is expected for ADAM proteins.

The disintegrin domain may mediate stable sperm-egg membrane docking via integrin-like receptors or zona-associated proteins. ADAM20 may help regulate surface protein redistribution before oocyte contact as sperm undergoes dramatic membrane reorganization during capacitation.

== Developmental roles ==
ADAM20 is essential for sperm maturation, binding to the zona pellucida, and sperm-egg plasma membrane fusion.

=== Sperm maturation ===
ADAM20 contributes to sperm maturation by participating in proteolytic processing and remodeling of the sperm surface which results in the maturation in the epididymis. It likely undergoes post-translational maturation during epididymal transit. The remodeling of membrane protein composition and enabling correct localization of fusion-adhesion proteins on the sperm head play key roles in sperm maturation. The prodomain regulates activation of the catalytic cycle, highlighting the role of controlled proteolytic activation.

=== Binding to the zona pellucida ===
Motifs within the disintegrin domain bind integrin receptors on the egg, mediating adhesion. This binding to zona pellucida glycoproteins is further supported by the stabilization of sperm attachment to the egg coat.

=== Sperm-egg membrane fusion ===
The cysteine-rich domain in ADAM20 encodes putative fusion peptides that participate in membrane fusion. ADAM20 localizes to the acrosome and equatorial region of sperm, the fusion site. The most likely terminal role is during oolemma docking and fusion, where catalytic remodeling and adhesion occur simultaneously. This developmental model is reinforced as mouse ortholog studies further support localization to the external side of the sperm head plasma membrane.

=== Spermatid differentiation and membrane reorganization ===
Expression in the testis and sperm suggests activation during elongating spermatid stages, when the sperm head membrane and acrosomal structures are assembled.ADAM20 likely participates in membrane reorganization near the end of maturation, associated with capacitation.

== Clinical significance ==
The strongest disease relevance for ADAM20 is male infertility, particularly unexplained fertilization failure. One clinical study linked a rare ADAM20 variant to sperm-egg fusion disorder in a male patient in China, revealing that disruption of ADAM20 can impair fertilization despite normal sperm counts. This case of infertility is likely caused by the mislocalization of the gene away from the acrosomal and equatorial regions of the sperm head, where fusion occurs.

The use as a biomarker of male infertility is promising as clinical assessments tend to evaluate sperm count and morphology, failing to identify functional defects in sperm-egg interactions. In genetic screening, abnormalities may explain situations where sperm seem functional, but then fails at the end of membrane fusion. Due to the testis-specific nature of ADAM20, it is likely a target for non-hormonal male contraception. This blocking of ADAM20 function may result in the prevention of sperm-egg fusion and avoiding systemic hormonal side effects.

== Interactions ==
ADAM20 participates in a multicomponent sperm fusion complex with likely interactions with fertilin-like ADAM proteins, IZUMO family proteins, oocyte integrin-like receptors, and zona pellucida components. It likely interacts with fertilin-like proteins which are essential to regulation of sperm-egg adhesion. Possible interactions with fusion proteins like those in the IZUMO family may help stabilize membrane contact before fusion pore formation. The disintegrin loop suggests binding to integrin-like proteins on the oolemma prior to fertilization. Zona pellucida glycoproteins likely interact with ADAM20 during sperm penetration and zona binding.

== History ==
ADAM20 was first identified in 1998 by Rob Hooft van Huijsduijnen during cDNA library screening of human testis tissue. The intention of the study was to discover novel fertilin-like metalloproteases. Hooft van Huijsduijnen’s research also described the ADAM20 and ADAM21 genes as human testis-specific membrane metalloproteases with similarity to fertilin-α, suggesting a role in reproduction. It was suggested that both ADAM genes arose by gene duplication after analysis of a radiation hybrid panel.

The importance of this finding was further emphasized by earlier associations of fertilin-like ADAM proteins in gamete adhesion and fusion via the disintegrin domain outside of the cell. It was found through sequence analysis that ADAM20 retained the zinc-coordinating motif needed for enzyme function, thus differentiating it from other reproductive ADAM proteins, which were non-catalytic in nature.

Research on the reproductive ADAM protein known as ADAM20 was conducted between the 1990s and 2010s and was rather limited in comparison to other ADAM enzymes such as ADAM10 and ADAM17. With renewed interest in reproductive genomics and sperm proteomics, there came more research on ADAM20, particularly in regard to its role in the sperm membrane. The most recent research regarding human infertility through whole genome sequencing has identified the mutations of ADAM20.

== Possible future research ==
Directions for future research are likely to expand to cover clinical translational research, biotechnology, and molecular mechanisms. While the disintegrin domain and cysteine-rich domains suggest roles in adhesion and fusion, the exact binding partners on the oocyte membrane remain uncertain. Future research using CRISPR-based gene editing, protein-protein interaction mapping, and imaging could help determine whether ADAM20 is a primary fusogen or part of a larger multiprotein complex. The identification of genetic variants of ADAM20 across human populations in correlation with infertility would be another important direction for research. Limited cases demonstrated that mutations were responsible for failed sperm-egg fusion. Larger scale clinical sequencing could determine how frequently ADAM20 variants contribute to unexplained male infertility. Functional assays would be necessary to distinguish between benign and pathogenic mutations affecting protein function.
