= ADAM18 =

Protein-coding gene in humans

Identifiers
- Aliases: ADAM18, ADAM27, tMDCIII, ADAM metallopeptidase domain 18
- External IDs: MGI: 105986; GeneCards: ADAM18

Gene location (Human)
Chr.	Chromosome 8 (human)
Band	8p11.22	Start	39,584,489 bp
Band	8p11.22	End	39,730,065 bp

Gene location (Mouse)
Chr.	Chromosome 8 (mouse)
Band	8|8 A2	Start	25,092,262 bp
Band	8|8 A2	End	25,164,771 bp
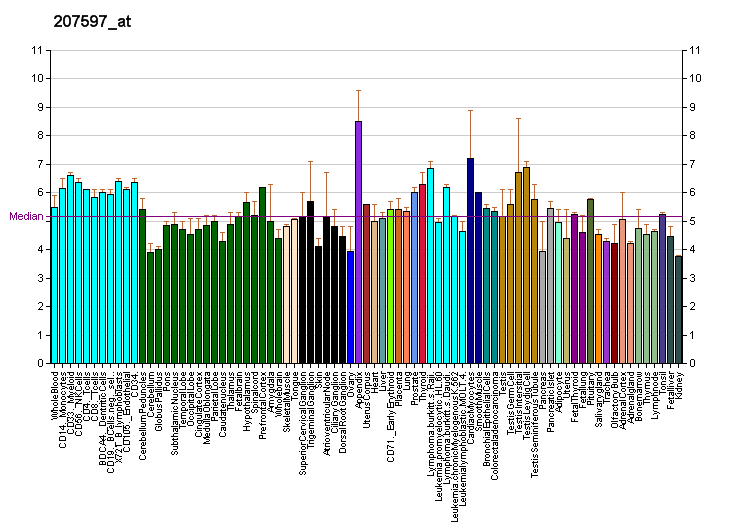
RNA expression pattern
Bgee	Human / Mouse (ortholog); Top expressed in: testicle; left testis; right testis; testicle; gonad; monocyte; right coronary artery; apex of heart; left ventricle; urinary bladder / Top expressed in: spermatocyte; spermatid; seminiferous tubule; visual cortex; primary visual cortex; superior frontal gyrus; islet of Langerhans; somite; More reference expression data
BioGPS	More reference expression data
Gene ontology
Molecular function	metalloendopeptidase activity; metallopeptidase activity
Cellular component	integral component of membrane; membrane
Biological process	multicellular organism development; cell differentiation; spermatogenesis; proteolysis
Sources:Amigo / QuickGO
Orthologs
Databases	NCBI: entry; OMA: entry
Species	Human	Mouse
Entrez	8749	13524
Ensembl	ENSG00000168619; ENSG00000278548	ENSMUSG00000031552
UniProt	Q9Y3Q7	Q9R157
RefSeq (mRNA)	NM_001190956; NM_014237; NM_001320313	NM_010084
RefSeq (protein)	NP_001177885; NP_001307242; NP_055052	NP_034214
Location (UCSC)	Chr 8: 39.58 – 39.73 Mb	Chr 8: 25.09 – 25.16 Mb
PubMed search
- Wikidata
View/Edit Human	View/Edit Mouse

Disintegrin and metalloproteinase domain-containing protein 18 is an enzyme that in humans is encoded by the ADAM18 gene.

This gene encodes a member of the ADAM (a disintegrin and metalloprotease domain) family. Members of this family are membrane-anchored proteins structurally related to snake venom disintegrins, and have been implicated in a variety of biologic processes involving cell-cell and cell-matrix interactions, including fertilization, muscle development, and neurogenesis. The protein encoded by this gene is a sperm surface protein.
