= Trimerelysin I =

Class of enzymes

Identifiers
- EC no.: 3.4.24.52
- CAS no.: 151125-16-5

Databases
- IntEnz: IntEnz view
- BRENDA: BRENDA entry
- ExPASy: NiceZyme view
- KEGG: KEGG entry
- MetaCyc: metabolic pathway
- PRIAM: profile
- PDB structures: RCSB PDB PDBe PDBsum
Search
- PMC: articles
- PubMed: articles
- NCBI: proteins

Trimerelysin I (EC 3.4.24.52, Trimeresurus metalloendopeptidase I, hemorrhagic proteinase HR1A, hemorrhagic metalloproteinase HR1A, metalloproteinase HR1A) is an enzyme. This enzyme catalyses the following chemical reaction

Cleavage of only two bonds His^{10}-Leu and Ala^{14}-Leu in the insulin B chain

This endopeptidase is present in the venom of the habu snake (Trimeresurus flavoviridis).
