= Single-pass membrane protein =

Protein emerging once on each face of a lipid bilayer

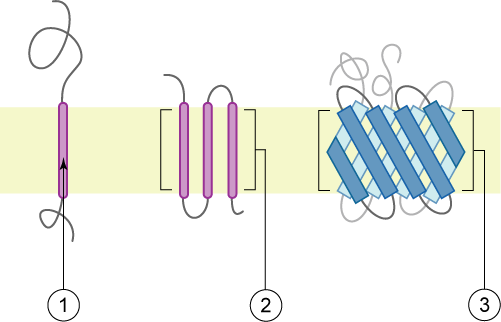
Schematic representation of transmembrane proteins: 1. a protein with single transmembrane α-helix (a single-pass membrane protein) (bitopic) 2. a polytopic transmembrane α-helical protein 3. a polytopic transmembrane β-sheet protein The membrane is represented in yellow.

A single-pass membrane protein also known as single-spanning protein or bitopic protein is a transmembrane protein that spans the lipid bilayer only once. These proteins may constitute up to 50% of all transmembrane proteins, depending on the organism, and contribute significantly to the network of interactions between different proteins in cells, including interactions via transmembrane alpha helices. They usually include one or several water-soluble protein domains situated at the different sides of biological membranes, for example in single-pass transmembrane receptors. Some of them are small and serve as regulatory or structure-stabilizing subunits in large multi-protein transmembrane complexes, such as photosystems or the respiratory chain. More than 2300 single-pass membrane proteins have been identified in the human genome.

== Topology-based classification ==
Bitopic proteins are classified into four types, depending on their transmembrane topology and location of the transmembrane helix in the amino acid sequence of the protein. According to Uniprot:

- Type I: N-terminus on the extracellular side of the membrane; removed signal peptide
- Type II: N-terminus on the cytoplasmic side of the membrane; transmembrane helix located close to the N-terminus, where it works as an anchor
- Type III: N-terminus on the extracellular side of the membrane; no signal peptide
- Type IV: N-terminus on the cytoplasmic side of the membrane; transmembrane helix located close to the C-terminus, where it works as an anchor

Hence type I proteins are anchored to the lipid membrane with a stop-transfer anchor sequence and have their N-terminal domains targeted to the ER lumen during synthesis. Type II and III are anchored with a signal-anchor sequence, with type II being targeted to the ER lumen with its C-terminal domain, while type III have their N-terminal domains targeted to the ER lumen.

== Structure ==
A single-pass transmembrane protein typically consists of three domains, the extracellular domain, the transmembrane domain, and the intracellular domain. The transmembrane domain is the smallest at around 25 amino acid residues and forms an alpha helix inserted into the membrane bilayer. The ECD is typically much larger than the ICD and is often globular, whereas many ICDs have relatively high disorder. Some proteins in this class function as monomers, but dimerization or higher-order oligomerization is common.

== Evolution ==
The number of single-pass transmembrane proteins in an organism's genome varies significantly. It is higher in eukaryotes than prokaryotes and in multicellular than unicellular organisms. The fraction of proteins in this class is larger in humans than in the model organisms Danio rerio (zebrafish) and Caenorhabditis elegans (nematode worms), suggesting that genes encoding these proteins have undergone expansion in the vertebrate and mammalian lineages.

== Databases ==
- Membranome database is a database of bitopic proteins from several model organisms.
- Bitopic proteins in OPM database
