= ADAM2 =

Protein-coding gene in humans

Identifiers
- Aliases: ADAM2, CRYN1, CRYN2, CT15, FTNB, PH-30b, PH30, PH30-beta, ADAM metallopeptidase domain 2
- External IDs: OMIM: 601533; MGI: 1340894; GeneCards: ADAM2

Gene location (Human)
Chr.	Chromosome 8 (human)
Band	8p11.22	Start	39,743,735 bp
Band	8p11.22	End	39,838,227 bp

Gene location (Mouse)
Chr.	Chromosome 14 (mouse)
Band	14 D1|14 34.36 cM	Start	66,264,778 bp
Band	14 D1|14 34.36 cM	End	66,315,182 bp
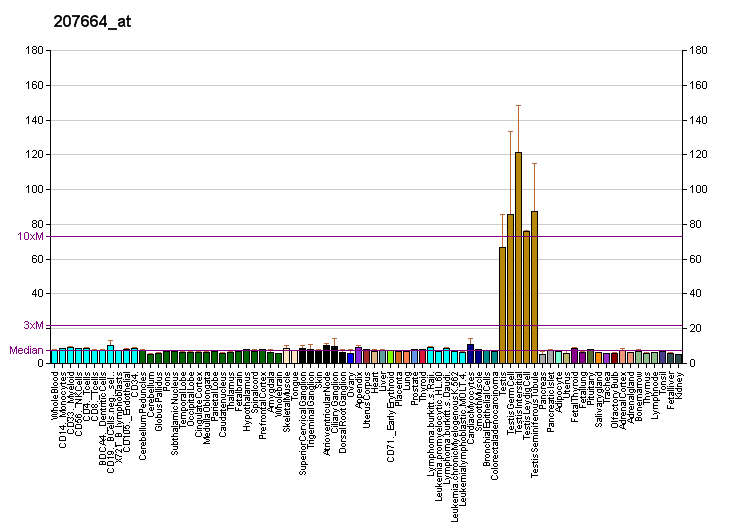
RNA expression pattern
Bgee	Human / Mouse (ortholog); Top expressed in: testicle; left testis; right testis; testicle; gonad; placenta; myeloid leukocyte; monocyte; prostate; appendix / Top expressed in: spermatocyte; spermatid; seminiferous tubule; morula; blastocyst; duodenum; neural tube; endocrine system; islet of Langerhans; digastric muscle; More reference expression data
BioGPS	More reference expression data
Gene ontology
Molecular function	integrin binding; metalloendopeptidase activity; metallopeptidase activity
Cellular component	integral component of membrane; cell surface; plasma membrane; integral component of plasma membrane; membrane; protein-containing complex
Biological process	visual learning; fusion of sperm to egg plasma membrane involved in single fertilization; cell adhesion; adult behavior; proteolysis; binding of sperm to zona pellucida; single fertilization; positive regulation of gene expression
Sources:Amigo / QuickGO
Orthologs
Databases	NCBI: entry; OMA: entry
Species	Human	Mouse
Entrez	2515	11495
Ensembl	ENSG00000104755; ENSG00000276286	ENSMUSG00000022039
UniProt	Q99965	Q60718
RefSeq (mRNA)	NM_001278113; NM_001278114; NM_001464	NM_009618
RefSeq (protein)	NP_001265042; NP_001265043; NP_001455	NP_033748
Location (UCSC)	Chr 8: 39.74 – 39.84 Mb	Chr 14: 66.26 – 66.32 Mb
PubMed search
- Wikidata
View/Edit Human	View/Edit Mouse

Disintegrin and metalloproteinase domain-containing protein 2 or Beta-fertilin is an enzyme that in humans is encoded by the ADAM2 gene.

== Function ==
This gene encodes a member of the ADAM (a disintegrin and metalloprotease domain) family. Members of this family are membrane-anchored proteins structurally related to snake venom disintegrins, and have been implicated in a variety of biological processes involving cell–cell and cell–matrix interactions, including fertilization, muscle development, and neurogenesis. This member is a subunit of an integral sperm membrane heterodimer glycoprotein called fertilin, which plays an important role in sperm-egg interactions. The other subunit is ADAM1 or alpha-fertilin.
