= Disintegrin =

Proteins from viper venom inhibiting platelets aggregation

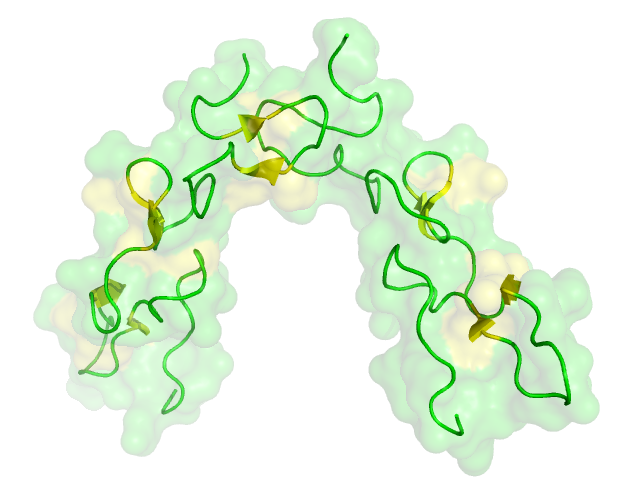
- Structure of disintegrin heterodimer from Echis carinatus

Identifiers
- Symbol: Disintegrin
- Pfam: PF00200
- InterPro: IPR001762
- PROSITE: PDOC00351
- SCOP2: 1kst / SCOPe / SUPFAM
- OPM superfamily: 227
- OPM protein: 2ao7
- Membranome: 538
Available protein structures:
- PDB: IPR001762 PF00200 (ECOD; PDBsum)
- AlphaFold: IPR001762; PF00200

Disintegrins are a family of small proteins (45–84 amino acids in length) from viper venoms that function as potent inhibitors of both platelet aggregation and integrin-dependent cell adhesion.

== Operation ==
Disintegrins work by countering the blood clotting steps, inhibiting the clumping of platelets. They interact with the beta-1 and -3 families of integrins receptors. Integrins are cell receptors involved in cell–cell and cell–extracellular matrix interactions, serving as the final common pathway leading to aggregation via formation of platelet–platelet bridges, which are essential in thrombosis and haemostasis. Disintegrins contain an RGD (Arg-Gly-Asp) or KGD (Lys-Gly-Asp) sequence motif that binds specifically to integrin IIb-IIIa receptors on the platelet surface, thereby blocking the binding of fibrinogen to the receptor–glycoprotein complex of activated platelets. Disintegrins act as receptor antagonists, inhibiting aggregation induced by ADP, thrombin, platelet-activating factor and collagen. The role of disintegrin in preventing blood coagulation renders it of medical interest, particularly with regard to its use as an anti-coagulant.

== Types of disintegrin ==
Disintegrins from different snake species have been characterised: albolabrin, applagin, barbourin, batroxostatin, bitistatin, obtustatin, schistatin, echistatin, elegantin, eristicophin, flavoridin, halysin, kistrin, mojastin (Crotalus scutulatus), rubistatin (Crotalus ruber), tergeminin, salmosin, tzabcanin (Crotalus simus tzabcan) and triflavin.

Disintegrins are split into 5 classes: small, medium, large, dimeric, and snake venom metalloproteinases.

Small Disintegrins: 49-51 amino acids, 4 disulfide bonds
Medium Disintegrins: 70 amino acids, 6 disulfide bonds
Large Disintegrins: 84 amino acids, 7 disulfide bonds
Dimeric Disintegrins: 67 amino acids, 4 intra-chain disulfide bonds
Snake Venom Metalloproteinases: 100 amino acids, 8 disulfide bond

== Evolution of disintegrin family ==
Disintegrins evolved via gene duplication of an ancestral protein family, the ADAM family. Small, medium, large, and dimeric disintegrin family are found only in the family Viperidae, suggesting duplication and diversification about 12-20 million years ago. Snake venom metalloproteinases are found through the entire superfamily Colubroidea, suggesting that they evolved before Colubroidea diversified roughly 60 million years ago.

== Other sources of disintegrin proteins ==
Disintegrin-like proteins are found in various species ranging from slime mold to humans. Some other proteins known to contain a disintegrin domain are:

- Some snake venom zinc metalloproteinases consist of an N-terminal catalytic domain fused to a disintegrin domain. Such is the case for trimerelysin I (HR1B), atrolysin E (Ht-e) and trigramin. It has been suggested that these proteinases are able to cleave themselves from the disintegrin domains and that the latter may arise from such a post-translational processing.
- ADAM and ADAMTS protein families, which include important protease enzymes.
  - The secreted protease ADAMTS13, found in serum, cleaves Von Willebrand factor and acts as a natural, endogenous inhibitor of platelet adhesion and aggregation.
  - ADAM2 (beta-fertilin, the beta-subunit of guinea pig sperm surface protein PH30). PH30 is a protein involved in sperm-egg fusion. The beta subunit contains a disintegrin at the N-terminal extremity.
  - ADAM7 (Mammalian epididymial apical protein 1, EAP I). ADAM7 is associated with the sperm membrane and may play a role in sperm maturation. Structurally, ADAM7 consists of an N-terminal domain, followed by a zinc metalloproteinase domain, a disintegrin domain, and a large C-terminal domain that contains a transmembrane region.

== See also ==
- ADAM Protein
- Evolution of snake venom
