= APLP2 =

Protein-coding gene in the species Homo sapiens

Identifiers
- Aliases: APLP2, APLP-2, APPH, APPL2, CDEBP, amyloid beta precursor like protein 2
- External IDs: OMIM: 104776; MGI: 88047; HomoloGene: 20396; GeneCards: APLP2; OMA:APLP2 - orthologs

Gene location (Human)
Chr.	Chromosome 11 (human)
Band	11q24.3	Start	130,068,147 bp
Band	11q24.3	End	130,144,811 bp

Gene location (Mouse)
Chr.	Chromosome 9 (mouse)
Band	9 A4|9 16.66 cM	Start	31,060,853 bp
Band	9 A4|9 16.66 cM	End	31,123,111 bp
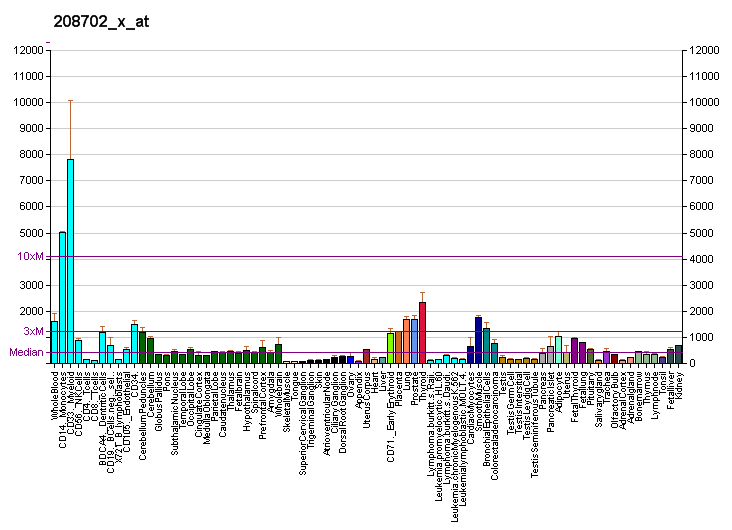

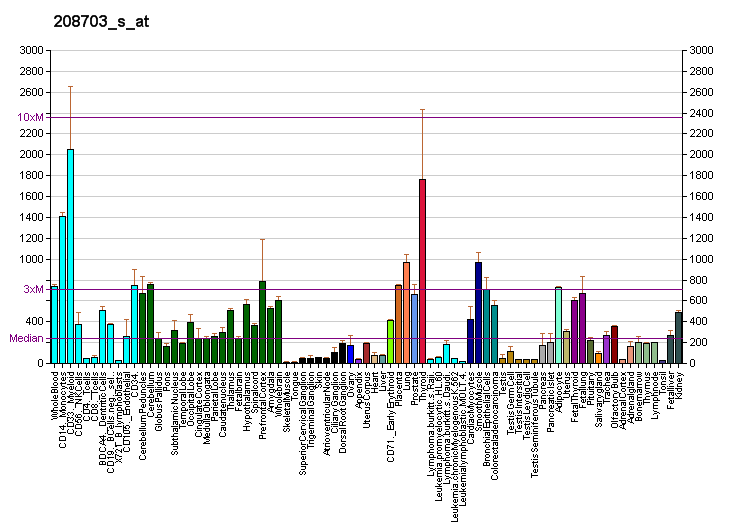

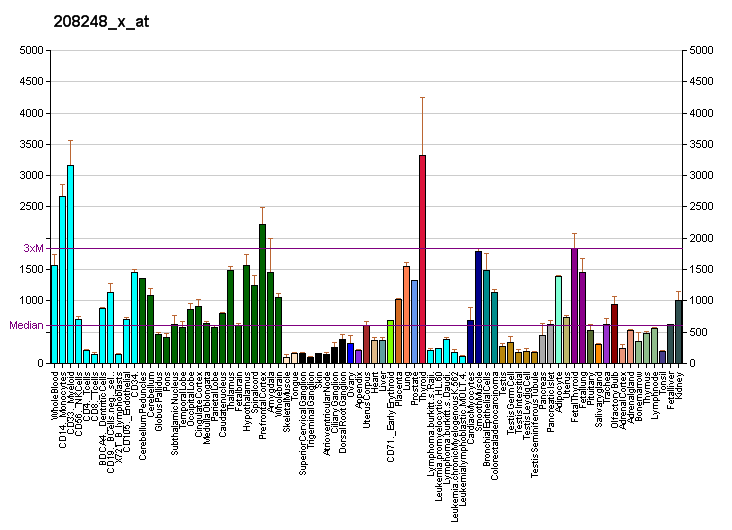
RNA expression pattern
Bgee	Human / Mouse (ortholog); Top expressed in: renal medulla; Epithelium of choroid plexus; trigeminal ganglion; internal globus pallidus; monocyte; lower lobe of lung; Descending thoracic aorta; synovial joint; spinal ganglia; left lobe of thyroid gland / Top expressed in: neural layer of retina; ciliary body; cerebellar cortex; cerebellar vermis; medial dorsal nucleus; lobe of cerebellum; lateral geniculate nucleus; medial geniculate nucleus; olfactory epithelium; white adipose tissue; More reference expression data
BioGPS	More reference expression data
Gene ontology
Molecular function	peptidase inhibitor activity; DNA binding; transition metal ion binding; heparin binding; protein binding; serine-type endopeptidase inhibitor activity; identical protein binding; metal ion binding
Cellular component	integral component of membrane; extracellular exosome; membrane; nucleus; platelet alpha granule membrane; plasma membrane; endoplasmic reticulum lumen
Biological process	G protein-coupled receptor signaling pathway; negative regulation of peptidase activity; negative regulation of endopeptidase activity; platelet degranulation; post-translational protein modification
Sources:Amigo / QuickGO
Orthologs
Species	Human	Mouse
Entrez	334	11804
Ensembl	ENSG00000084234	ENSMUSG00000031996
UniProt	Q06481	Q06335
RefSeq (mRNA)	NM_001142276; NM_001142277; NM_001142278; NM_001243299; NM_001642 NM_001328682; NM_001328684; NM_001328685; NM_001328686	NM_001102455; NM_001102456; NM_009691; NM_001357698
RefSeq (protein)	NP_001135748; NP_001135749; NP_001135750; NP_001230228; NP_001315611 NP_001315613; NP_001315614; NP_001315615; NP_001633; NP_001369455; NP_001369456; NP_001369457; NP_001369458; NP_001369459; NP_001369460; NP_001369461; NP_001369462; NP_001369463; NP_001369464; NP_001369465; NP_001369466; NP_001369467; NP_001369468; NP_001369469; NP_001369470; NP_001369471; NP_001369472; NP_001369473; NP_001369474; NP_001369475	NP_001095925; NP_001095926; NP_033821; NP_001344627
Location (UCSC)	Chr 11: 130.07 – 130.14 Mb	Chr 9: 31.06 – 31.12 Mb
PubMed search
- Wikidata
View/Edit Human	View/Edit Mouse

Amyloid precursor like protein 2, also known as APLP2, is a protein encoded by the APLP2 gene in humans. APLP2 along with APLP1 are important modulators of glucose and insulin homeostasis.

== Gene location ==
The human APLP2 gene is located on the long (q) arm of chromosome 11 at region 2 band 4, from base pair 130, 069, 821 to base pair 130, 144, 811 (GRCh38.p7).

== Protein structure ==
APLP2 consists of 763 amino acids, with 31 amino acids making up the signal peptide and 732 amino acids making up the chain of the protein.

=== Extracellular domain ===
The extracellular domain (residues 32-692) contains the E1 domain, E2 domain, and BPTI/Kunitz inhibitor domain. The E1 domain contains two independent folding units, the growth factor-like domain (GFLD) and the copper-binding domain (CuBD). GFLD has a highly charged basic surface and a highly flexible region consisting of an N-terminal loop formed by a disulphide bridge. CuBD consists of an alpha-helix that is tightly packed on a triple-stranded beta-sheet.

The E2 domain is the largest subdomain of APLP2 and consists of six alpha-helixes. The N-terminal double stranded coiled coil structure of the first monomer of E2 packs against the C-terminal triple stranded coiled coil structure of the second monomer.

The BPTI/Kunitz inhibitor domain (residues 306-364) is ‘Cys-rich’ and is capable of inhibiting several proteases.

The ectodomain of APLP2 is dimeric and contains multiple binding sites for metal ions and components of the extracellular matrix. These bindings site can bind copper, zinc, collagen and heparan sulfate.

=== Transmembrane region ===
The transmembrane region of APLP2 (residues 693-716) is helical in structure.

=== Cytoplasmic domain ===
The cytoplasmic domain (resides 717-763) contains a YENPTY sequence suggesting a duel function of the domain. The NPxY motif can function as a signal for endocytosis or the sequence can function to mediate binding of various interactive partners.

== Function ==
APLP2 associates with antigen presentation molecules like MHC class I molecules and regulates their surface expression by enhancing endocytosis.

APLP1 and APLP2 double knockout mice display hypoglycemia and hyperinsulinemia indicating that these two proteins are important modulators of glucose and insulin homeostasis. APLP2 has also been shown to regulate development of the brain by regulating migration and differentiation of neural stem cells.

Double mice knock outs of APLP2 and its homologues, APP and APLP1 have shown a strong indication that APLP2 has the key physiological role among the family members. APLP2/APP double knock out mice and APLP2/APLP1 double knock out mice each show a lethal phenotype (postnatal day 1), whereas APLP1/APP double knock out mice are apparently normal, demonstrating the importance of the APLP2 protein.

APLP2 plays a role in synaptic plasticity, functioning to promote neurite outgrowth, neural cell migration and copper homeostasis. Analysing the neurons and networks of APP/APLP2 double knock out mice using stem cell-derived neurons and slice cultures, shows deficient excitatory synaptic transmission in this genotype. Moreover, APLP2 together with APP has been demonstrated to exhibit presynaptic and postsynaptic functions in synaptogenesis and maintenance of synapses.

APLP2 has shown to act as a cargo receptor in axonal transport for intact proteins.

== Clinical significance ==
APLP2 is part of a family of mammalian membrane proteins along with APLP1 and amyloid precursor protein (APP). Since APP plays a key role in the molecular pathology of Alzheimer’s disease (AD), it has been hypothesized that APLP2 also plays a role in AD pathogenesis. The amyloid β peptide (Aβ) that is present on APP has been shown to cause neurotoxic effects leading to AD. Although the Aβ sequence is not present on APLP2, it has been suggested that APLP2 and APP share a functional redundancy whereby both proteins interplay with one another to exhibit physiological functions to do with synapse formation.

== Interactions ==
APLP2 has been shown to interact with APBB1.
