= APLP1 =

Protein-coding gene in the species Homo sapiens

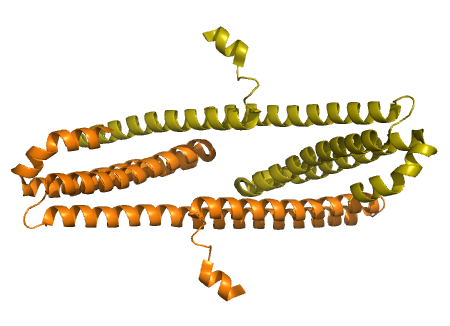

Identifiers
- Aliases: APLP1, APLP, amyloid beta precursor like protein 1
- External IDs: OMIM: 104775; MGI: 88046; GeneCards: APLP1
Available structures
PDB	Ortholog search: PDBe RCSB
PDB	List of PDB id codes 3PMR, 3Q7G, 3Q7L, 3QMK, 4RD9, 4RDA

Gene location (Human)
Chr.	Chromosome 19 (human)
Band	19q13.12	Start	35,867,899 bp
Band	19q13.12	End	35,879,792 bp

Gene location (Mouse)
Chr.	Chromosome 7 (mouse)
Band	7 B1|7 18.32 cM	Start	30,134,407 bp
Band	7 B1|7 18.32 cM	End	30,144,960 bp
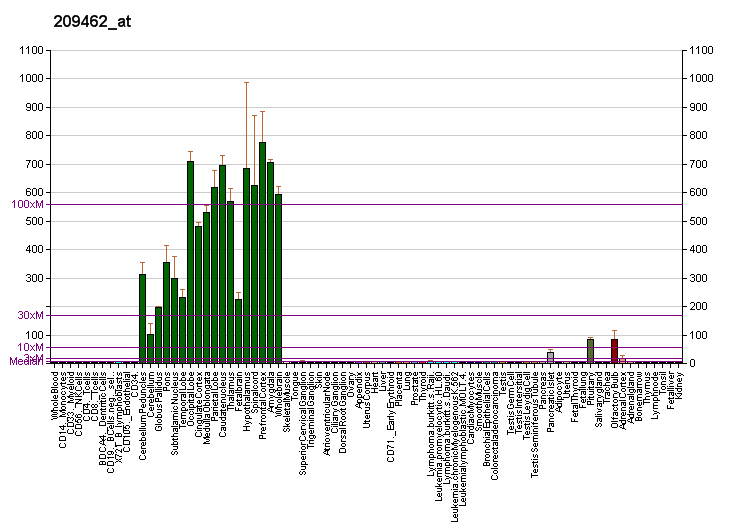
RNA expression pattern
Bgee	Human / Mouse (ortholog); Top expressed in: C1 segment; inferior olivary nucleus; middle frontal gyrus; right frontal lobe; prefrontal cortex; caudate nucleus; nucleus accumbens; dorsal motor nucleus of vagus nerve; amygdala; hypothalamus / Top expressed in: nucleus accumbens; nucleus of stria terminalis; piriform cortex; molar; subiculum; olfactory tubercle; central gray substance of midbrain; globus pallidus; primary visual cortex; superior colliculus; More reference expression data
BioGPS	More reference expression data
Gene ontology
Molecular function	alpha-2C adrenergic receptor binding; heparin binding; alpha-2B adrenergic receptor binding; metal ion binding; protein binding; alpha-2A adrenergic receptor binding; identical protein binding; transition metal ion binding
Cellular component	cytoplasm; integral component of membrane; membrane; plasma membrane; basement membrane; perinuclear region of cytoplasm
Biological process	endocytosis; nervous system development; cellular response to norepinephrine stimulus; cell adhesion; animal organ morphogenesis; apoptotic process; negative regulation of adenylate cyclase-activating G protein-coupled receptor signaling pathway
Sources:Amigo / QuickGO
Orthologs
Databases	NCBI: entry; OMA: entry
Species	Human	Mouse
Entrez	333	11803
Ensembl	ENSG00000105290	ENSMUSG00000006651
UniProt	P51693	Q03157
RefSeq (mRNA)	NM_005166; NM_001024807	NM_007467
RefSeq (protein)	NP_001019978; NP_005157	NP_031493
Location (UCSC)	Chr 19: 35.87 – 35.88 Mb	Chr 7: 30.13 – 30.14 Mb
PubMed search
- Wikidata
View/Edit Human	View/Edit Mouse

Amyloid precursor like protein 1, also known as APLP1, is a protein encoded by the APLP1 gene in humans. APLP1 along with APLP2 are important modulators of glucose and insulin homeostasis.

== Function ==
This gene encodes a member of the highly conserved amyloid precursor protein gene family. The encoded protein is a membrane-associated glycoprotein that is cleaved by secretases in a manner similar to amyloid beta A4 precursor protein cleavage. This cleavage liberates an intracellular cytoplasmic fragment that may act as a transcriptional activator. The encoded protein may also play a role in synaptic maturation during cortical development. Alternatively spliced transcript variants encoding different isoforms have been described.

APLP1 and APLP2 double knockout mice display hypoglycemia and hyperinsulinemia indicating that these two proteins are important modulators of glucose and insulin homeostasis.

APLP1 has also been implicated in the transmission pathologic α-synuclein in Parkinson's disease
