= Geoffrey M. Cooper =

American biologist

- Education: University of Miami
- Scientific career
- Workplaces: Boston University

Geoffrey M. Cooper is professor of biology at Boston University. He served as chair of the department of biology for a number of years, and subsequently as associate dean of the faculty for the natural sciences in the university's college of arts & sciences.

Cooper earned his Ph.D. at the University of Miami in 1973, and was a postdoctoral fellow with nobel laureate, Howard Temin. His work includes cellular growth control, cancer, and signal transduction. More specifically, he focuses on "the roles of proto-oncogene proteins as elements of signal transduction pathways that control proliferation, differentiation, and survival of mammalian cells." He is also the author of the textbook "The Cell".

Cooper’s first novel, a medical thriller titled “The Prize”, was published in January 2018.

== Publications ==
- Terragni J*, Graham JR*, Adams KW, Schaffer ME, Tullai JW, Cooper GM. 2008. Phosphatidylinositol 3-kinase signaling in proliferating cells maintains an anti-apoptotic transcriptional program mediated by inhibition of FOXO and non-canonical activation of NFkappaB transcription factors. BMC Cell Biol. Jan 28;9:6
- Adams, K.W., and Cooper, G.M. 2007. Rapid turnover of Mcl-1 couples translation to cell survival and apoptosis. J. Biol. Chem. 282:6192-6200.
- Tullai, J.W., Chen, J., Schaffer, M.E., Kamenetsky, E., Kasif, S. and Cooper, G.M. 2007. GSK-3b mediates repression of CREB target genes in quiescent cells. J. Biol. Chem. 282:9482-9491.
- Tullai, J.W., Schaffer, M.E., Mullenbrock, S., Kasif, S., and Cooper, G.M. 2004. Identification of transcription factor binding sites upstream of human genes regulated by the phosphatidylinositol 3-kinase and MEK/ERK signaling pathways. J. Biol. Chem. 279: 20167-20177.
- Pagon, Z., Volker, J., Cooper, G.M., and Hansen, U. 2003. Mammalian transcription factor LSF is a target of ERK signaling. J. Cell. Biochem. 89:733-746.
- Hartley, D. and Cooper, G.M. 2002. The role of mTOR in the degradation of IRS-1: regulation of PP2A activity. J. Cell. Biochem. 85:304-314.
- Pap, M., and Cooper, G.M. 2002. Role of translation initiation factor 2B in control of cell survival by the phosphatidylinositol 3-kinase/Akt/glycogen synthase kinase-3b pathway. Mol. Cell. Biol. 22:578-586.
- Hartley, D. and Cooper, G.M. 2000. Direct binding and activation of STAT transcription factors by the herpesvirus saimiri protein Tip. J. Biol. Chem. 275:16925-16932.
- Lin, H., Jurk, M., Gulick, T., and Cooper, G.M. 1999. Identification of COUP-TF as a transcriptional repressor of the c-mos proto-oncogene. J. Biol. Chem. 274:36796-36800.
- Erhardt, P., Schremser, E.J., and Cooper, G.M. 1999. B-Raf inhibits programmed cell death downstream of cytochrome c release from mitochondria by activating the MEK/Erk pathway. Mol. Cell. Biol. 19:5308-5315.
- Pap, M., and Cooper, G.M. 1998. Role of glycogen synthase kinase-3 in the phosphatidylinositol 3-kinase/Akt cell survival pathway. J. Biol. Chem. 273:19929-19932.
- Dudek, H., Datta, S.R., Franke, T.F., Birnbaum, M.J., Yao, R., Cooper, G.M., Segal, R.A., Kaplan, D.R., and Greenberg, M.E. 1997. Regulation of neuronal survival by the Ser/Thr protein kinase Akt. Science 275:661-665.
- Erhardt, P., Tomaselli, K.J., and Cooper, G.M. 1997. Identification of the MDM2 oncoproteinas a substrate for CPP32-like apoptotic proteases. J. Biol. Chem. 272:15049-15052.
- Lopes, U.G., Yao, R., and Cooper, G.M. 1997. p53-dependent induction of apoptosis by proteasome inhibitors. J. Biol. Chem. 272:12893-12896.
- Xu, W., and Cooper, G.M. 1995. Identification of a candidate c-mos repressor that restricts transcription of germ cell-specific genes. Mol. Cell. Biol. 15:5369-5375.
- Yao, R., and Cooper, G.M. 1995. Requirement for phosphatidylinositol-3 kinase in the prevention of apoptosis by nerve growth factor. Science 267:2003-2006.
