= William Van Nostrand =

American scientist

- Known for: The first to purify and characterize amyloid precursor protein (APP)

Academic background
- Education: B.S., Stony Brook University; Ph.D., Biological Sciences, University of California, Irvine

Academic work
- Discipline: Neuroscience
- Institutions: University of Rhode Island; Stony Brook University; University of California, Irvine
- Website: https://ryaninstitute.uri.edu/van-nostrand-lab/

William Van Nostrand is the co-director for the George & Anne Ryan Institute for Neuroscience, and Herrmann Professor of Neuroscience at the Department of Biomedical and Pharmaceutical Sciences, The University of Rhode Island.
