= Calsyntenin =

Type of transmembrane protein

Identifiers
- Symbol: CLSTN
- InterPro: IPR026914
- Membranome: 241
Available protein structures:
- PDB: IPR026914
- AlphaFold: IPR026914

Calsyntenins (Csts, CLSTN) are type I transmembrane proteins that belong to the cadherin superfamily. Their name comes from their ability to bind calcium. In birds and mammals, they consist of three family members (Cst1, 2 and 3), in nematodes one ortholog (CASY-1, originally CDH11) is known.

Cst1 (CLSTN1) was first shown to be predominantly expressed in postsynaptic membranes of excitatory neurons, Cst2 and 3 were found in an increased manner in inhibitory GABAergic neurons, in adult and embryonic tissue. Calsyntenins interact with numerous proteins such as with kinesin-1 and the APP-linker protein X11L/Mint2, and were shown to have multi-purpose functions both within and outside the nervous system.

Shortly after the calsyntenins were discovered, they were found to regulate postsynaptic calcium concentration. Later it was found that another key-function is to link vesicles to kinesin light chain (KLC) and thus to co-determine transport of distinct cargo. Recent studies identified a role for calsyntenin 1 in the regulation of vesicular trafficking of guidance receptors in dI1 axons at choice points. In cooperation with RabGDI (Guanosine nucleotide dissociation inhibitor), calsyntenin 1 shuttles Rab11-positive vesicles containing Robo1 to the growth cone surface in a precisely regulated manner. By contrast, calsyntenin 1-mediated trafficking of frizzled 3, a guidance receptor in the Wnt pathway, is independent of RabGDI. Calsyntenin gene expression also elevates during oxidative stress in PC12 cells
