= Ulla Hansen =

American biologist

- Born: Ulla Hansen; 10 February 1953 (age 72); Milwaukee, Wisconsin, United States
- Died: 23 January 2025 (aged 71)
- Education: PhD, Harvard University
- Occupation: Biologist
- Website: Ulla Hansen - Boston University Ulla Hansen - Lab website

Ulla Hansen is a professor emerita of biology at Boston University. Her research group focuses on the study of transcription factor LSF (also known as TFCP2).

== Biography ==
Hansen received her bachelor's degree in 1974 from Oberlin College and her Ph.D. in 1980 from Harvard University, where she worked with William R. McClure. She then held a postdoctoral fellowship at the Massachusetts Institute of Technology with Phillip A. Sharp. She became an assistant professor at Harvard Medical School in 1983, and moved to the department of biology at Boston University in 1998. She served as associate chair of the department for five years and as the director of the Graduate Program of Molecular Biology, Biochemistry, and Cell Biology.

== Research ==
Hansen's research specialty is the mammalian cell cycle, in particular the role of transcription factors. She has concentrated on the LSF transcription factor, which is involved in oncogenesis. She has had a particular interest in LSF's role in liver cancer. Hansen coauthored several heavily cited papers, including the review article "Active repression mechanisms of eukaryotic transcription repressors" in Trends in Genetics.
