= CDH11 =

Protein-coding gene in humans

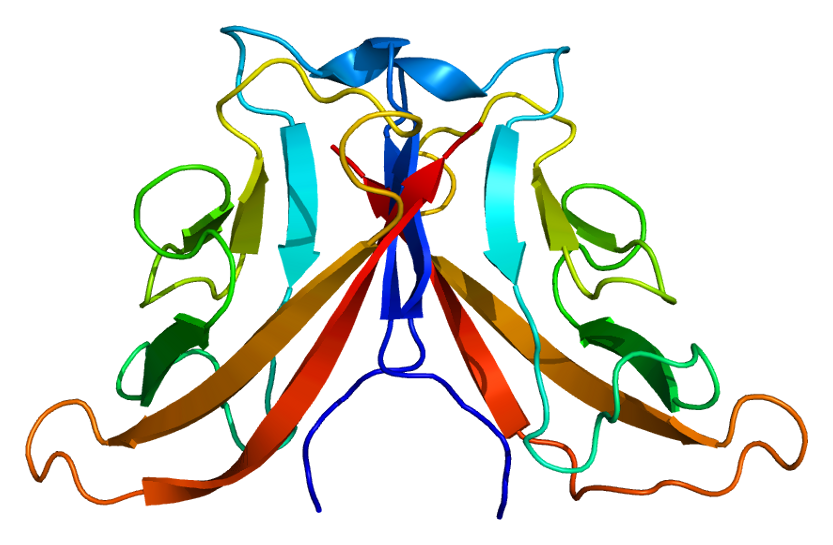

Identifiers
- Aliases: CDH11, CAD11, CDHOB, OB, OSF-4, cadherin 11, ESWS, TBHS2
- External IDs: OMIM: 600023; MGI: 99217; GeneCards: CDH11
Available structures
| PDB | Ortholog search: PDBe RCSB |
| PDB | List of PDB id codes 2A4C, 2A4E |

Gene location (Human)
| Chr. | Chromosome 16 (human) |
| Band | 16q21 | Start | 64,943,753 bp |
| Band | 16q21 | End | 65,126,112 bp |

Gene location (Mouse)
| Chr. | Chromosome 8 (mouse) |
| Band | 8 D1|8 50.44 cM | Start | 103,358,727 bp |
| Band | 8 D1|8 50.44 cM | End | 103,512,274 bp |
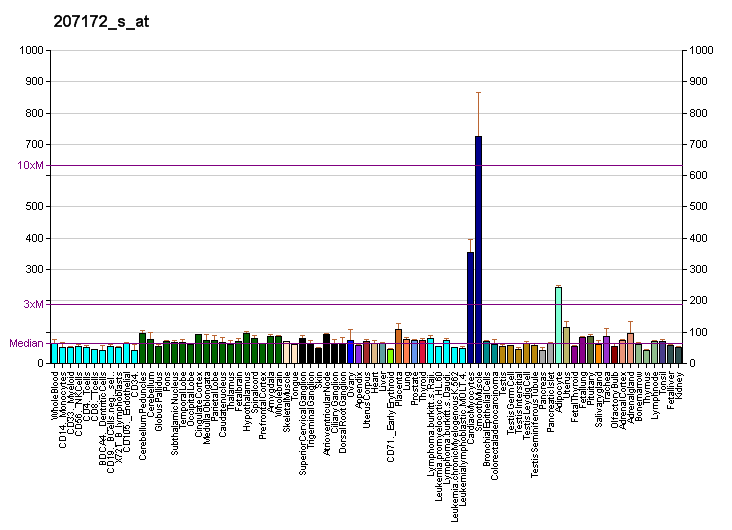

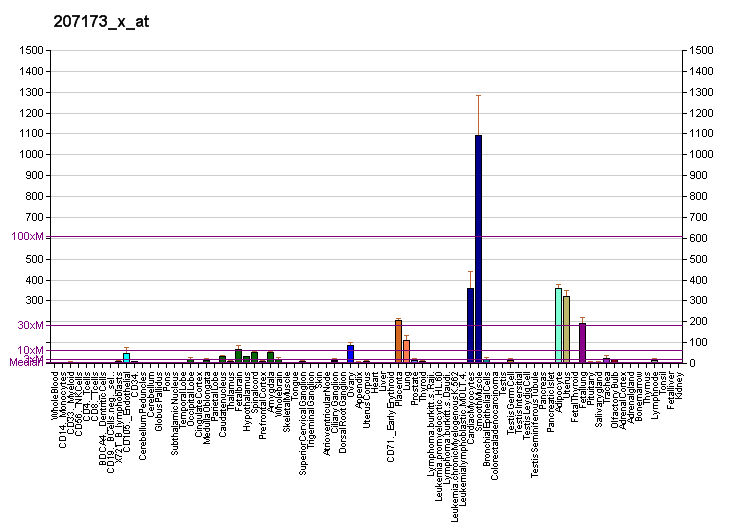
RNA expression pattern
| Bgee | Human / Mouse (ortholog); Top expressed in: periodontal fiber; stromal cell of endometrium; tibia; visceral pleura; Achilles tendon; decidua; left ovary; right ovary; germinal epithelium; smooth muscle tissue / Top expressed in: calvaria; vas deferens; dermis; body of femur; Gonadal ridge; efferent ductule; human fetus; left lung lobe; maxillary prominence; molar; More reference expression data |
| BioGPS | More reference expression data |
Gene ontology
| Molecular function | metal ion binding; calcium ion binding; cytoskeletal protein binding; protein homodimerization activity; cadherin binding |
| Cellular component | plasma membrane; membrane; cytoplasm; integral component of membrane; extracellular exosome; cell surface; catenin complex; synapse; Schaffer collateral - CA1 synapse; glutamatergic synapse |
| Biological process | homophilic cell adhesion via plasma membrane adhesion molecules; skeletal system development; adherens junction organization; ossification; corticospinal tract morphogenesis; cell adhesion; cell morphogenesis; cell-cell junction assembly; calcium-dependent cell-cell adhesion via plasma membrane cell adhesion molecules; cell-cell adhesion mediated by cadherin; modulation of chemical synaptic transmission; cell-cell adhesion |
Sources:Amigo / QuickGO
Orthologs
| Databases | NCBI: entry; OMA: entry |
| Species | Human | Mouse |
| Entrez | 1009 | 12552 |
| Ensembl | ENSG00000140937 | ENSMUSG00000031673 |
| UniProt | P55287 | P55288 |
| RefSeq (mRNA) | NM_001308392; NM_001797; NM_001330576; NM_033664 | NM_009866 |
| RefSeq (protein) | NP_001295321; NP_001317505; NP_001788 | NP_033996 |
| Location (UCSC) | Chr 16: 64.94 – 65.13 Mb | Chr 8: 103.36 – 103.51 Mb |
| PubMed search |
- Wikidata
| View/Edit Human | View/Edit Mouse |

Cadherin-11 is a protein that in humans is encoded by the CDH11 gene.

== Function ==
This gene encodes a type II classical cadherin from the cadherin superfamily, integral membrane proteins that mediate calcium-dependent cell-cell adhesion. Mature cadherin proteins are composed of a large N-terminal extracellular domain, a single membrane-spanning domain, and a small, highly conserved C-terminal cytoplasmic domain. Type II (atypical) cadherins are defined based on their lack of a HAV cell adhesion recognition sequence specific to type I cadherins. Expression of this particular cadherin in osteoblastic cell lines, and its upregulation during differentiation, suggests a specific function in bone development and maintenance. The mammalian CDH-11 homologues are termed calsyntenin.

== Relevance to cancer ==
CDH11 is overexpressed in 15% of breast cancers and seems essential to tumour progression in some other cancer types.

== Drug interactions ==
Arthritis drug celecoxib binds to CDH11.

== Interactions ==
CDH11 has been shown to interact with CDH2.
