= CLSTN1 =

Protein-coding gene in humans

Identifiers
- Aliases: CLSTN1, ALC-ALPHA, CDHR12, CSTN1, PIK3CD, XB31alpha, alcalpha1, alcalpha2, CST-1, calsyntenin 1
- External IDs: OMIM: 611321; MGI: 1929895; GeneCards: CLSTN1

Gene location (Human)
Chr.	Chromosome 1 (human)
Band	1p36.22	Start	9,728,926 bp
Band	1p36.22	End	9,823,984 bp

Gene location (Mouse)
Chr.	Chromosome 4 (mouse)
Band	4|4 E2	Start	149,670,925 bp
Band	4|4 E2	End	149,733,356 bp
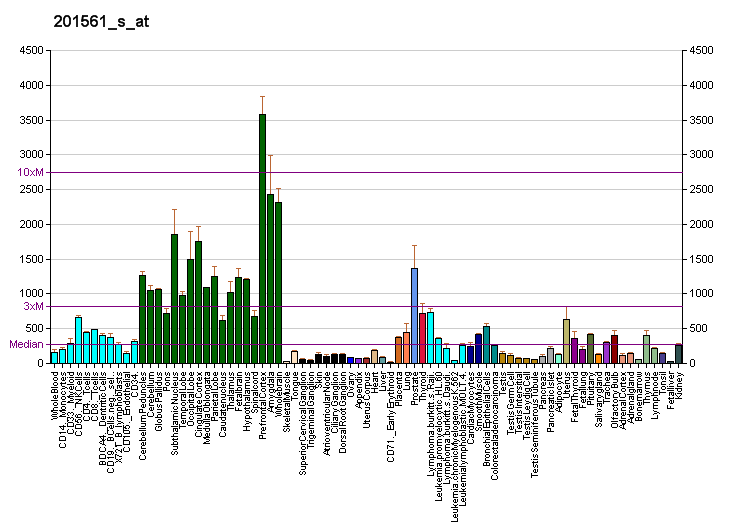
RNA expression pattern
Bgee	Human / Mouse (ortholog); Top expressed in: frontal pole; postcentral gyrus; Brodmann area 10; paraflocculus of cerebellum; middle temporal gyrus; orbitofrontal cortex; superior frontal gyrus; Brodmann area 46; cerebellar vermis; right hemisphere of cerebellum / Top expressed in: primary motor cortex; cingulate gyrus; neural layer of retina; prefrontal cortex; habenula; primary visual cortex; superior frontal gyrus; medial dorsal nucleus; piriform cortex; medial geniculate nucleus; More reference expression data
BioGPS	More reference expression data
Gene ontology
Molecular function	X11-like protein binding; calcium ion binding; amyloid-beta binding; protein binding; kinesin binding
Cellular component	integral component of membrane; postsynaptic membrane; Golgi apparatus; cell projection; endoplasmic reticulum membrane; membrane; Golgi membrane; plasma membrane; synapse; extracellular region; cell surface; cell junction; endoplasmic reticulum; nucleus; postsynaptic density; postsynaptic endosome; glutamatergic synapse; GABA-ergic synapse; integral component of postsynaptic density membrane; integral component of spine apparatus membrane
Biological process	cell adhesion; positive regulation of synaptic transmission; regulation of cell growth; homophilic cell adhesion via plasma membrane adhesion molecules; positive regulation of synapse assembly; regulation of synapse maturation; neurotransmitter receptor transport to postsynaptic membrane; vesicle-mediated transport in synapse
Sources:Amigo / QuickGO
Orthologs
Databases	NCBI: entry; OMA: entry
Species	Human	Mouse
Entrez	22883	65945
Ensembl	ENSG00000171603	ENSMUSG00000039953
UniProt	O94985	Q9EPL2
RefSeq (mRNA)	NM_014944; NM_001009566; NM_001302883	NM_001290989; NM_023051
RefSeq (protein)	NP_001009566; NP_001289812; NP_055759	NP_001277918; NP_075538
Location (UCSC)	Chr 1: 9.73 – 9.82 Mb	Chr 4: 149.67 – 149.73 Mb
PubMed search
- Wikidata
View/Edit Human	View/Edit Mouse

Calsyntenin-1 is a protein that in humans is encoded by the CLSTN1 gene.

== Clinical relevance ==
Mutations in this gene have been shown associated to pathogenic mechanisms of Alzheimer's disease.

== Interactions ==
CLSTN1 has been shown to interact with APBA2 and Amyloid precursor protein.
