= APBA3 =

Protein-coding gene in the species Homo sapiens

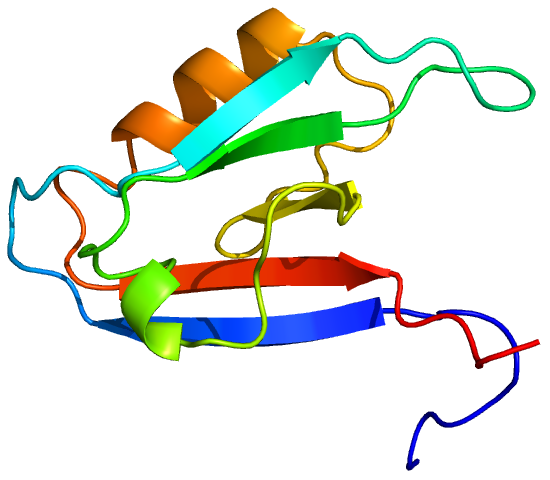

Identifiers
- Aliases: APBA3, MGC:15815, X11L2, mint3, amyloid beta precursor protein binding family A member 3
- External IDs: OMIM: 604262; MGI: 1888527; GeneCards: APBA3
Available structures
PDB	Ortholog search: PDBe RCSB
PDB	List of PDB id codes 2YT7, 2YT8

Gene location (Human)
Chr.	Chromosome 19 (human)
Band	19p13.3	Start	3,750,772 bp
Band	19p13.3	End	3,761,692 bp

Gene location (Mouse)
Chr.	Chromosome 10 (mouse)
Band	10|10 C1	Start	81,102,794 bp
Band	10|10 C1	End	81,109,080 bp
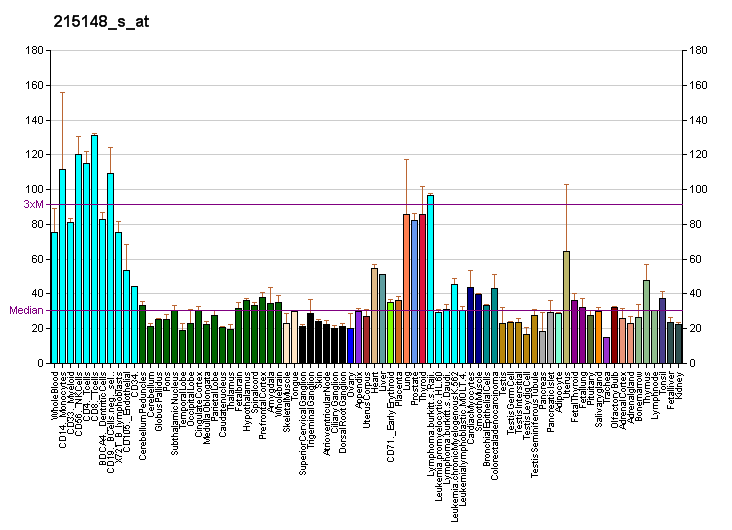

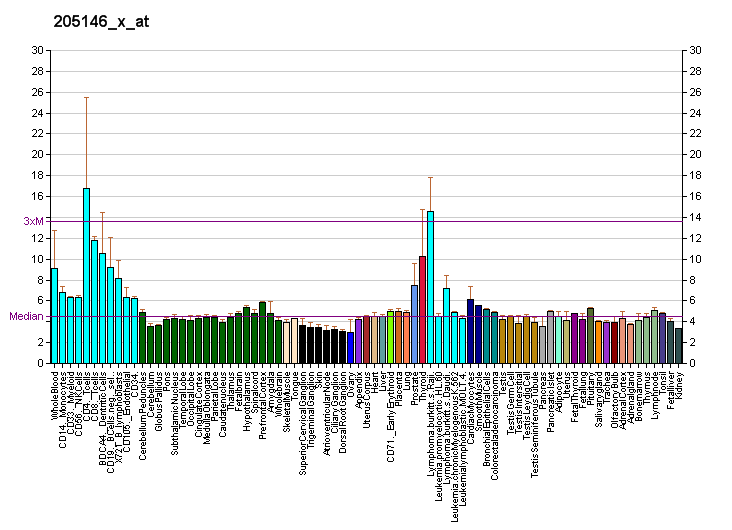
RNA expression pattern
Bgee	Human / Mouse (ortholog); Top expressed in: pancreatic ductal cell; granulocyte; right hemisphere of cerebellum; right ovary; left ovary; blood; spleen; cartilage tissue; lymph node; gastrocnemius muscle / Top expressed in: muscle of thigh; skeletal muscle tissue; adrenal gland; spermatocyte; yolk sac; quadriceps femoris muscle; proximal tubule; right kidney; esophagus; white adipose tissue; More reference expression data
BioGPS	More reference expression data
Gene ontology
Molecular function	enzyme binding; enzyme inhibitor activity; amyloid-beta binding; protein binding
Cellular component	cytoplasm; perinuclear region of cytoplasm; plasma membrane; dendritic spine; synapse
Biological process	protein transport; regulation of catalytic activity; negative regulation of catalytic activity; in utero embryonic development; chemical synaptic transmission; regulation of gene expression
Sources:Amigo / QuickGO
Orthologs
Databases	NCBI: entry; OMA: entry
Species	Human	Mouse
Entrez	9546	57267
Ensembl	ENSG00000011132	ENSMUSG00000004931
UniProt	O96018	O88888
RefSeq (mRNA)	NM_004886	NM_018758
RefSeq (protein)	NP_004877	NP_061228
Location (UCSC)	Chr 19: 3.75 – 3.76 Mb	Chr 10: 81.1 – 81.11 Mb
PubMed search
- Wikidata
View/Edit Human	View/Edit Mouse

Amyloid beta A4 precursor protein-binding family A member 3 is a protein that in humans is encoded by the APBA3 gene.

== Function ==
The protein encoded by this gene is a member of the X11 protein family. It is an adapter protein that interacts with the Alzheimer's disease amyloid precursor protein. This gene product is believed to be involved in signal transduction processes. This gene is a candidate gene for Alzheimer's disease.

== Interactions ==
APBA3 has been shown to interact with Amyloid precursor protein.
