= APPBP2 =

Protein-coding gene in the species Homo sapiens

Identifiers
- Aliases: APPBP2, APP-BP2, HS.84084, PAT1, amyloid beta precursor protein binding protein 2
- External IDs: OMIM: 605324; MGI: 1914134; HomoloGene: 31378; GeneCards: APPBP2; OMA:APPBP2 - orthologs

Gene location (Human)
Chr.	Chromosome 17 (human)
Band	17q23.2	Start	60,443,158 bp
Band	17q23.2	End	60,526,242 bp

Gene location (Mouse)
Chr.	Chromosome 11 (mouse)
Band	11|11 C	Start	85,078,088 bp
Band	11|11 C	End	85,125,956 bp
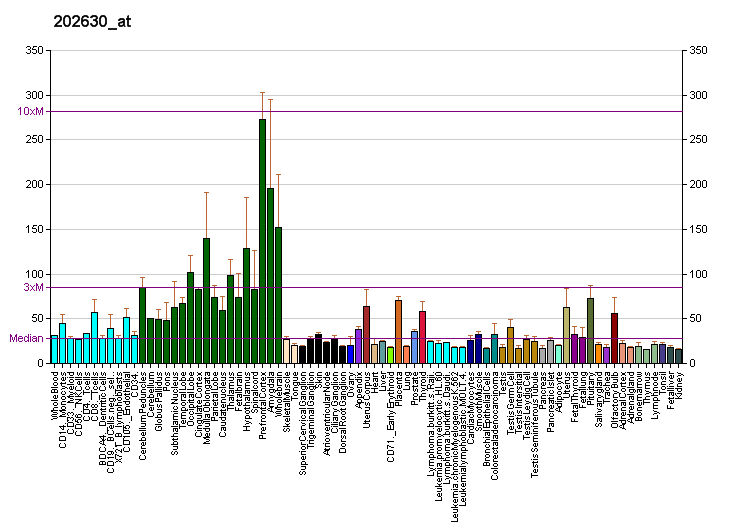

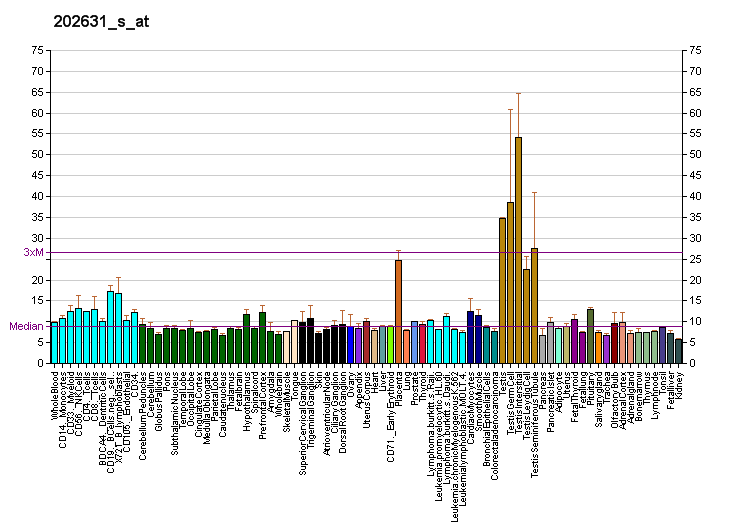
RNA expression pattern
Bgee	Human / Mouse (ortholog); Top expressed in: endothelial cell; Brodmann area 23; lateral nuclear group of thalamus; cerebellar vermis; pars compacta; pars reticulata; buccal mucosa cell; dorsal motor nucleus of vagus nerve; external globus pallidus; internal globus pallidus / Top expressed in: Rostral migratory stream; vas deferens; Gonadal ridge; abdominal wall; umbilical cord; efferent ductule; epithelium of lens; migratory enteric neural crest cell; ventromedial nucleus; ventral tegmental area; More reference expression data
BioGPS	More reference expression data
Gene ontology
Molecular function	microtubule motor activity; protein binding
Cellular component	microtubule; cytoskeleton; cytoplasmic vesicle membrane; membrane; nucleus; microtubule associated complex; cytoplasm
Biological process	protein transport; intracellular transport; intracellular protein transport
Sources:Amigo / QuickGO
Orthologs
Species	Human	Mouse
Entrez	10513	66884
Ensembl	ENSG00000062725	ENSMUSG00000018481
UniProt	Q92624	Q9DAX9
RefSeq (mRNA)	NM_001282476; NM_006380	NM_025825
RefSeq (protein)	NP_001269405; NP_006371	NP_080101
Location (UCSC)	Chr 17: 60.44 – 60.53 Mb	Chr 11: 85.08 – 85.13 Mb
PubMed search
- Wikidata
View/Edit Human	View/Edit Mouse

Amyloid protein-binding protein 2 is a protein that in humans is encoded by the APPBP2 gene.

The protein encoded by this gene interacts with microtubules and is functionally associated with beta-amyloid precursor protein transport and/or processing. The beta-amyloid precursor protein is a cell surface protein with signal-transducing properties, and it is thought to play a role in the pathogenesis of Alzheimer's disease. This gene has been found to be highly expressed in breast cancer. Multiple polyadenylation sites have been found for this gene.

== Interactions ==
APPBP2 has been shown to interact with Amyloid precursor protein.{
