= APBB1 =

Protein-coding gene in the species Homo sapiens

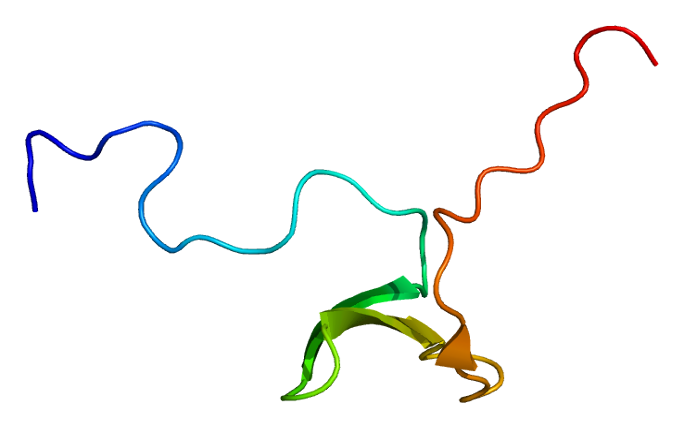

Identifiers
- Aliases: APBB1, amyloid beta (A4) precursor protein-binding, family B, member 1 (Fe65), FE65, MGC:9072, RIR, amyloid beta precursor protein binding family B member 1
- External IDs: OMIM: 602709; MGI: 107765; GeneCards: APBB1
Available structures
PDB	Ortholog search: PDBe RCSB
PDB	List of PDB id codes 2E45, 2HO2, 2IDH, 3D8D, 3D8E, 3D8F, 3DXC, 3DXD, 3DXE

Gene location (Human)
Chr.	Chromosome 11 (human)
Band	11p15.4	Start	6,395,125 bp
Band	11p15.4	End	6,419,414 bp

Gene location (Mouse)
Chr.	Chromosome 7 (mouse)
Band	7 E3|7 55.9 cM	Start	105,207,690 bp
Band	7 E3|7 55.9 cM	End	105,230,860 bp
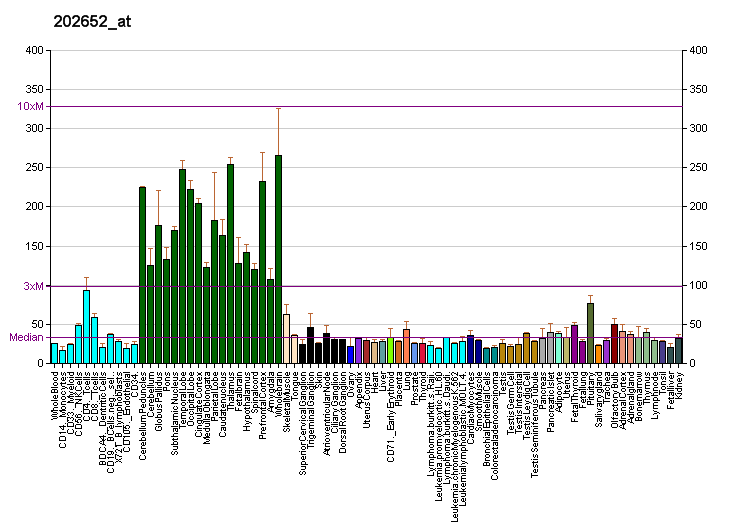
RNA expression pattern
Bgee	Human / Mouse (ortholog); Top expressed in: right hemisphere of cerebellum; right frontal lobe; C1 segment; ganglionic eminence; prefrontal cortex; anterior pituitary; cingulate gyrus; Brodmann area 9; anterior cingulate cortex; amygdala / Top expressed in: entorhinal cortex; perirhinal cortex; primary visual cortex; CA3 field; superior frontal gyrus; dentate gyrus of hippocampal formation granule cell; habenula; primary motor cortex; cerebellar cortex; prefrontal cortex; More reference expression data
BioGPS	More reference expression data
Gene ontology
Molecular function	protein-containing complex binding; histone binding; chromatin binding; protein binding; tau protein binding; proline-rich region binding; transcription factor binding; amyloid-beta binding; ubiquitin protein ligase binding
Cellular component	postsynaptic membrane; nuclear speck; cell projection; membrane; dendritic spine; synapse; main axon; nucleoplasm; growth cone lamellipodium; soma; perinuclear region of cytoplasm; growth cone filopodium; presynaptic membrane; lamellipodium; plasma membrane; cytoplasm; growth cone; nucleus; protein-containing complex; presynapse
Biological process	regulation of transcription, DNA-templated; axonogenesis; positive regulation of DNA repair; transcription, DNA-templated; response to iron ion; negative regulation of cell growth; positive regulation of protein secretion; positive regulation of neuron projection development; positive regulation of apoptotic process; signal transduction; positive regulation of transcription by RNA polymerase II; apoptotic process; histone H4 acetylation; positive regulation of transcription, DNA-templated; cellular response to DNA damage stimulus; double-strand break repair; negative regulation of transcription by RNA polymerase II; chromatin organization
Sources:Amigo / QuickGO
Orthologs
Databases	NCBI: entry; OMA: entry
Species	Human	Mouse
Entrez	322	11785
Ensembl	ENSG00000166313	ENSMUSG00000037032
UniProt	O00213	Q9QXJ1
RefSeq (mRNA)	NM_001164; NM_001257319; NM_001257320; NM_001257321; NM_001257322 NM_001257323; NM_001257324; NM_001257325; NM_001257326; NM_145689	NM_001253885; NM_001253886; NM_001253887; NM_009685; NM_001310600
RefSeq (protein)	NP_001155; NP_001244248; NP_001244249; NP_001244250; NP_001244252 NP_001244254; NP_001244255; NP_663722	NP_001240814; NP_001240815; NP_001240816; NP_001297529; NP_033815
Location (UCSC)	Chr 11: 6.4 – 6.42 Mb	Chr 7: 105.21 – 105.23 Mb
PubMed search
- Wikidata
View/Edit Human	View/Edit Mouse

Amyloid beta A4 precursor protein-binding family B member 1 is a protein that in humans is encoded by the APBB1 gene.

== Function ==
The protein encoded by this gene is a member of the Fe65 protein family. It is an adaptor protein localized in the nucleus. It interacts with the Alzheimer's disease amyloid precursor protein (APP), transcription factor CP2/LSF/LBP1 and the low-density lipoprotein receptor-related protein. APP functions as a cytosolic anchoring site that can prevent the gene product's nuclear translocation. This encoded protein could play an important role in the pathogenesis of Alzheimer's disease. It is thought to regulate transcription. Also it is observed to block cell cycle progression by downregulating thymidylate synthase expression. Multiple alternatively spliced transcript variants have been described for this gene but some of their full length sequence is not known.

== Interactions ==
APBB1 has been shown to interact with APLP2, TFCP2, LRP1 and Amyloid precursor protein.
