= MTDH =

Protein-coding gene in the species Homo sapiens

Available structures
PDB	Ortholog search: PDBe RCSB
PDB	List of PDB id codes 4QMG

Identifiers
- Aliases: MTDH, 3D3, AEG-1, AEG1, LYRIC, LYRIC/3D3, metadherin
- External IDs: OMIM: 610323; MGI: 1914404; HomoloGene: 12089; GeneCards: MTDH; OMA:MTDH - orthologs

Gene location (Human)
Chr.	Chromosome 8 (human)
Band	8q22.1	Start	97,644,184 bp
Band	8q22.1	End	97,730,260 bp

Gene location (Mouse)
Chr.	Chromosome 15 (mouse)
Band	15 B3.1|15 13.98 cM	Start	34,082,840 bp
Band	15 B3.1|15 13.98 cM	End	34,145,770 bp
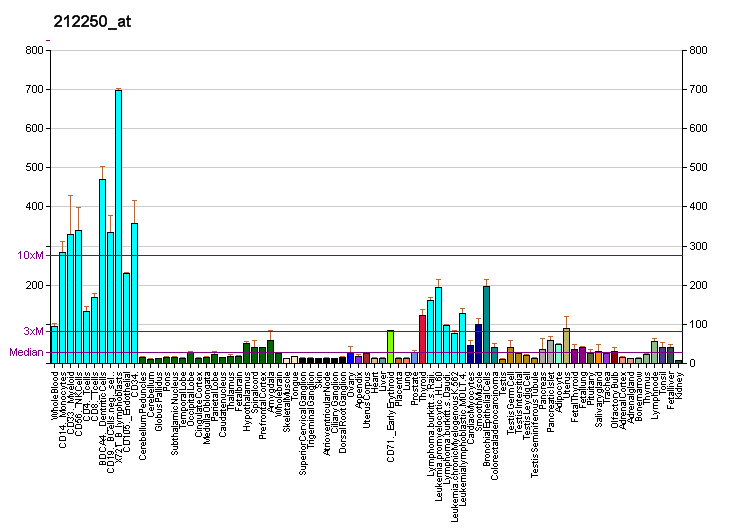

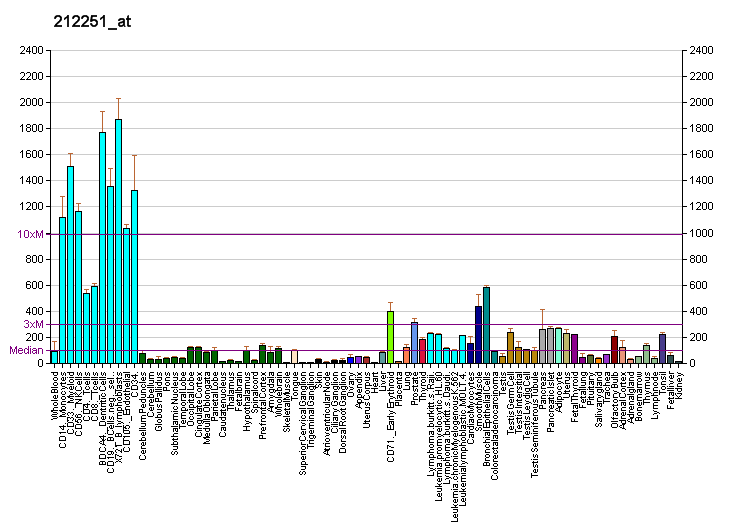
RNA expression pattern
Bgee	Human / Mouse (ortholog); Top expressed in: Achilles tendon; secondary oocyte; pylorus; sural nerve; nipple; corpus callosum; cardia; bone marrow cell; inferior ganglion of vagus nerve; decidua / Top expressed in: otic placode; saccule; genital tubercle; spermatid; tail of embryo; muscle of thigh; triceps brachii muscle; ankle; neural layer of retina; epithelium of stomach; More reference expression data
BioGPS	More reference expression data
Gene ontology
Molecular function	transcription coactivator activity; NF-kappaB binding; protein binding; double-stranded RNA binding; RNA binding
Cellular component	cytoplasm; integral component of membrane; nuclear body; nuclear membrane; endoplasmic reticulum membrane; membrane; bicellular tight junction; intercellular canaliculus; cell junction; apical plasma membrane; endoplasmic reticulum; perinuclear region of cytoplasm; nucleus; fibrillar center; nucleolus
Biological process	positive regulation of protein kinase B signaling; positive regulation of autophagy; negative regulation of apoptotic process; negative regulation of transcription by RNA polymerase II; positive regulation of angiogenesis; positive regulation of NF-kappaB transcription factor activity; bicellular tight junction assembly; positive regulation of I-kappaB kinase/NF-kappaB signaling; lipopolysaccharide-mediated signaling pathway; positive regulation of nucleic acid-templated transcription
Sources:Amigo / QuickGO
Orthologs
Species	Human	Mouse
Entrez	92140	67154
Ensembl	ENSG00000147649	ENSMUSG00000022255
UniProt	Q86UE4	Q80WJ7
RefSeq (mRNA)	NM_178812; NM_001363136; NM_001363137; NM_001363138; NM_001363139	NM_026002; NM_001357925; NM_001357926
RefSeq (protein)	NP_848927; NP_001350065; NP_001350066; NP_001350067; NP_001350068	NP_080278; NP_001344854; NP_001344855
Location (UCSC)	Chr 8: 97.64 – 97.73 Mb	Chr 15: 34.08 – 34.15 Mb
PubMed search
- Wikidata
View/Edit Human	View/Edit Mouse

Metadherin, also known as protein LYRIC or astrocyte elevated gene-1 protein (AEG-1) is a protein that in humans is encoded by the MTDH gene.

== Function ==
MTDH (AEG-1) is involved in HIF-1alpha mediated angiogenesis. MTDH also interacts with SND1 and involved in RNA-induced silencing complex (RISC) and plays very important role in RISC and miRNA functions. MTDH has been shown to interact with spliceosome proteins in the cell nucleus and regulate the process of alternative splicing.

MTDH induces an oncogene called Late SV40 factor (LSF/TFCP2) which is involved in thymidylate synthase (TS) induction and DNA biosynthesis synthesis. Late SV40 factor (LSF/TFCP2) enhances angiogenesis by transcriptionally up-regulating matrix metalloproteinase-9 (MMP9).

== Clinical significance ==
MTDH acts as an oncogene in melanoma, malignant glioma, breast cancer and hepatocellular carcinoma. It is highly expressed in these cancers and helps in their progression and development. It is induced by c-Myc oncogene and plays an important role in anchorage independent growth of cancer cells (metastasis).

Elevated expression of MTDH, which is overexpressed in more than 40% of breast cancers, is associated with poor clinical outcomes. MTDH has a dual role in promoting metastatic seeding and enhancing chemoresistance. MTDH is therefore a potential therapeutic target for enhancing chemotherapy and reducing metastasis.

MTDH has been shown to be overexpressed in prostate cancer, where there is a shift towards a more cytoplasmic localisation, signalling a poor prognosis. In the nucleus of prostate cancer cells, MTDH has been shown to affect alternative splicing of genes such as CD44, which may also be associated with prostate cancer progression.

LSF/TFCP2 plays a multifaceted role in chemo resistance, EMT, allergic response, inflammation and Alzheimer's disease.

MTDH controls many hallmarks of oncogenes and cancer. MTDH/AEG-1 induces hepato steatosis in mouse liver. MTDH knockdown by artificial microRNA interference functions as a potential tumor suppressor in breast cancer. Astrocyte elevated gene-1/MTDH undergoes palmitoylation in normal and abnormal cell physiology. Biomaterial titanium substrata with microgrooves can alter MTDH expression in human primary cells.

== Interactions ==
MTDH has been shown to interact with:

- Nucleolin,
- NF-kB-p65 subunit,
