= APBA2 =

Protein-coding gene in the species Homo sapiens

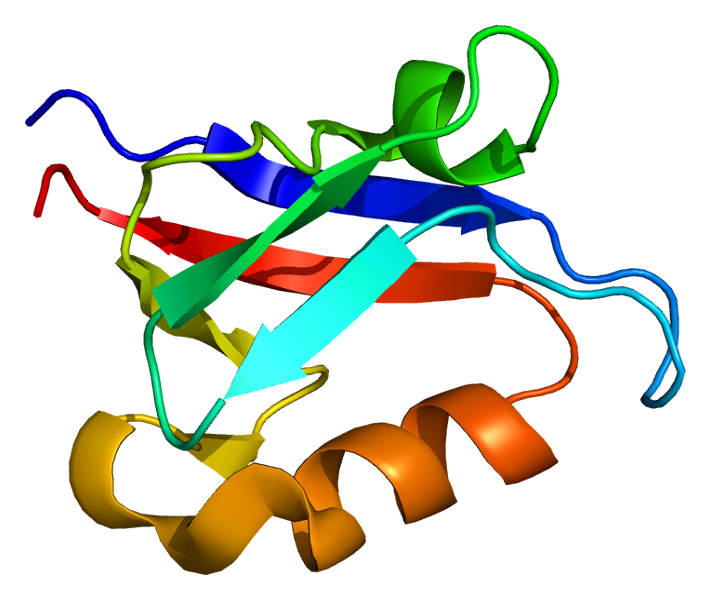

Identifiers
- Aliases: APBA2, D15S1518E, HsT16821, LIN-10, MGC:14091, MINT2, X11-BETA, X11L, amyloid beta precursor protein binding family A member 2
- External IDs: OMIM: 602712; MGI: 1261791; GeneCards: APBA2

Gene location (Human)
Chr.	Chromosome 15 (human)
Band	15q13.1	Start	28,884,483 bp
Band	15q13.1	End	29,118,315 bp

Gene location (Mouse)
Chr.	Chromosome 7 (mouse)
Band	7 C|7 34.65 cM	Start	64,501,706 bp
Band	7 C|7 34.65 cM	End	64,753,878 bp
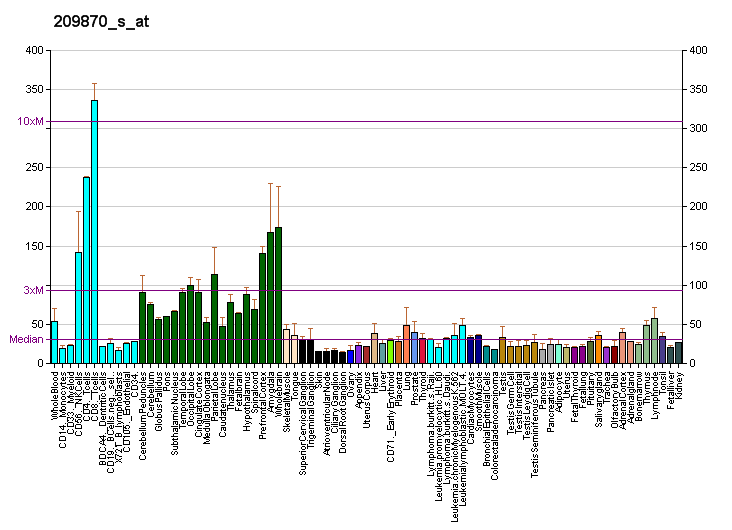

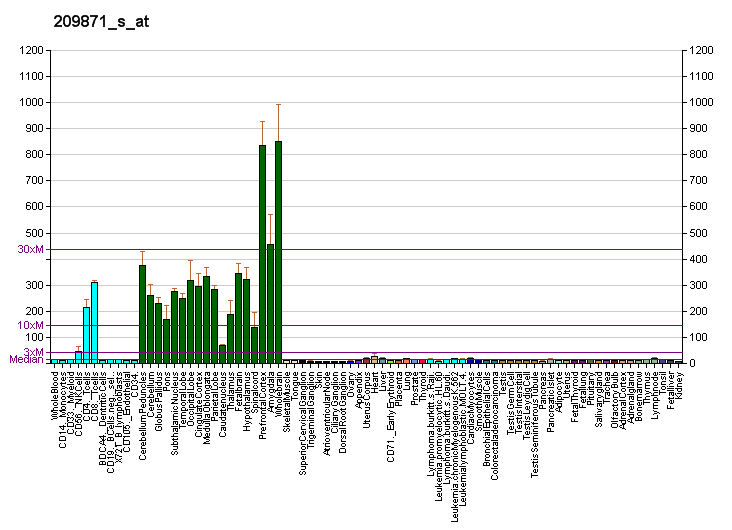
RNA expression pattern
Bgee	Human / Mouse (ortholog); Top expressed in: superior frontal gyrus; right hemisphere of cerebellum; primary visual cortex; prefrontal cortex; right frontal lobe; Brodmann area 9; anterior cingulate cortex; hippocampus proper; ganglionic eminence; C1 segment / Top expressed in: dentate gyrus of hippocampal formation granule cell; primary visual cortex; superior frontal gyrus; perirhinal cortex; CA3 field; entorhinal cortex; cerebellar cortex; hippocampus proper; primary motor cortex; cingulate gyrus; More reference expression data
BioGPS	More reference expression data
Gene ontology
Molecular function	amyloid-beta binding; protein binding; identical protein binding
Cellular component	plasma membrane; synaptic vesicle; Schaffer collateral - CA1 synapse; cytoplasm; dendritic spine; synapse
Biological process	regulation of gene expression; protein transport; in utero embryonic development; locomotory behavior; nervous system development; multicellular organism growth; chemical synaptic transmission; regulation of synaptic vesicle exocytosis
Sources:Amigo / QuickGO
Orthologs
Databases	NCBI: entry; OMA: entry
Species	Human	Mouse
Entrez	321	11784
Ensembl	ENSG00000034053; ENSG00000276495	ENSMUSG00000030519
UniProt	Q99767	P98084
RefSeq (mRNA)	NM_001130414; NM_005503; NM_001353788; NM_001353789; NM_001353790 NM_001353791; NM_001353792; NM_001353793; NM_001353794; NM_001353795; NM_001353796; NM_001353797; NM_001379685	NM_001291166; NM_001291167; NM_007461
RefSeq (protein)	NP_001123886; NP_005494; NP_001340717; NP_001340718; NP_001340719 NP_001340720; NP_001340721; NP_001340722; NP_001340723; NP_001340724; NP_001340725; NP_001340726; NP_001366614	NP_001278095; NP_001278096; NP_031487
Location (UCSC)	Chr 15: 28.88 – 29.12 Mb	Chr 7: 64.5 – 64.75 Mb
PubMed search
- Wikidata
View/Edit Human	View/Edit Mouse

Amyloid beta A4 precursor protein-binding family A member 2 is a protein that in humans is encoded by the APBA2 gene.

== Structure ==
This protein has phosphotyrosine-binding domain (PTB domain or PID) in the middle and two PDZ domains at C-terminal.

== Function ==
The protein encoded by this gene is a member of the X11 protein family. It is a neuronal adaptor protein that interacts with the Alzheimer's disease amyloid precursor protein (APP). It stabilises APP and inhibits production of proteolytic APP fragments including the A beta peptide that is deposited in the brains of Alzheimer's disease patients. This gene product is believed to be involved in signal transduction processes. It is also regarded as a putative vesicular trafficking protein in the brain that can form a complex with the potential to couple synaptic vesicle exocytosis to neuronal cell adhesion.

== Interactions ==
APBA2 has been shown to interact with CLSTN1, RELA and amyloid precursor protein.
