= Growth factor-like domain =

Amyloid precursor N-terminal
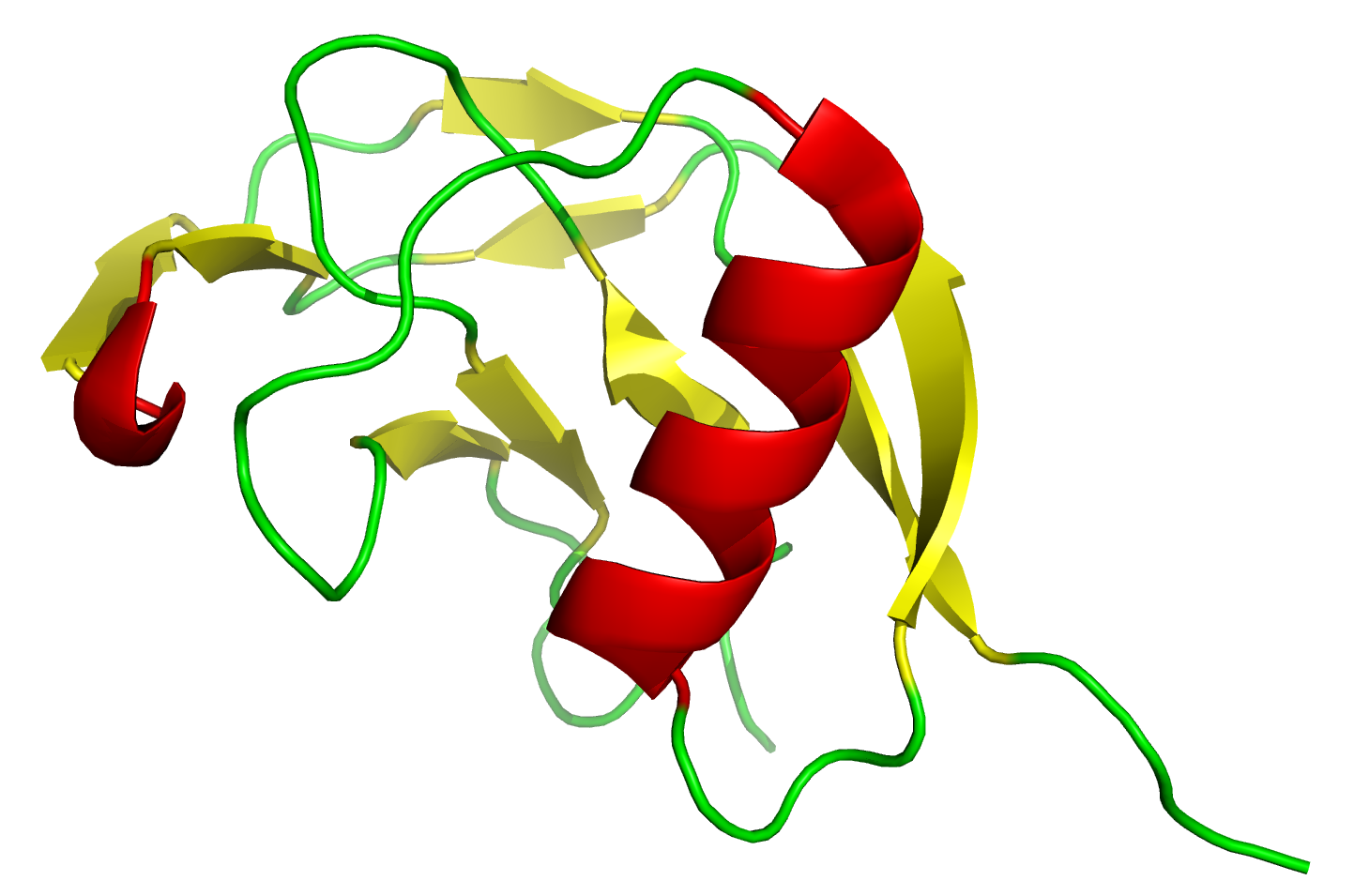
- The GFLD region of amyloid precursor protein

Identifiers
- Symbol: APP_CU_bd
- Pfam: PF02177
- InterPro: IPR008154
- SMART: SM00006
- SCOP2: 1mwp / SCOPe / SUPFAM
Available protein structures:
- Pfam: structures / ECOD
- PDB: RCSB PDB; PDBe; PDBj
- PDBsum: structure summary
- PDB: 1mwp, 1owt, 2fjz, 2fk1, 2fk2, 2fk3, 2fkl, 2fma

A growth factor-like domain (GFLD) is a protein domain structurally related to epidermal growth factor, which has a high binding affinity for the epidermal growth factor receptor. As structural domains within larger proteins, GFLD regions commonly bind calcium ions. A subtype present in the N-terminal region of the amyloid precursor protein is a member of the heparin-binding class of GFLDs and may itself have growth factor function, particularly in promoting neuronal development.
