= TFCP2 =

Protein-coding gene in the species Homo sapiens

Identifiers
- Aliases: TFCP2, LBP1C, LSF, LSF1D, SEF, TFCP2C, transcription factor CP2
- External IDs: OMIM: 189889; MGI: 98509; GeneCards: TFCP2

Gene location (Human)
| Chr. | Chromosome 12 (human) |
| Band | 12q13.12-q13.13 | Start | 51,093,656 bp |
| Band | 12q13.12-q13.13 | End | 51,173,135 bp |

Gene location (Mouse)
| Chr. | Chromosome 15 (mouse) |
| Band | 15 F1|15 56.33 cM | Start | 100,395,893 bp |
| Band | 15 F1|15 56.33 cM | End | 100,449,889 bp |
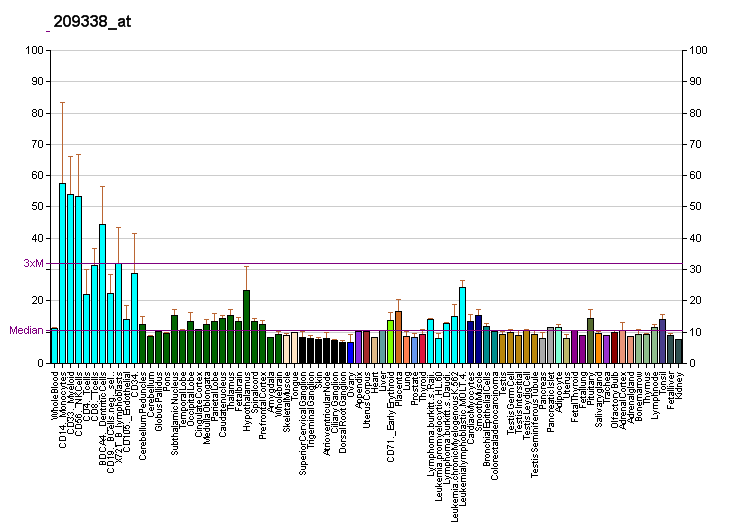

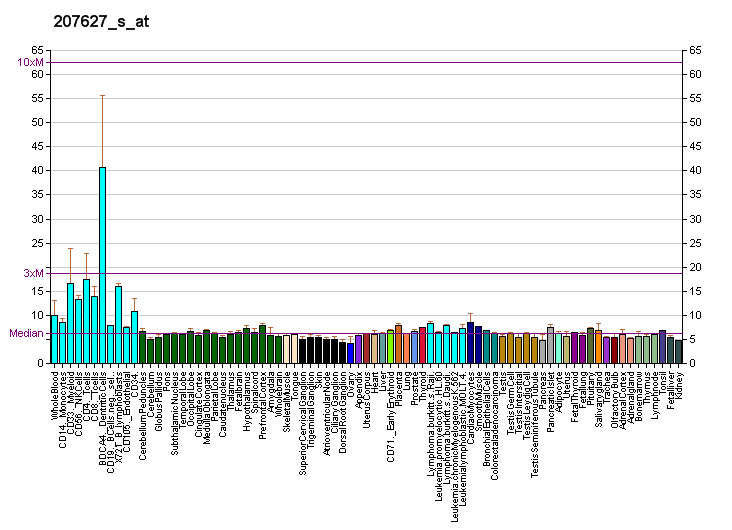
RNA expression pattern
| Bgee | Human / Mouse (ortholog); Top expressed in: mucosa of paranasal sinus; superficial temporal artery; ventricular zone; monocyte; ganglionic eminence; granulocyte; rectum; gastrocnemius muscle; gonad; islet of Langerhans / Top expressed in: neural layer of retina; pineal gland; genital tubercle; tail of embryo; ventricular zone; perirhinal cortex; renal corpuscle; entorhinal cortex; right kidney; neural tube; More reference expression data |
| BioGPS | More reference expression data |
Gene ontology
| Molecular function | DNA-binding transcription factor activity; DNA binding; protein C-terminus binding; protein binding; sequence-specific DNA binding; DNA-binding transcription activator activity, RNA polymerase II-specific; cis-regulatory region sequence-specific DNA binding; transcription factor binding; DNA-binding transcription factor activity, RNA polymerase II-specific; RNA polymerase II cis-regulatory region sequence-specific DNA binding |
| Cellular component | nucleoplasm; cytosol; nucleus; protein-containing complex |
| Biological process | regulation of transcription, DNA-templated; transcription, DNA-templated; positive regulation of transcription by RNA polymerase II; mRNA transcription by RNA polymerase II; regulation of transcription by RNA polymerase II |
Sources:Amigo / QuickGO
Orthologs
| Databases | NCBI: entry; OMA: entry |
| Species | Human | Mouse |
| Entrez | 7024 | 21422 |
| Ensembl | ENSG00000135457 | ENSMUSG00000009733 |
| UniProt | Q12800 | Q9ERA0 |
| RefSeq (mRNA) | NM_005653; NM_001173452; NM_001173453 | NM_001289603; NM_033476; NM_001355497 |
| RefSeq (protein) | NP_001166923; NP_001166924; NP_005644 | NP_001276532; NP_258437; NP_001342426 |
| Location (UCSC) | Chr 12: 51.09 – 51.17 Mb | Chr 15: 100.4 – 100.45 Mb |
| PubMed search |
- Wikidata
| View/Edit Human | View/Edit Mouse |

Alpha-globin transcription factor CP2 is a protein that in humans is encoded by the TFCP2 gene.

TFCP2 is also called Late SV40 factor (LSF) and it is induced by well-known oncogene AEG-1. LSF also acts as an oncogene in hepatocellular carcinoma. LSF enhances angiogenesis by transcriptionally up-regulating matrix metalloproteinase-9 (MMP9).

Along with its main oncogene function in hepatocellular carcinoma (HCC), it plays multifaceted role in chemoresistance, epithelial-mesenchymal transition (EMT), allergic response, inflammation and Alzheimer's disease. The small molecule FQI1 (factor quinolinone inhibitor 1) prevents LSF from binding with HCC DNA, which results in HCC cell death.

== Interactions ==
TFCP2 has been shown to interact with APBB1 and RNF2.
