= Amyloid-beta precursor protein =

Mammalian protein found in humans

APP
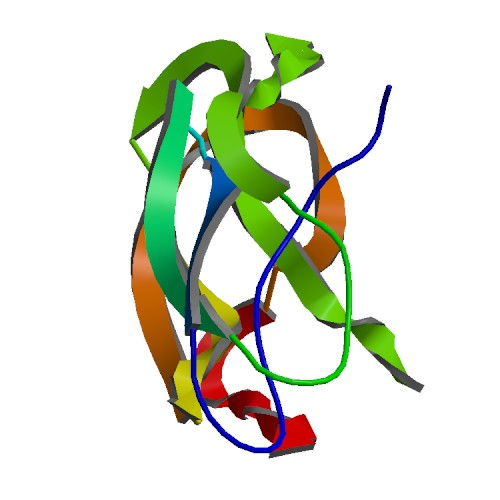

Identifiers
- Aliases: APP, AAA, ABETA, ABPP, AD1, APPI, CTFgamma, CVAP, PN-II, PN2, amyloid beta precursor protein, preA4, alpha-sAPP
- External IDs: OMIM: 104760; MGI: 88059; GeneCards: APP
Available structures
PDB	Ortholog search: PDBe RCSB
PDB	List of PDB id codes 1AAP, 1AMB, 1AMC, 1AML, 1BA4, 1BA6, 1BJB, 1BJC, 1BRC, 1CA0, 1HZ3, 1IYT, 1MWP, 1OWT, 1QCM, 1QWP, 1QXC, 1QYT, 1TAW, 1TKN, 1X11, 1Z0Q, 1ZJD, 2BEG, 2BP4, 2FJZ, 2FK1, 2FK2, 2FK3, 2FKL, 2FMA, 2G47, 2IPU, 2LFM, 2LLM, 2LMN, 2LMO, 2LMP, 2LMQ, 2LOH, 2LP1, 2OTK, 2R0W, 2WK3, 2Y29, 2Y2A, 2Y3J, 2Y3K, 2Y3L, 3AYU, 3DXC, 3DXD, 3DXE, 3GCI, 3IFL, 3IFN, 3IFO, 3IFP, 3JTI, 3KTM, 3L33, 3L81, 3MOQ, 3NYL, 3SV1, 3U0T, 3UMH, 3UMI, 3UMK, 4HIX, 1ZE7, 1ZE9, 2LNQ, 2LZ3, 2LZ4, 2M4J, 2M9R, 2M9S, 2MGT, 2MJ1, 2MPZ, 2MVX, 2MXU, 3BAE, 3BKJ, 3JQ5, 3JQL, 3MXC, 3NYJ, 3OVJ, 3OW9, 4JFN, 4M1C, 4MDR, 4NGE, 4OJF, 4ONF, 4ONG, 4PQD, 4PWQ, 4MVI, 4MVK, 4MVL, 4XXD, 5CSZ, 5AMB, 5AEF, 5AM8, 5BUO, 5HOY, 5HOW, 5HOX, 5KK3, 5C67, 2NAO

Gene location (Human)
Chr.	Chromosome 21 (human)
Band	21q21.3	Start	25,880,550 bp
Band	21q21.3	End	26,171,128 bp

Gene location (Mouse)
Chr.	Chromosome 16 (mouse)
Band	16 C3.3|16 46.92 cM	Start	84,746,573 bp
Band	16 C3.3|16 46.92 cM	End	84,970,654 bp
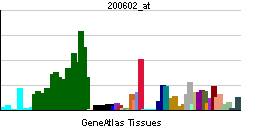

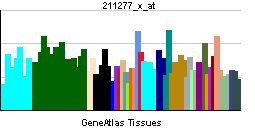

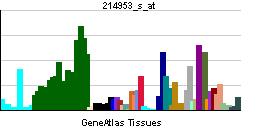
RNA expression pattern
Bgee	Human / Mouse (ortholog); Top expressed in: prefrontal cortex; Brodmann area 9; renal medulla; internal globus pallidus; stromal cell of endometrium; tendon of biceps brachii; primary visual cortex; C1 segment; islet of Langerhans; Epithelium of choroid plexus / Top expressed in: ciliary body; CA3 field; choroid plexus of fourth ventricle; entorhinal cortex; perirhinal cortex; iris; vestibular sensory epithelium; cingulate gyrus; vestibular membrane of cochlear duct; nucleus of stria terminalis; More reference expression data
BioGPS	More reference expression data
Gene ontology
Molecular function	heparin binding; signaling receptor binding; acetylcholine receptor binding; metal ion binding; enzyme binding; peptidase activator activity; peptidase inhibitor activity; protein binding; DNA binding; growth factor receptor binding; PTB domain binding; serine-type endopeptidase inhibitor activity; identical protein binding; transition metal ion binding; signaling receptor activator activity
Cellular component	cytoplasm; endosome; cytosol; trans-Golgi network membrane; membrane; cell-cell junction; synapse; extracellular region; ciliary rootlet; spindle midzone; neuron projection; rough endoplasmic reticulum; dendritic spine; endosome lumen; dendritic shaft; cell surface; terminal bouton; membrane raft; extracellular exosome; integral component of membrane; Golgi apparatus; growth cone; neuromuscular junction; receptor complex; plasma membrane; apical part of cell; astrocyte projection; growth cone lamellipodium; axon; nuclear envelope lumen; clathrin-coated pit; platelet alpha granule lumen; integral component of plasma membrane; main axon; smooth endoplasmic reticulum; COPII-coated ER to Golgi transport vesicle; growth cone filopodium; cytoplasmic vesicle; extracellular space; Golgi lumen; perinuclear region of cytoplasm; early endosome; endoplasmic reticulum lumen; Golgi-associated vesicle; cell projection; perikaryon; presynaptic active zone; recycling endosome; nucleus; synaptic vesicle
Biological process	cellular response to nerve growth factor stimulus; amyloid fibril formation; negative regulation of neuron differentiation; neuromuscular process controlling balance; protein phosphorylation; regulation of epidermal growth factor-activated receptor activity; cellular copper ion homeostasis; neuron projection development; cellular response to cAMP; suckling behavior; apoptotic process; locomotory behavior; adult locomotory behavior; positive regulation of mitotic cell cycle; axo-dendritic transport; response to oxidative stress; mRNA polyadenylation; collateral sprouting in absence of injury; ionotropic glutamate receptor signaling pathway; Notch signaling pathway; negative regulation of peptidase activity; smooth endoplasmic reticulum calcium ion homeostasis; synaptic assembly at neuromuscular junction; neuron remodeling; dendrite development; extracellular matrix organization; cholesterol metabolic process; mating behavior; cellular response to norepinephrine stimulus; nervous system development; cell adhesion; response to lead ion; regulation of gene expression; positive regulation of G2/M transition of mitotic cell cycle; axon midline choice point recognition; visual learning; endocytosis; axonogenesis; regulation of multicellular organism growth; platelet degranulation; positive regulation of peptidase activity; forebrain development; regulation of protein binding; regulation of translation; regulation of synapse structure or activity; cellular process or phenomenon; positive regulation of transcription by RNA polymerase II; negative regulation of endopeptidase activity; response to yeast; antibacterial humoral response; antifungal humoral response; innate immune response; defense response to Gram-negative bacterium; defense response to Gram-positive bacterium; neuron apoptotic process; positive regulation of protein phosphorylation; astrocyte activation involved in immune response; G protein-coupled receptor signaling pathway; learning or memory; learning; negative regulation of cell population proliferation; response to radiation; positive regulation of gene expression; negative regulation of gene expression; positive regulation of peptidyl-threonine phosphorylation; microglia development; regulation of Wnt signaling pathway; positive regulation of protein binding; tumor necrosis factor production; positive regulation of peptidyl-serine phosphorylation; positive regulation of phosphorylation; post-translational protein modification; positive regulation of JNK cascade; astrocyte activation; regulation of long-term neuronal synaptic plasticity; regulation of peptidyl-tyrosine phosphorylation; synapse organization; cognition; positive regulation of DNA-binding transcription factor activity; positive regulation of NF-kappaB transcription factor activity; positive regulation of astrocyte activation; positive regulation of ERK1 and ERK2 cascade; cellular response to copper ion; cellular response to manganese ion; modulation of excitatory postsynaptic potential; regulation of spontaneous synaptic transmission; negative regulation of long-term synaptic potentiation; positive regulation of long-term synaptic potentiation; positive regulation of NIK/NF-kappaB signaling; positive regulation of amyloid-beta formation; positive regulation of microglial cell activation; cellular response to amyloid-beta; negative regulation of low-density lipoprotein receptor activity; regulation of presynapse assembly; positive regulation of amyloid fibril formation; neuron projection maintenance; positive regulation of signaling receptor activity; regulation of NMDA receptor activity; positive regulation of T cell migration; response to interleukin-1; positive regulation of glycolytic process
Sources:Amigo / QuickGO
Orthologs
Databases	NCBI: entry; OMA: entry
Species	Human	Mouse
Entrez	351	11820
Ensembl	ENSG00000142192	ENSMUSG00000022892
UniProt	P05067	P12023
RefSeq (mRNA)	NM_201414; NM_000484; NM_001136016; NM_001136129; NM_001136130 NM_001136131; NM_001204301; NM_001204302; NM_001204303; NM_201413; NM_001385253	NM_001198823; NM_001198824; NM_001198825; NM_001198826; NM_007471
RefSeq (protein)	NP_000475; NP_001129488; NP_001129601; NP_001129602; NP_001129603 NP_001191230; NP_001191231; NP_001191232; NP_958816; NP_958817	NP_001185752; NP_001185753; NP_001185754; NP_001185755; NP_031497
Location (UCSC)	Chr 21: 25.88 – 26.17 Mb	Chr 16: 84.75 – 84.97 Mb
PubMed search
- Wikidata
View/Edit Human	View/Edit Mouse

(a) A low magnification image immediately after co-injection of red negatively charged and green glycine-conjugated beads showing the injection site, marked with an oil droplet, appearing as a round yellow sphere. Overlap of red and green fluorescence produces a yellow image. (b) At 50 min after injection, the red carboxylated beads have progressed in the anterograde direction (to the right) while the green glycine-conjugated beads have made no progress. (c)–(e) An axon co-injected with red APP-C beads and green glycine beads and imaged for 100 frames at 4 s intervals at 40× magnification. (c) Red channel (left) first frame; (center) 50 frames superimposed; (right) all 100 frames superimposed. Note the progression of individual beads towards the right, anterograde, side of the injection site heading towards the presynaptic terminal. (d) Two images of the green channel from the same video sequence; (left) first frame; (center) 100 frames superimposed. Note the lack of significant movement of the green glycine beads. (e) Both red and green channels from 100 frames superimposed of the same video as in (c) and (d). (f) Single bead trajectories at high magnification from a set of superimposed frames showing movements of beads.

Amyloid-beta precursor protein (APP) is an integral membrane protein expressed in many tissues and concentrated in the synapses of neurons. It functions as a cell surface receptor and has been implicated as a regulator of synapse formation, neural plasticity, antimicrobial activity, and iron export. It is coded for by the gene APP and regulated by substrate presentation. APP is best known as the precursor molecule whose proteolysis generates amyloid beta (Aβ), a polypeptide containing 37 to 49 amino acid residues, whose amyloid fibrillar form is the primary component of amyloid plaques found in the brains of Alzheimer's disease patients.

== Genetics ==
Amyloid-beta precursor protein is an ancient and highly conserved protein. In humans, the gene APP is located on chromosome 21 and contains 18 exons spanning 290 kilobases. Several alternative splicing isoforms of APP have been observed in humans, ranging in length from 639 to 770 amino acids, with certain isoforms preferentially expressed in neurons; changes in the neuronal ratio of these isoforms have been associated with Alzheimer's disease. Homologous proteins have been identified in other organisms such as Drosophila (fruit flies), C. elegans (roundworms), and all mammals. The amyloid beta region of the protein, located in the membrane-spanning domain, is not well conserved across species and has no obvious connection with APP's native-state biological functions.

Mutations in critical regions of amyloid precursor protein, including the region that generates amyloid beta, cause familial susceptibility to Alzheimer's disease. For example, several mutations outside the Aβ region associated with familial Alzheimer's have been found to dramatically increase production of Aβ.

A mutation (A673T) in the APP gene protects against Alzheimer's disease. This substitution is adjacent to the beta secretase cleavage site and results in a 40% reduction in the formation of amyloid beta in vitro.

== Structure ==
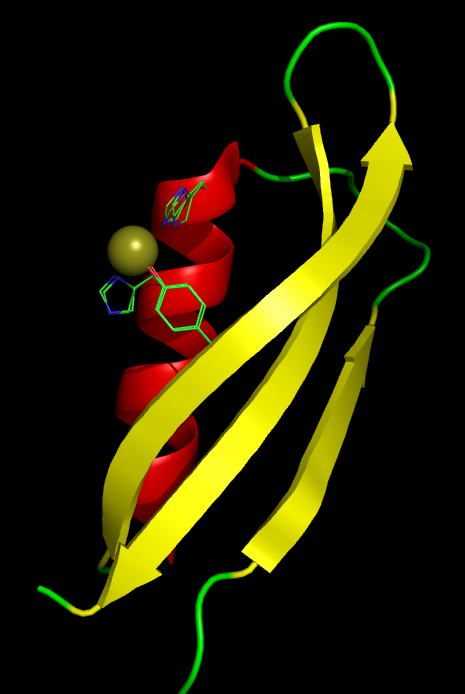
The metal-binding domain of APP with a bound copper ion. The side chains of the two histidine and one tyrosine residues that play a role in metal coordination are shown in the Cu(I) bound, Cu(II) bound, and unbound conformations, which differ by only small changes in orientation.

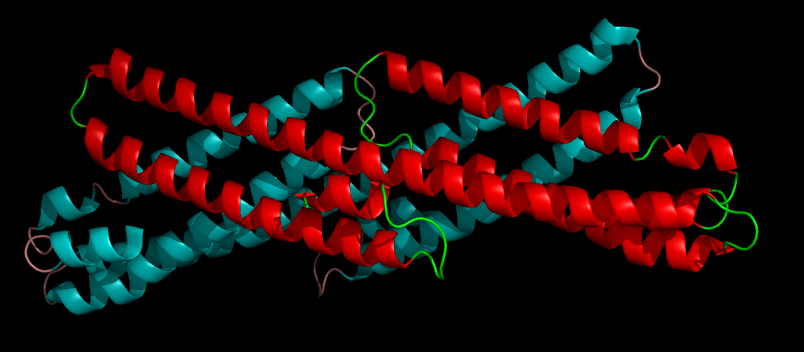
The extracellular E2 domain, a dimeric coiled coil and one of the most highly conserved regions of the protein from Drosophila to humans. This domain, which resembles the structure of spectrin, is thought to bind heparan sulfate proteoglycans.

A number of different structural domains that fold mostly on their own have been found in the APP sequence. The extracellular region, much larger than the intracellular region, is divided into the E1 and E2 domains, linked by an acidic domain (AcD); E1 contains two subdomains including a growth factor-like domain (GFLD) and a copper-binding domain (CuBD) interacting tightly together. A serine protease inhibitor domain, absent from the isoform differentially expressed in the brain, is found between acidic region and E2 domain. The complete crystal structure of APP has not yet been solved; however, individual domains have been successfully crystallized, the growth factor-like domain, the copper-binding domain, the complete E1 domain and the E2 domain.

== Isoform diversity ==
Amyloid-beta precursor protein is highly versatile with several isoforms generated through alternative splicing of its mRNA. The primary isoforms include APP695, APP751, and APP770, differing in their inclusion of certain exons, mainly exon 7 and 8. APP695 is predominantly expressed in neuronal cells and is crucial for normal neuronal function. APP751 and APP770 are more widely expressed in non-neuronal tissues but exhibit distinct expression patterns during neuron differentiation. The differential expression of these isoforms plays a significant role in cellular processes such as neurodevelopment, synaptic plasticity, and the pathogenesis of Alzheimer's disease. Understanding the isoform diversity of APP is essential for deciphering its various physiological and pathological roles.

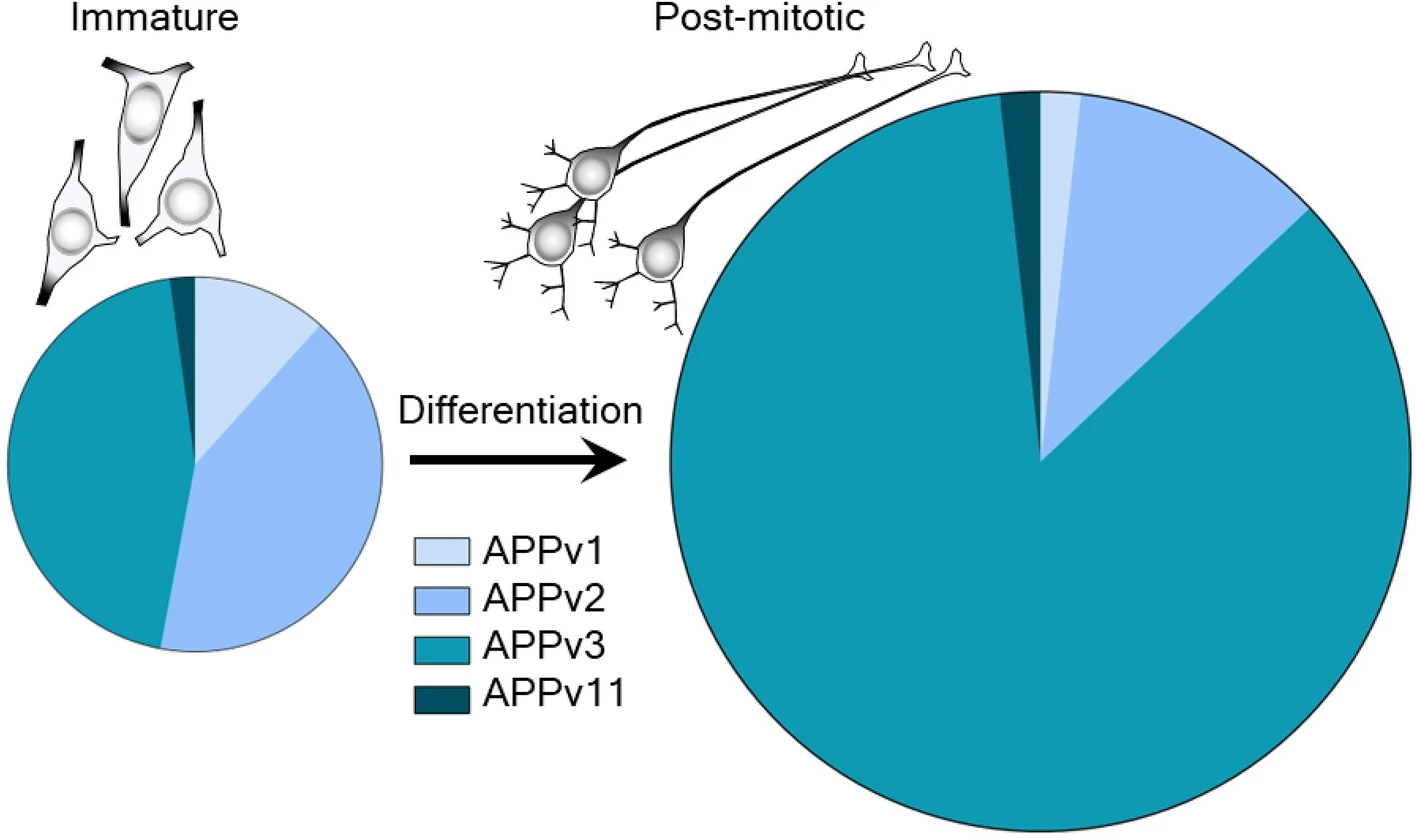
Amyloid-beta precursor protein exon 7 & 8 dependent transcript variant abundance (Transcript variant groups containing major transcript variant 1, 2, 3 and, 11) in the immature (proliferative) SH-SY5Y cells and SH-SY5Y derived post-mitotic neurons.

== Post-translational processing ==
APP undergoes extensive post-translational modification including glycosylation, phosphorylation, sialylation, and tyrosine sulfation, as well as many types of proteolytic processing to generate peptide fragments. It is commonly cleaved by proteases in the secretase family; alpha secretase and beta secretase both remove nearly the entire extracellular domain to release membrane-anchored carboxy-terminal fragments that may be associated with apoptosis. Cleavage by gamma secretase within the membrane-spanning domain after beta-secretase cleavage generates the amyloid-beta fragment; gamma secretase is a large multi-subunit complex whose components have not yet been fully characterized, but include presenilin, whose gene has been identified as a major genetic risk factor for Alzheimer's.

The amyloidogenic processing of APP has been linked to its presence in lipid rafts. When APP molecules occupy a lipid raft region of membrane, they are more accessible to and differentially cleaved by beta secretase, whereas APP molecules outside a raft are differentially cleaved by the non-amyloidogenic alpha secretase. Gamma secretase activity has also been associated with lipid rafts. The role of cholesterol in lipid raft maintenance has been cited as a likely explanation for observations that high cholesterol and apolipoprotein E genotype are major risk factors for Alzheimer's disease.

== Biological function ==
Although the native biological role of APP is of obvious interest to Alzheimer's research, thorough understanding has remained elusive. Experimental models of Alzheimer's disease are commonly used by researchers to gain better understandings about the biological function of APP in disease pathology and progression.

=== Synaptic formation and repair ===
The most-substantiated role for APP is in synaptic formation and repair; its expression is upregulated during neuronal differentiation and after neural injury. Roles in cell signaling, long-term potentiation, and cell adhesion have been proposed and supported by as-yet limited research. In particular, similarities in post-translational processing have invited comparisons to the signaling role of the surface receptor protein Notch.

APP knockout mice are viable and have relatively minor phenotypic effects including impaired long-term potentiation and memory loss without general neuron loss. A 2025 mouse study reported that conditional deletion of APP family proteins in excitatory forebrain neurons reduced synaptic localization of the NMDAR subunit GluN1 and suppressed spontaneous cortical and hippocampal neuronal activity, supporting a role for APP family proteins in NMDAR-dependent synaptic and circuit function in vivo. Furthermore, transgenic mice with upregulated APP expression have also been reported to show impaired long-term potentiation.

The logical inference is that because Aβ accumulates excessively in Alzheimer's disease its precursor, APP, would be elevated as well. However, neuronal cell bodies contain less APP as a function of their proximity to amyloid plaques. The data indicate that this deficit in APP results from a decline in production rather than an increase in catalysis. Loss of a neuron's APP may affect physiological deficits that contribute to dementia.

=== Somatic recombination ===
In neurons of the human brain, somatic recombination occurs frequently in the gene that encodes APP. Neurons from individuals with sporadic Alzheimer's disease show greater APP gene diversity due to somatic recombination than neurons from healthy individuals.

=== Anterograde neuronal transport ===
Molecules synthesized in the cell bodies of neurons must be conveyed outward to the distal synapses. This is accomplished via fast anterograde transport. It has been found that APP can mediate interaction between cargo and kinesin and thus facilitate this transport. Specifically, a short peptide 15-amino-acid sequence from the cytoplasmic carboxy-terminus is necessary for interaction with the motor protein.

Additionally, it has been shown that the interaction between APP and kinesin is specific to the peptide sequence of APP. In a recent experiment involving transport of peptide-conjugated colored beads, controls were conjugated to a single amino acid, glycine, such that they display the same terminal carboxylic acid group as APP without the intervening 15-amino-acid sequence mentioned above. The control beads were not motile, which demonstrated that the terminal COOH moiety of peptides is not sufficient to mediate transport.

=== Iron export ===
A different perspective on Alzheimer's is revealed by a mouse study that has found that APP possesses ferroxidase activity similar to ceruloplasmin, facilitating iron export through interaction with ferroportin; it seems that this activity is blocked by zinc trapped by accumulated Aβ in Alzheimer's. It has been shown that a single nucleotide polymorphism in the 5'UTR of APP mRNA can disrupt its translation.

The hypothesis that APP has ferroxidase activity in its E2 domain and facilitates export of Fe(II) is possibly incorrect since the proposed ferroxidase site of APP located in the E2 domain does not have ferroxidase activity.

As APP does not possess ferroxidase activity within its E2 domain, the mechanism of APP-modulated iron efflux from ferroportin has come under scrutiny. One model suggests that APP acts to stabilize the iron efflux protein ferroportin in the plasma membrane of cells thereby increasing the total number of ferroportin molecules at the membrane. These iron-transporters can then be activated by known mammalian ferroxidases (i.e. ceruloplasmin or hephaestin).

=== Hormonal regulation ===
The amyloid-β precursor protein (AβPP), and all associated secretases, are expressed early in development and play a key role in the endocrinology of reproduction – with the differential processing of AβPP by secretases regulating human embryonic stem cell (hESC) proliferation as well as their differentiation into neural precursor cells (NPC). The pregnancy hormone human chorionic gonadotropin (hCG) increases AβPP expression and hESC proliferation while progesterone directs AβPP processing towards the non-amyloidogenic pathway, which promotes hESC differentiation into NPC.

AβPP and its cleavage products do not promote the proliferation and differentiation of post-mitotic neurons; rather, the overexpression of either wild-type or mutant AβPP in post-mitotic neurons induces apoptotic death following their re-entry into the cell cycle. It is postulated that the loss of sex steroids (including progesterone) but the elevation in luteinizing hormone, the adult equivalent of hCG, post-menopause and during andropause drives amyloid-β production and re-entry of post-mitotic neurons into the cell cycle.

== Interactions ==
Amyloid precursor protein has been shown to interact with:

- APBA1,
- APBA2,
- APBA3,
- APBB1,
- APPBP1,
- APPBP2,
- BCAP31,
- BLMH
- CLSTN1,
- CAV1,
- COL25A1,
- Fibulin-1,
- GSN,
- HSD17B10, and
- SHC-transforming protein 1.

APP interacts with reelin, a protein implicated in a number of brain disorders, including Alzheimer's disease.

APP specifically interacts with TRPC6 to inhibit its cleavage by γ-secretase and reduce Aβ production.
