= Collagen =

Most abundant structural protein in animals

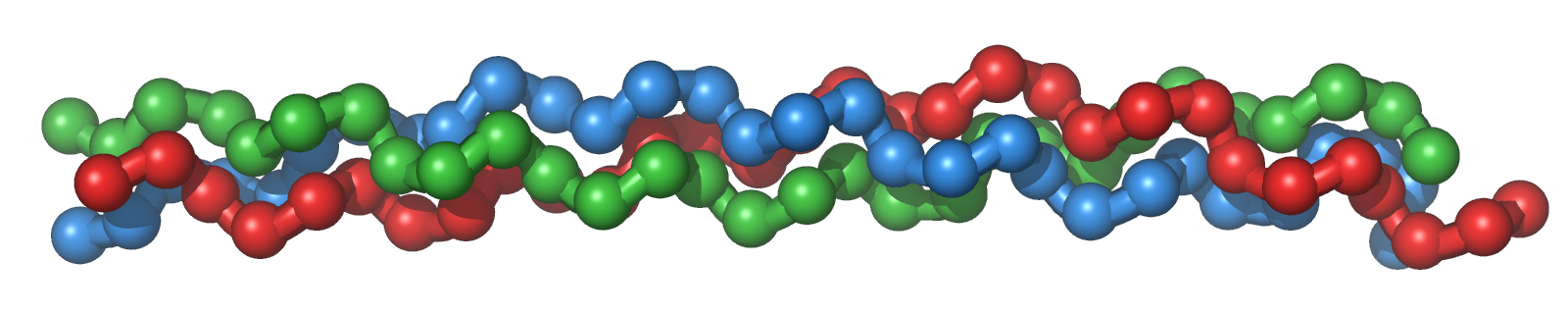
The triple helix: three left-handed polyproline type II helices (red, green, blue) assemble by an axial hydrogen bond to form a right-handed triple helix, the tertiary structure of collagen.

Collagen (/ˈkɒlədʒən/) is the main structural protein in the extracellular matrix of the connective tissues of many animals. It is one of the most abundant proteins in mammals making up 12% to 17% of overall protein content and 25-35% in bones. Amino acids are bound together to form a triple helix of elongated fibril known as a collagen helix. It is mostly found in cartilage, bones, tendons, ligaments, and skin. Vitamin C is vital for collagen synthesis as it is involved in the post-transcriptional modification of changing proline to hydroxyproline.

Depending on the degree of mineralization, collagen tissues may be rigid (bone) or compliant (tendon) or have a gradient from rigid to compliant (cartilage). Collagen is also abundant in corneas, blood vessels, the gut, intervertebral discs, and dentin. In muscle tissue, it serves as a major component of the endomysium. Collagen constitutes 1% to 2% of muscle tissue and 6% by weight of skeletal muscle. The fibroblast is the most common cell creating collagen in animals.

Collagen is used in numerous food products, such as in gelatin employed to thicken or flavor a food matrix. Although marketed as a dietary supplement and skincare product, there is little evidence it is beneficial for skin health. In biomaterials used in medicine, collagen has useful properties for artificial skin and healing of severe burns and wounds.

== Etymology ==
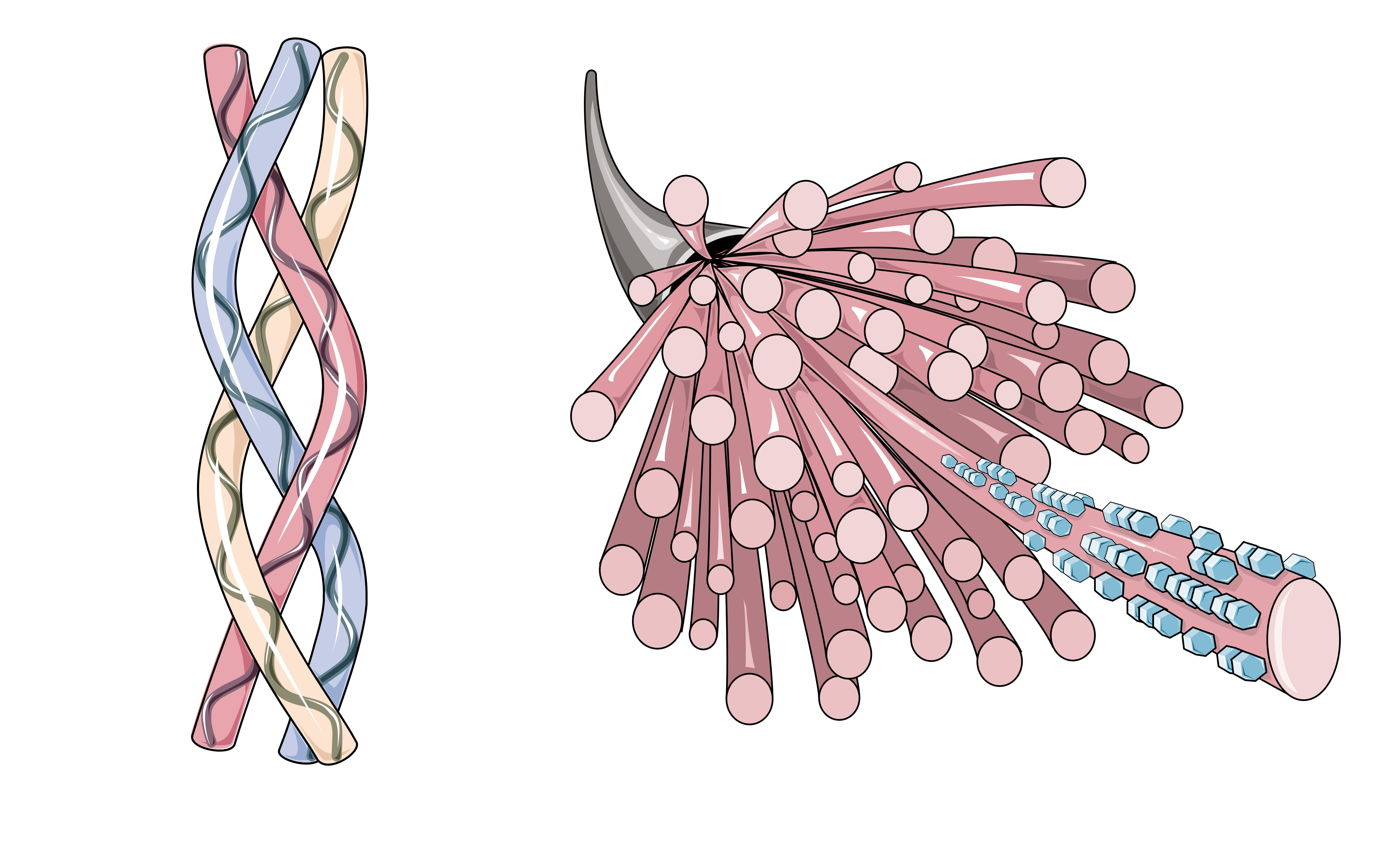
Collagen: triple helix (left) and fibril formed by many triple-helical bundles (right)

The word collagen is derived from the Greek κόλλα, kólla, meaning "glue", and the suffix -gen, meaning "giving birth to", as later used in the French collagène. The word was first used in English in 1843.

== Characteristics ==
Collagen is one of the long, fibrous structural proteins whose functions are quite different from those of globular proteins, such as enzymes. Tough bundles of collagen called "collagen fibers" are a major component of the extracellular matrix that supports most tissues and gives cells structure from the outside, but collagen is also found inside certain cells. Collagen has great tensile strength and is the main component of fascia, cartilage, ligaments, tendons, bone, and skin. Along with elastin and soft keratin, it is responsible for skin strength and elasticity, and its degradation leads to wrinkles that accompany aging.

Collagen strengthens blood vessels and plays a role in tissue development. It is present in the cornea and lens of the eye in crystalline form. It may be one of the most abundant proteins in the fossil record, given that it appears to fossilize frequently, even in bones from the Mesozoic and Paleozoic.

=== Mechanical properties ===
Collagen is a complex hierarchical material with mechanical properties that vary significantly across different scales.

On the molecular scale, atomistic and coarse-grained modeling simulations, as well as numerous experimental methods, have led to several estimates of the Young's modulus of collagen at the molecular level. Only above a certain strain rate is there a strong relationship between elastic modulus and strain rate, possibly due to the large number of atoms in a collagen molecule. The length of the molecule is also important, where longer molecules have lower tensile strengths than shorter ones due to short molecules having a large proportion of hydrogen bonds being broken and reformed.

On the fibrillar scale, collagen has a lower modulus compared to the molecular scale, and varies depending on geometry, scale of observation, deformation state, and hydration level. By increasing the crosslink density from zero to 3 per molecule, the maximum stress the fibril can support increases from 0.5 GPa to 6 GPa.

Limited tests have been done on the tensile strength of the collagen fiber, but generally it has been shown to have a lower Young's modulus compared to fibrils.

When studying the mechanical properties of collagen, tendon is often chosen as the ideal material because it is close to a pure and aligned collagen structure. However, at the macro, tissue scale, the vast number of structures that collagen fibers and fibrils can be arranged into results in highly variable properties. For example, tendon has primarily parallel fibers, whereas skin consists of a net of wavy fibers, resulting in a much higher strength and lower ductility in tendon compared to skin. The mechanical properties of collagen at multiple hierarchical levels are given.

Young's modulus of collagen at multiple hierarchical levels
Hierarchical Level	Young's modulus
Molecular (via atomistic modeling)	2.4-7 GPa
Fibril	0.2-0.8 GPa
Fiber (measured from cross-linked rat tail tendon)	1.10 GPa
Fiber (measured from non-cross-linked rat tail tendon)	50-250 MPa

Collagen is known to be a viscoelastic solid. When the collagen fiber is modeled as two Kelvin-Voigt models in series, each consisting of a spring and a dashpot in parallel, the strain in the fiber can be modeled according to the following equation:

$\frac{d\epsilon_D}{d\epsilon_T}=\alpha + (\beta - \alpha) exp[-\gamma\frac{\epsilon_T}{\dot{\epsilon_T}}]$

where α, β, and γ are defined materials properties, ε_{D} is fibrillar strain, and ε_{T} is total strain.

== Types ==
As of 2011, 28 types of human collagen have been identified, described, and classified according to their structure. This diversity shows collagen's diverse functionality. All of the types contain at least one triple helix. Over 90% of the collagen in humans is Type I and Type III collagen.

- Fibrillar (type I, II, III, V, XI)
- Non-fibrillar
  - FACIT (fibril-associated collagens with interrupted triple helices) (types IX, XII, XIV, XVI, XIX, XXI)
  - Short-chain (types VIII, X)
  - Basement membrane (type IV)
  - Multiplexin (multiple triple helix domains with interruptions) (types XV, XVIII)
  - MACIT (membrane-associated collagens with interrupted triple helices) (types XIII, XVII)
  - Microfibril-forming (type VI)
  - Anchoring fibrils (type VII)

The five most common types are:

- Type I: skin, tendon, vasculature, organs, bone (main component of the organic part of bone)
- Type II: cartilage (main collagenous component of cartilage)
- Type III: reticulate (main component of reticular fibers), commonly found alongside type I
- Type IV: forms basal lamina, the epithelium-secreted layer of the basement membrane
- Type V: found in the skin (especially around hair follicles and sweat glands) and research suggests it is involved in wound healing and bridging the dermis and epidermis. Also found in the placenta.

== In humans ==
=== Cardiac ===
The collagenous cardiac skeleton, which includes the four heart valve rings, is histologically, elastically and uniquely bound to cardiac muscle. The cardiac skeleton also includes the separating septa of the heart chambers – the interventricular septum and the atrioventricular septum. Collagen contribution to the measure of cardiac performance summarily represents a continuous torsional force opposed to the fluid mechanics of blood pressure emitted from the heart. The collagenous structure that divides the upper chambers of the heart from the lower chambers is an impermeable membrane that excludes both blood and electrical impulses through typical physiological means. With support from collagen, atrial fibrillation never deteriorates to ventricular fibrillation. Collagen is layered in variable densities with smooth muscle mass. The mass, distribution, age, and density of collagen all contribute to the compliance required to move blood back and forth. Individual cardiac valvular leaflets are folded into shape by specialized collagen under variable pressure. Gradual calcium deposition within collagen occurs as a natural function of aging. Calcified points within collagen matrices show contrast in a moving display of blood and muscle, enabling methods of cardiac imaging technology to arrive at ratios essentially stating blood in (cardiac input) and blood out (cardiac output). Pathology of the collagen underpinning of the heart is understood within the category of connective tissue disease.

=== Wound healing ===
Throughout the four phases of wound healing, collagen performs the following functions:

- Guiding: collagen fibers guide fibroblasts because they migrate along a connective tissue matrix.
- Chemotaxis: collagen fibers have a large surface area which attracts fibrogenic cells which help healing.
- Nucleation: in the presence of certain neutral salt molecules, collagen can act as a nucleating agent causing formation of fibrillar structures.
- Hemostasis: Blood platelets interact with the collagen to make a hemostatic plug.

=== Skin ===
In the skin, collagen and elastin have complementary roles within the extracellular matrix: collagen provides tensile strength and structural support, whereas elastin is the principal component of elastic fibers that allows skin to stretch and recoil toward its original shape. With intrinsic aging, dermal atrophy results from a combination of collagen loss, degeneration of the elastic fiber network, and reduced hydration; chronic ultraviolet exposure further disorganizes both collagen and elastic fibers, a process associated with photoaging and solar elastosis. While collagen provides tensile strength, elastin is primarily responsible for the skin's ability to stretch and recoil, and age-related loss of skin elasticity is more closely linked to a decline in elastin than to collagen loss — making care for elastin an important part of addressing skin laxity and firmness.

Skin aging involves changes in the extracellular matrix rather than changes in collagen alone. Intrinsic aging is associated with dermal thinning, loss and alteration of collagen, degeneration of the elastic fiber network, and reduced hydration. Chronic ultraviolet exposure further alters the organization of dermal collagen and elastic fibers, producing characteristic changes associated with photoaging. Because collagen and elastin contribute different mechanical properties to the dermal extracellular matrix, preservation of both networks is important for maintaining skin structure and elasticity.

Histology of skin of the neck. The lower 2/3 is the reticular dermis which is rich in collagen.

Higher magnification of the reticular skin, showing thin, randomly arranged collagen fibers (rich in Type III). H&E stain

Histology of dermis of skin on polarized light microscopy, with collagen being birefringent, making parts of it bright

== Structure ==
Collagen is generally made of triple helices, each consisting of a polypeptide chain. Each triple-helical bundle is called a tropocollagen, which often join together to form larger collagen aggregates such as fibrils.

=== Chain ===
The amino acid composition of collagen is atypical for proteins, particularly with respect to its high hydroxyproline content. The most common motifs in collagen's amino acid sequence are glycine-proline-X and glycine-X-hydroxyproline, where X is any amino acid other than glycine, proline or hydroxyproline.

A distinctive feature of collagen is the regular arrangement of amino acids in each of the three chains of these collagen subunits. The sequence often follows the pattern Gly-Pro-X or Gly-X-Hyp, where X may be any of various other amino acid residues. Proline or hydroxyproline constitute about 1/6 of the total sequence. With glycine accounting for the 1/3 of the sequence, this means approximately half of the collagen sequence is not glycine, proline or hydroxyproline, a fact often missed due to the distraction of the unusual GX_{1}X_{2} character of collagen alpha-peptides. The high glycine content of collagen is important with respect to stabilization of the collagen helix, as this allows the very close association of the collagen fibers within the molecule, facilitating hydrogen bonding and the formation of intermolecular cross-links. This kind of regular repetition and high glycine content is found in only a few other fibrous proteins, such as silk fibroin.

Collagen is not only a structural protein. Due to its key role in the determination of cell phenotype, cell adhesion, tissue regulation, and infrastructure, many sections of its non-proline-rich regions have cell or matrix association/regulation roles. The relatively high content of proline and hydroxyproline rings, with their geometrically constrained carboxyl and (secondary) amino groups, along with the rich abundance of glycine, accounts for the tendency of the individual polypeptide strands to form left-handed helices spontaneously, without any intrachain hydrogen bonding.

Because glycine is the smallest amino acid with no side chain, it plays a unique role in fibrous structural proteins. In collagen, Gly is required at every third position because the assembly of the triple helix puts this residue at the interior (axis) of the helix, where there is no space for a larger side group than glycine's single hydrogen atom. For the same reason, the rings of the Pro and Hyp must point outward. These two amino acids help stabilize the triple helix – Hyp even more so than Pro because of a stereoelectronic effect; a lower concentration of them is required in animals such as fish, whose body temperatures are lower than most warm-blooded animals. Lower proline and hydroxyproline contents are characteristic of cold-water, but not warm-water fish; the latter tend to have similar proline and hydroxyproline contents to mammals. The lower proline and hydroxyproline contents of cold-water fish and other poikilotherm animals lead to their collagen having a lower thermal stability than mammalian collagen. This lower thermal stability means that gelatin derived from fish collagen is not suitable for many food and industrial applications.

==== Amino acids ====
Collagen has an unusual amino acid composition and sequence:

- Glycine is found at almost every third residue. The smallest amino acid residue, it allows the makes triple-helix shape possible.
- Proline makes up about 17% of collagen. A rigid residue, it too makes the triple-helix possible by "snapping" in the chain.
- Lysine, although only found at a normal-looking frequency of 3–4%, is required for crosslinking.

Collagen contains two unusual derivative amino acids not directly inserted during translation. These amino acids are found at specific locations relative to glycine and are modified post-translationally by different enzymes, both of which require vitamin C as a cofactor.

- Hydroxyproline derived from proline. The added hydroxyl group makes more hydrogen bonds, strengthening the triple-helix.
- Hydroxylysine derived from lysine – depending on the type of collagen, varying numbers of hydroxylysines are glycosylated (mostly having disaccharides attached). It is required for crosslinking.

The table below lists average amino acid composition for fish and mammal skin.

Amino acid	Abundance in mammal skin (residues/1000)	Abundance in fish skin (residues/1000)
Glycine	329	339
Proline	126	108
Alanine	109	114
Hydroxyproline	95	67
Glutamic acid	74	76
Arginine	49	52
Aspartic acid	47	47
Serine	36	46
Lysine	29	26
Leucine	24	23
Valine	22	21
Threonine	19	26
Phenylalanine	13	14
Isoleucine	11	11
Hydroxylysine	6	8
Methionine	6	13
Histidine	5	7
Tyrosine	3	3
Cysteine	1	1
Tryptophan	0	0

=== Tropocollagen ===
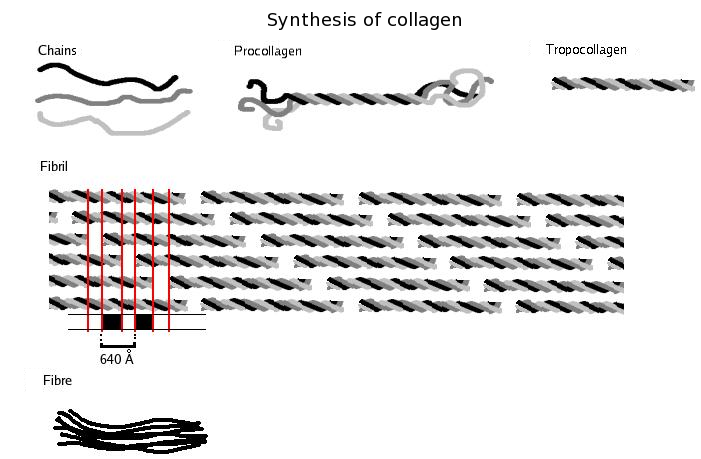
Three polypeptides coil to form tropocollagen. Many tropocollagens then bind together to form a fibril, and many of these then form a fiber.

Tropocollagen is a triple helix. It can be made of three identical chains, or different (but still similar) ones in 2:1 or 1:1:1 ratio. It is approximately 300 nm long and 1.5 nm in diameter, and it is made up of three polypeptide strands (called alpha peptides, see step 2), each of which has the conformation of a left-handed helix – this should not be confused with the right-handed alpha helix. These three left-handed helices are twisted together into a right-handed triple helix or "super helix", a cooperative quaternary structure stabilized by many hydrogen bonds. With type I collagen and possibly all fibrillar collagens, if not all collagens, each triple-helix associates into a right-handed super-super-coil referred to as the collagen microfibril. Each microfibril is interdigitated with its neighboring microfibrils to a degree that might suggest they are individually unstable, although within collagen fibrils, they are so well ordered as to be crystalline.

=== Aggregates ===
The tropocollagen subunits spontaneously self-assemble, with regularly staggered ends, into even larger arrays in the extracellular spaces of tissues. Additional assembly of fibrils is guided by fibroblasts, which deposit fully formed fibrils from fibripositors. In the fibrillar collagens, molecules are staggered to adjacent molecules by about 67 nm (a unit that is referred to as 'D' and changes depending upon the hydration state of the aggregate). In each D-period repeat of the microfibril, there is a part containing five molecules in cross-section, called the "overlap", and a part containing only four molecules, called the "gap". These overlap and gap regions are retained as microfibrils assemble into fibrils, and are thus viewable using electron microscopy. The triple helical tropocollagens in the microfibrils are arranged in a quasihexagonal packing pattern.

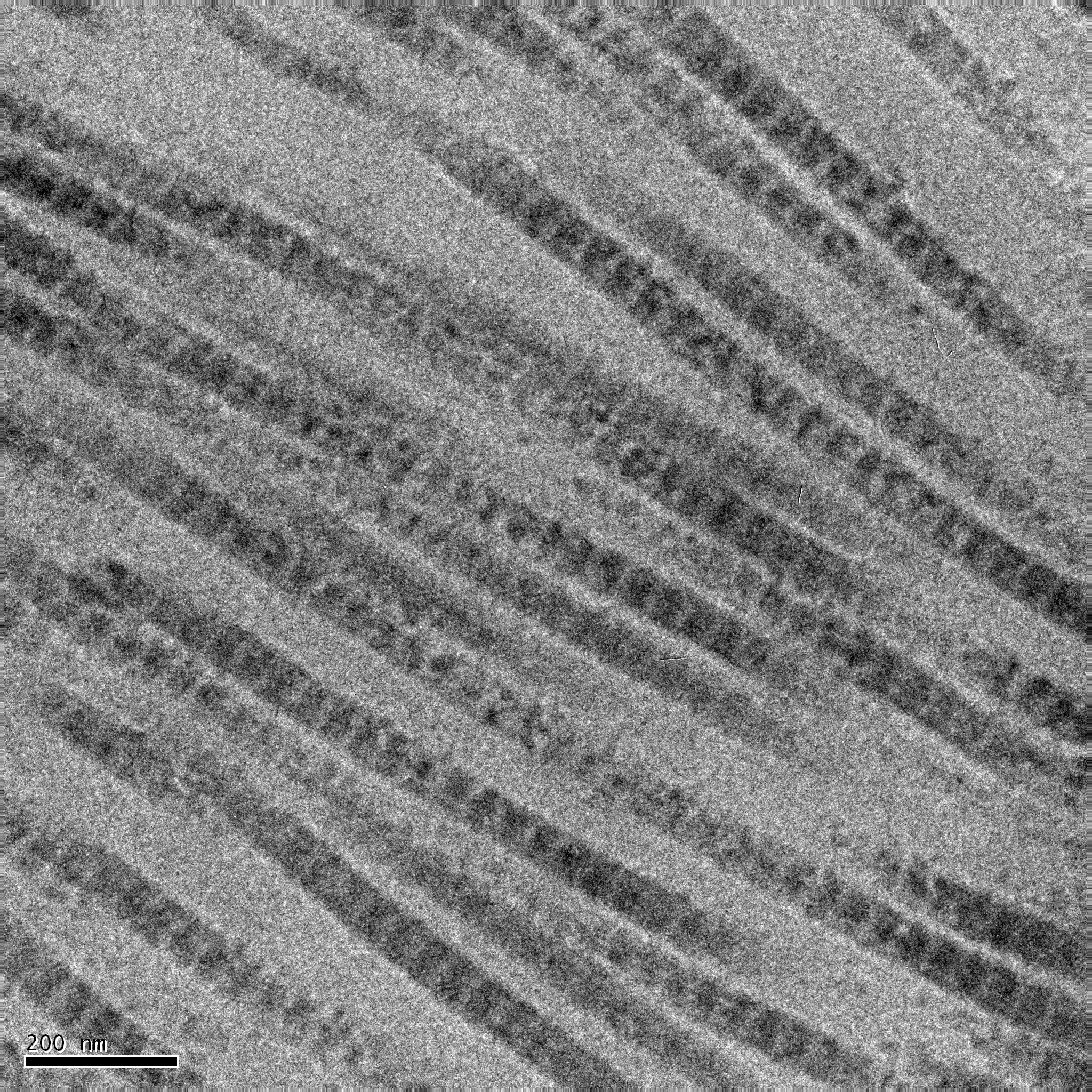
The D-period of collagen fibrils results in visible 67nm bands when observed by electron microscopy.

There is some covalent crosslinking within the triple helices and a variable amount of covalent crosslinking between tropocollagen helices forming well-organized aggregates (such as fibrils). Larger fibrillar bundles are formed with the aid of several different classes of proteins (including different collagen types), glycoproteins, and proteoglycans to form the different types of mature tissues from alternate combinations of the same key players. Collagen's insolubility was a barrier to the study of monomeric collagen until it was found that tropocollagen from young animals can be extracted because it is not yet fully crosslinked. However, advances in microscopy techniques (i.e. electron microscopy (EM) and atomic force microscopy (AFM)) and X-ray diffraction have enabled researchers to obtain increasingly detailed images of collagen structure in situ. These later advances are particularly important to better understanding the way in which collagen structure affects cell–cell and cell–matrix communication and how tissues are constructed in growth and repair and changed in development and disease. For example, using AFM–based nanoindentation it has been shown that a single collagen fibril is a heterogeneous material along its axial direction with significantly different mechanical properties in its gap and overlap regions, correlating with its different molecular organizations in these two regions.

Collagen fibrils/aggregates are arranged in different combinations and concentrations in various tissues to provide varying tissue properties. In bone, entire collagen triple helices lie in a parallel, staggered array. 40 nm gaps between the ends of the tropocollagen subunits (approximately equal to the gap region) probably serve as nucleation sites for the deposition of long, hard, fine crystals of the mineral component, which is hydroxylapatite (approximately) Ca_{10}(OH)_{2}(PO_{4})_{6}. Type I collagen gives bone its tensile strength.

== Synthesis ==
First, a three-dimensional stranded structure is assembled, mostly composed of the amino acids glycine and proline. This is the collagen precursor procollagen. Then, procollagen is modified by the addition of hydroxyl groups to the amino acids proline and lysine. This step is important for later glycosylation and the formation of collagen's triple helix structure. Because the hydroxylase enzymes performing these reactions require vitamin C as a cofactor, a long-term deficiency in this vitamin results in impaired collagen synthesis and scurvy. These hydroxylation reactions are catalyzed by the enzymes prolyl 4-hydroxylase and lysyl hydroxylase. The reaction consumes one ascorbate molecule per hydroxylation. Collagen synthesis occurs both intracellularly and extracellularly.

The most common form of collagen is fibrillary collagen. Another common form is meshwork collagen, which is often involved in the formation of filtration systems. All types of collagen are triple helices, but differ in the make-up of their alpha peptides created in step 2. Below we discuss the formation of fibrillary collagen.

1. Transcription of mRNA: Synthesis begins with turning on genes associated with the formation of a particular alpha peptide (typically alpha 1, 2 or 3). About 45 genes are associated with collagen formation, each coding for a specific mRNA sequence, and are typically named with the "COL" prefix. These 45 genes encode the 28 collagen types described in vertebrates.
2. Pre-pro-peptide formation: The created mRNA exits the cell nucleus into the cytoplasm. There, it links with the ribosomal subunits and is translated into a peptide. The peptide goes into the endoplasmic reticulum for post-translational processing. It is directed there by a signal recognition particle on the endoplasmic reticulum, which recognizes the peptide's N-terminal signal sequence (the early part of the sequence). The processed product is a pre-pro-peptide called preprocollagen.
3. Pro-collage formation: Three modifications of the pre-pro-peptide form the alpha peptide:
  1. The signal peptide on the N-terminal is removed. This molecule is called 'propeptide.'
  2. Lysines and prolines are hydroxylated by the enzymes 'prolyl hydroxylase' and 'lysyl hydroxylase', producing hydroxyproline and hydroxylysine. This helps in cross-linking the alpha peptides. This enzymatic step requires vitamin C as a cofactor. In scurvy, the lack of hydroxylation of prolines and lysines causes a looser triple helix (which is formed by three alpha peptides).
  3. Glycosylation occurs by adding either glucose or galactose monomers onto the hydroxyl groups that were placed onto lysines, but not on prolines.
  4. Three of the hydroxylated and glycosylated propeptides twist into a triple helix (except for its ends), forming procollagen. It is packaged into a transfer vesicle destined for the Golgi apparatus.
4. Modification and secretion: In the Golgi apparatus, the procollagen goes through one last post-translational modification, adding oligosaccharides (not monosaccharides as in step 3). Then it is packaged into a secretory vesicle to be secreted from the cell.
5. Tropocollagen formation: Outside the cell, propeptides at both ends of procollagen are removed by specific enzymes – procollagen N-proteinases and C-proteinases – producing tropocollagen. Defects in this step produce collagenopathies such as dermatosparaxis-type Ehlers–Danlos syndrome. For type III collagen this processing is delayed rather than absent: the C-propeptide is cleaved first, leaving a soluble pN-collagen III intermediate, and the N-propeptide is then removed more slowly by the procollagen N-proteinase ADAMTS-2.
6. Action of lysyl oxidase
  Collagen fibril formation: Lysyl oxidase, a copper-dependent enzyme, acts on lysines and hydroxylysines, producing aldehyde groups, which eventually form covalent bonds between tropocollagen molecules. This polymer of tropocollagen is called a collagen fibril. The mature crosslink, pyridinoline or deoxypyridinoline, connects three peptide chains together.

=== Collagen I formation ===
Most collagen forms in a similar manner, but the following process is typical for type I:

1. Inside the cell
  1. Two types of alpha chains – alpha-1 and alpha 2, are formed during translation on ribosomes along the rough endoplasmic reticulum (RER). These peptide chains, known as preprocollagen, have registration peptides on each end and a signal peptide.
  2. Polypeptide chains are released into the lumen of the RER.
  3. Signal peptides are cleaved inside the RER; these are known as pro-alpha chains.
  4. Hydroxylation of lysine and proline amino acids occurs inside the lumen. This process is dependent on and consumes ascorbic acid (vitamin C) as a cofactor.
  5. Glycosylation of specific hydroxylysine residues occurs.
  6. A triple alpha helical structure is formed inside the endoplasmic reticulum from two alpha-1 chains and one alpha-2 chain.
  7. Procollagen is shipped to the Golgi apparatus, where it is packaged and secreted into the extracellular space by exocytosis.
2. Outside the cell
  1. Registration peptides are cleaved, and tropocollagen is formed by procollagen peptidase.
  2. Multiple tropocollagen molecules form collagen fibrils, via covalent cross-linking (aldol reaction) by lysyl oxidase which links hydroxylysine and lysine residues. Multiple collagen fibrils form into collagen fibers.
  3. Collagen may be attached to cell membranes via several types of protein, including fibronectin, laminin, fibulin, and integrin.

== Diseases ==
One thousand mutations have been identified in 12 out of more than 20 types of collagen. These mutations can lead to various diseases at the tissue level.

Osteogenesis imperfecta – Caused by a mutation in type 1 collagen, a dominant autosomal disorder, results in weak bones and irregular connective tissue; some cases can be mild while others can be lethal. Mild cases have lowered levels of collagen type 1, while severe cases have structural defects in collagen.

Chondrodysplasias – Skeletal disorder believed to be caused by a mutation in type 2 collagen, further research is being conducted to confirm this.

Ehlers–Danlos syndrome – Thirteen different types of this disorder, which lead to deformities in connective tissue, are known. Some of the rarer types can be lethal, leading to the rupture of arteries. Each syndrome is caused by a different mutation. For example, the vascular type (vEDS) of this disorder is caused by a mutation in collagen type 3.

Alport syndrome – Can be passed on genetically, usually as X-linked dominant, but also as both an autosomal dominant and autosomal recessive disorder. Those with the condition have problems with their kidneys and eyes, and loss of hearing can also develop during childhood or adolescence.

Knobloch syndrome – Caused by a mutation in the COL18A1 gene that codes for the production of collagen XVIII. Patients present with protrusion of the brain tissue and degeneration of the retina; an individual who has family members with the disorder is at an increased risk of developing it themselves since there is a hereditary link.

=== Associated disorders ===
Collagen-related diseases most commonly arise from genetic defects or nutritional deficiencies that affect the biosynthesis, assembly, posttranslational modification, secretion, or other processes involved in normal collagen production.

Genetic defects of collagen genes
Type	Notes	Gene(s)	Disorders
I	This is the most abundant collagen of the human body. It is present in scar tissue, the end product when tissue heals by repair. It is found in tendons, skin, artery walls, cornea, the endomysium surrounding muscle fibers, fibrocartilage, and the organic part of bones and teeth.	COL1A1, COL1A2	Osteogenesis imperfecta, Ehlers–Danlos syndrome, infantile cortical hyperostosis a.k.a. Caffey's disease
II	Hyaline cartilage, makes up 50% of all cartilage protein. Vitreous humour of the eye.	COL2A1	Collagenopathy, types II and XI
III	This is the collagen of granulation tissue and is produced quickly by young fibroblasts before the tougher type I collagen is synthesized. Reticular fiber. Also found in artery walls, skin, intestines and the uterus	COL3A1	Ehlers–Danlos syndrome, Dupuytren's contracture
IV	Basal lamina; eye lens. Also serves as part of the filtration system in capillaries and the glomeruli of nephron in the kidney.	COL4A1, COL4A2, COL4A3, COL4A4, COL4A5, COL4A6	Alport syndrome, Goodpasture's syndrome
V	Most interstitial tissue, assoc. with type I, associated with placenta	COL5A1, COL5A2, COL5A3	Ehlers–Danlos syndrome (classical)
VI	Most interstitial tissue, assoc. with type I	COL6A1, COL6A2, COL6A3, COL6A5 (Note: COL29A1 was originally proposed (2007) as a distinct epidermal collagen associated with atopic dermatitis, but it is now generally considered identical to COL6A5, an α5 chain of type VI collagen, and is not counted among the 28 established collagen types.)	Ullrich congenital muscular dystrophy, intermediate collagen VI-related dystrophy, Bethlem myopathy, Atopic dermatitis.
VII	Forms anchoring fibrils in dermoepidermal junctions	COL7A1	Epidermolysis bullosa dystrophica
VIII	Some endothelial cells	COL8A1, COL8A2	Posterior polymorphous corneal dystrophy 2
IX	FACIT collagen, cartilage, assoc. with type II and XI fibrils	COL9A1, COL9A2, COL9A3	EDM2 and EDM3
X	Hypertrophic and mineralizing cartilage	COL10A1	Schmid metaphyseal dysplasia
XI	Cartilage	COL11A1, COL11A2	Collagenopathy, types II and XI
XII	FACIT collagen, interacts with type I containing fibrils, decorin and glycosaminoglycans	COL12A1	–
XIII	Transmembrane collagen, interacts with integrin a1b1, fibronectin and components of basement membranes like nidogen and perlecan.	COL13A1	–
XIV	FACIT collagen, also known as undulin	COL14A1	–
XV	–	COL15A1	–
XVI	FACIT collagen	COL16A1	–
XVII	Transmembrane collagen, also known as BP180, a 180 kDa protein	COL17A1	Bullous pemphigoid and certain forms of junctional epidermolysis bullosa
XVIII	Source of endostatin	COL18A1	–
XIX	FACIT collagen	COL19A1	–
XX	–	COL20A1	–
XXI	FACIT collagen	COL21A1	–
XXII	FACIT collagen	COL22A1	–
XXIII	MACIT collagen	COL23A1	–
XXIV	–	COL24A1	–
XXV	–	COL25A1	–
XXVI	–	EMID2	–
XXVII	–	COL27A1	–
XXVIII	–	COL28A1	–

In addition to the above-mentioned disorders, excessive deposition of collagen occurs in scleroderma.

Cortisol and other glucocorticoids stimulates degradation of (skin) collagen into amino acids. This explains the connective tissue problems seen in Cushing's syndrome and steroid-induced osteoporosis.

== Commercial production ==
The dominant route for industrial production of collagen is the same as for gelatin: from skin, bones, and connective tissues of animals. The number of farm animals required has led to deforestation, as has occurred in Paraguay, where large collagen producers buy large numbers of cattle hides from regions that have been clear-cut for cattle grazing.

When high-purity collagen of a specific type is desired, the collagen may be produced with recombinant protein technology: by copying the collagen gene(s) into an organism, it becomes a "factory" for this specific type of collagen.

== Uses ==
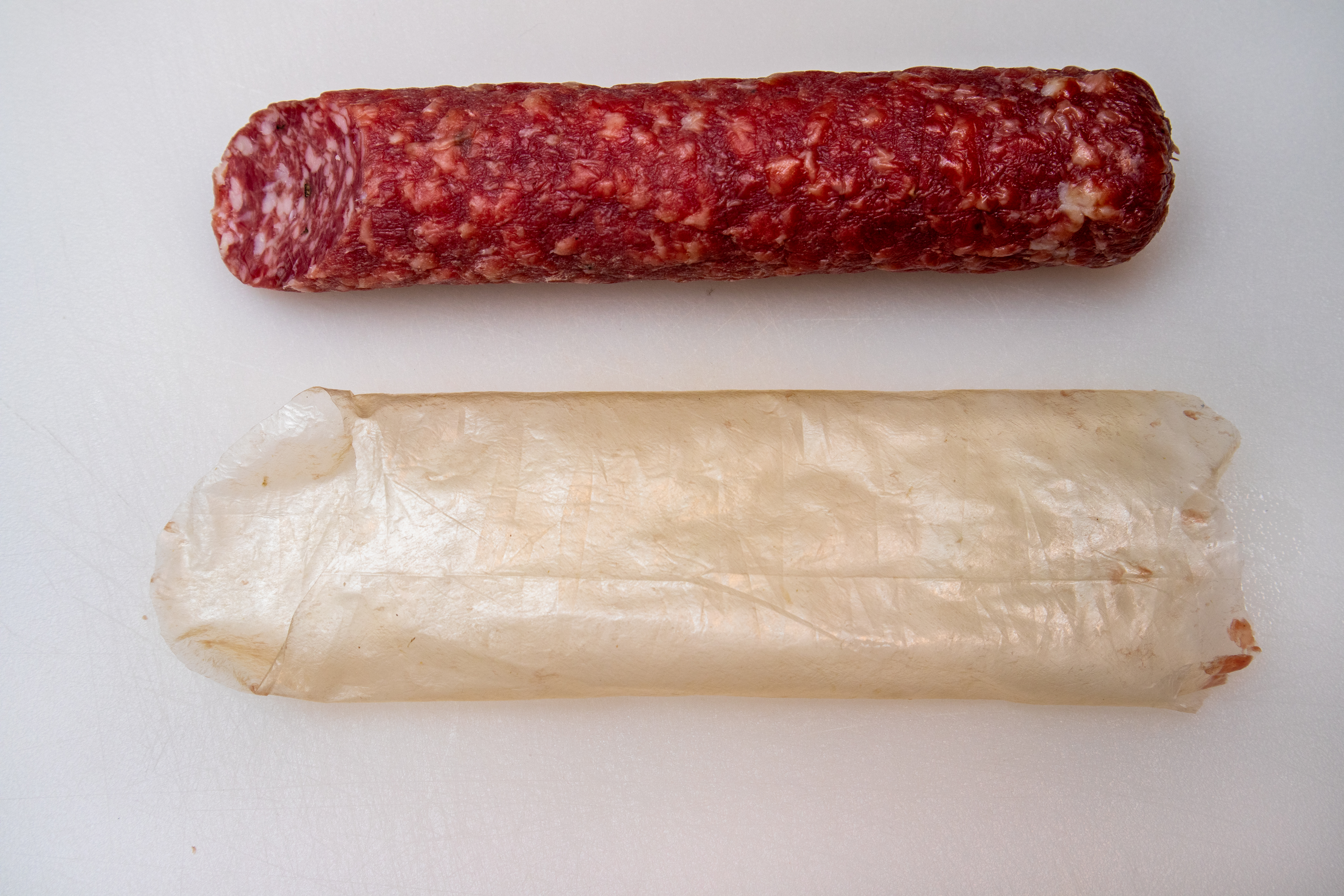
A salami and the collagen casing (below) it came in

Collagen has a wide variety of applications. In the medical industry, it is used in cosmetic surgery and burn surgery. An example of collagen use for food manufacturing is in casings for sausages.

If collagen is subject to sufficient denaturation, such as by heating, the three tropocollagen strands separate partially or completely into globular domains, containing a different secondary structure to the normal collagen polyproline II (PPII) of random coils. This process describes the formation of gelatin, which is used in many foods, including flavored gelatin desserts. Besides food, gelatin has been used in pharmaceutical, cosmetic, and photography industries.

From the Greek for glue, kolla, the word collagen means "glue producer" and refers to the early process of boiling the skin and sinews of horses and other animals to obtain glue. Collagen adhesive was used by Egyptians about 4,000 years ago, and Native Americans used it in bows about 1,500 years ago. The oldest glue in the world, carbon-dated as more than 8,000 years old, was found to be collagen – used as a protective lining on rope baskets and embroidered fabrics, to hold utensils together, and in crisscross decorations on human skulls. Collagen normally converts to gelatin, but survived due to dry conditions. Animal glues are thermoplastic, softening again upon reheating, so they are still used in making musical instruments such as fine violins and guitars, which may have to be reopened for repairs – an application incompatible with tough, synthetic plastic adhesives, which are permanent. Animal sinews and skins, including leather, have been used to make useful articles for millennia.

Gelatin-resorcinol-formaldehyde glue (and with formaldehyde replaced by less-toxic pentanedial and ethanedial) has been used to repair experimental incisions in rabbit lungs.

=== Uses on humans ===
==== Bone, tendon, and dental repair ====
Common bone defects result from osteoporosis, traumatic fractures, periodontal disease, birth defects, and genetic disorders. Collagen is used in bone repairs because its triple-helix structure makes it a strong, versatile compound in biomaterials made with collagen, which provides a matrix for cells to infiltrate and help to proliferate osteoblast deposits.

Tendon injuries occurring from overuse or trauma can be facilitated for healing by enabling vascular regrowth and fibroblast production using collagen-based biomaterial scaffolds.

For dental applications, an absorbable collagen sponge can be packed into a root canal or the space after tooth extraction to promote blood clotting, gum regeneration, and antibacterial activity.

==== Tissue regeneration ====
Collagen scaffolds are used in tissue regeneration, whether in sponges, thin sheets, gels, or fibers. Collagen has favorable properties for tissue regeneration, such as pore structure, permeability, hydrophilicity, and stability in vivo. Collagen scaffolds also support deposition of cells, such as osteoblasts and fibroblasts, and once inserted, facilitate growth to proceed normally.

==== Reconstructive surgery ====
Collagens are widely used in the construction of artificial skin substitutes used for managing severe burns and wounds. These collagens may be derived from cow, horse, pig, or even human sources; and are sometimes used in combination with silicones, glycosaminoglycans, fibroblasts, growth factors, and other substances.

==== Wound dressing ====
As a component of skin tissue, collagen is a base material for medical products to support wound healing. When collagen is made available to the wound bed, closure can occur, avoiding wound deterioration and severe surgical procedures, such as amputation.

Collagen is used as a natural wound dressing because it has properties that artificial wound dressings do not have. It resists bacteria, which is vitally important in wound dressing. As a burn dressing, collagen aids healing by enabling granulation tissue to grow over the burn.

==== Food, supplement, and topical use ====
In 2024, some 55% of the collagen market in the United States was for use in foods, including such products as sausage casings, thickening agents, preservation methods, and ice cream.

Although collagen dietary supplements may be marketed to improve skin elasticity and reduce wrinkles, there is no good evidence that ingestion of collagen has an effect on collagen production or skin health. When consumed by mouth, collagen is digested into its hydrolyzed peptides and amino acids, and therefore the intact collagen product is not incorporated into damaged or wrinkled skin, but possibly its constituents are.

Topical skincare products containing intact collagen are advertised to replace or enhance natural skin collagen, but such topical collagen has poor permeability, does not penetrate the skin, and is not absorbed. As of 2025, there is no clinical evidence to support the use of oral collagen supplements or topical products to improve wrinkles or skin aging.

==== Cosmetics ====
Collagen is a protein found in many tissues of the body, such as cartilage, bone, tendons, and skin (including around hair follicles, and nail beds). Collagen cremes are marketed as cosmetics even though collagen cannot penetrate the skin because its fibers are too large. Partially hydrolyzed forms of collagen and low molecular weight collagen peptides, such as glycyl-prolyl-hydroxyproline, are more commonly used in cosmetics products than collagen itself in the unproven belief that topical absorption is improved.

=== Use in basic research ===
Collagen is used in laboratory studies for cell culture, studying cell behavior and cellular interactions with the extracellular environment. Collagen is also widely used as a bioink for 3D bioprinting and biofabrication of 3D tissue models.

== History ==
The molecular and packing structures of collagen eluded scientists over decades of research. The first evidence that it possesses a regular structure at the molecular level was presented in the mid-1930s. Research then concentrated on the conformation of the collagen monomer, producing several competing models, although correctly dealing with the conformation of each individual peptide chain. The triple-helical "Madras" model, proposed by G. N. Ramachandran in 1955, provided an accurate model of quaternary structure in collagen. This model was supported by further studies of higher resolution in the late 20th century.

The packing structure of collagen has not been defined to the same degree outside of the fibrillar collagen types, although it has been long known to be hexagonal. As with its monomeric structure, several conflicting models propose either that the packing arrangement of collagen molecules is 'sheet-like', or is microfibrillar. The microfibrillar structure of collagen fibrils in tendon, cornea and cartilage was imaged directly by electron microscopy in the late 20th century and early 21st century. The microfibrillar structure of rat tail tendon was modeled as being closest to the observed structure, although it oversimplified the topological progression of neighboring collagen molecules, and so did not predict the correct conformation of the discontinuous D-periodic pentameric arrangement termed microfibril.

== See also ==
- Collagen hybridizing peptide, a peptide that can bind to denatured collagen
- Hypermobility spectrum disorder
- Metalloprotease inhibitor
- Osteoid, a collagen-containing component of bone
- Collagen loss
