= Collagen hybridizing peptide =

Type of synthetic peptide

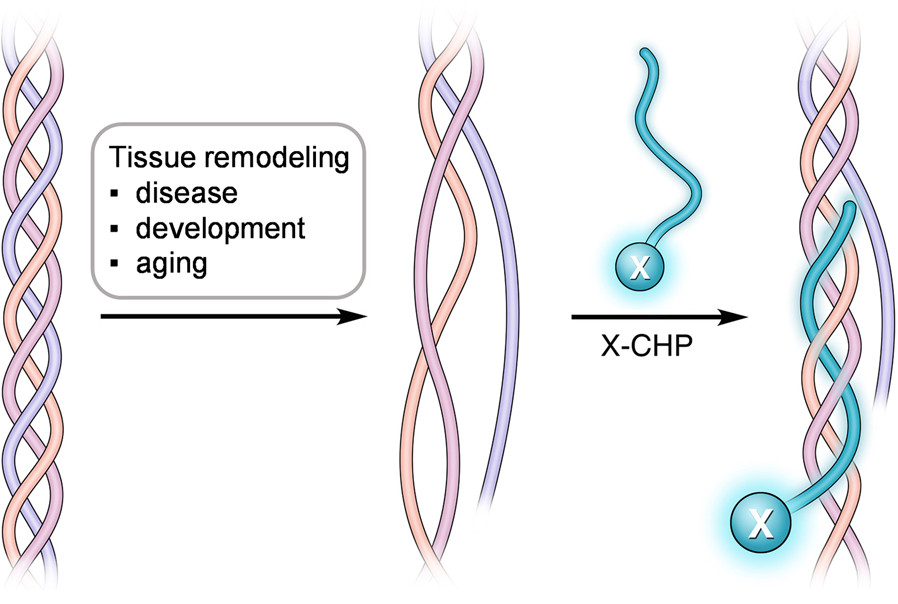
Schematic of a CHP strand (labeled with an "X" tag) hybridizing to denatured collagen chains and forming a collagen triple helix. During disease progression, tissue development, or ageing, collagen can be extensively degraded by collagenolytic proteases, causing its triple helix to unfold at the physiological temperature due to reduced thermal stability. X may represent a biotin or fluorescent tag.

A collagen hybridizing peptide (CHP) is a synthetic peptide sequence with typically 6 to 10 repeating units of the Gly-Xaa-Yaa amino acid triplet, which mimics the hallmark sequence of natural collagens. A CHP peptide usually possesses a high content of proline and hydroxyproline in the Xaa and Yaa positions, which confers it a strong propensity to form the collagen's unique triple helix conformation. In the single-stranded (monomeric) status, the peptide can recognize denatured collagen strands in tissues by forming a hybridized triple helix with the collagen strands. This occurs via the triple helical chain assembly and inter-chain hydrogen bonding, in a manner similar to primers binding to melted DNA strands during PCR. The binding does not depend on a specific sequence or epitope on collagen, enabling CHPs to target denatured collagen chains of different types.

== Collagen, CHP, CMP, and CLP ==
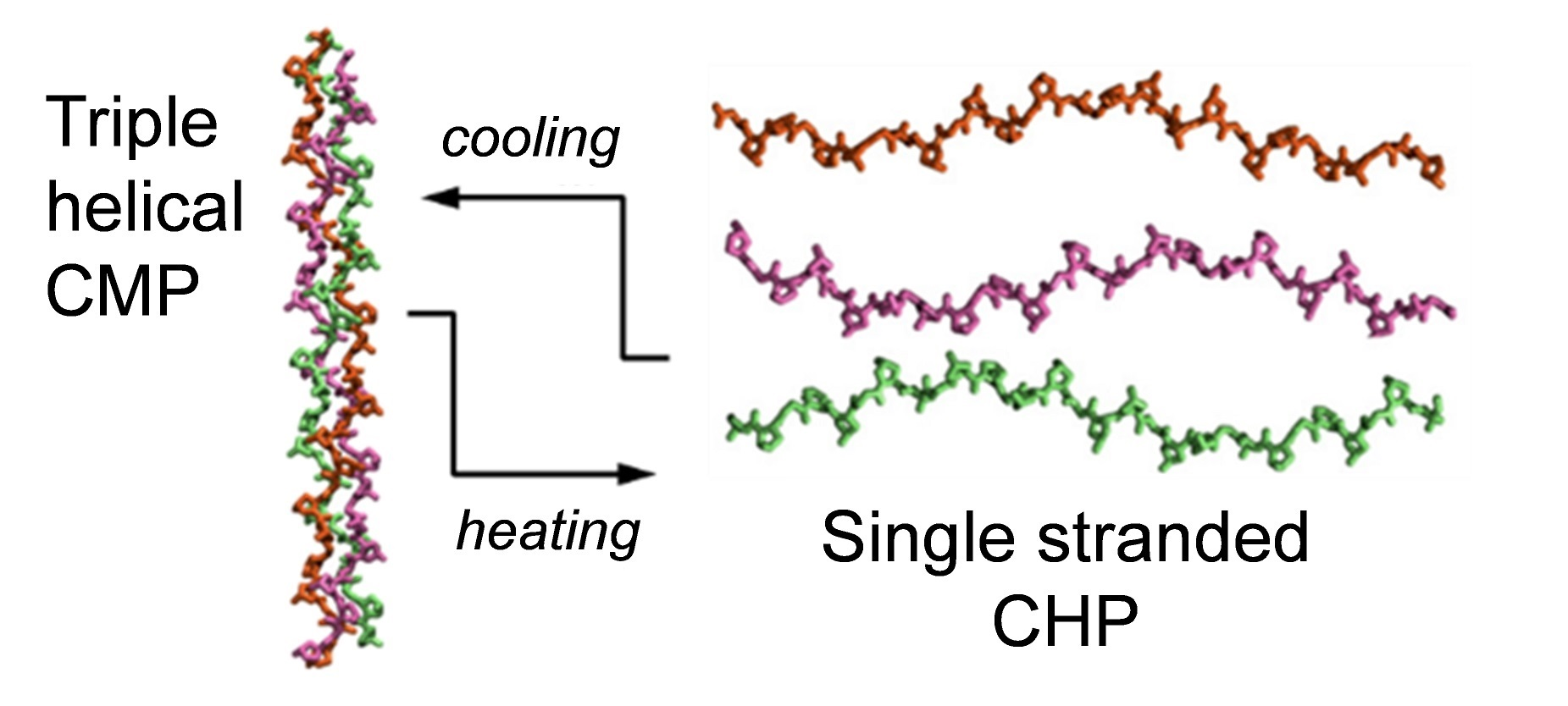
Schematic showing relationship between the CMP and CHP. Triple helical CMPs can be heated (above a defined temperature) to dissociate into monomeric CHPs; upon cooling, CHP strands can re-assemble into a triple helix over time.

Collagen is the main component of the extracellular matrix (ECM). The collagen superfamily consists of 28 different types of collagen. Although the function and hierarchical structure of these collagens may vary, they all share the defining structural feature known as the triple helix, where three left handed polyproline II-type (PPII) helices assemble to form a right-handed supercoiled helical motif. Short synthetic peptides known as collagen mimetic peptides (CMPs) or collagen-like peptides (CLPs) have played a major role in elucidating the 3D structure of the collagen triple helix, its folding kinetics, and thermal stability as small triple helical models. CMPs, CLPs, and CHPs are all very similar in terms of their amino acid sequences but only when CMPs or CLPs are heated above their melting temperatures, do they exist in the dissociated, single-stranded state and can be considered as CHPs.

== Binding mechanism ==
Single-stranded CHPs bind to denatured collagen chains and gelatin in a manner that is unique from other targeting mechanisms, in that they specifically recognize a unique structural motif (collagen triple helix) for folding and chain assembly, as opposed to specific epitopes binding that is seen for monoclonal antibodies (mAbs), for example. Due to their unique targeting mechanism, CHPs have a high binding specificity towards denatured collagen chains but have almost no affinity for intact (triple helical) collagen. CHPs can broadly target collagen chains that have been denatured by thermal, chemical, mechanical, or enzymatic processes, as well as multiple collagen types (e.g., Col I, II, IV). Studies also showed CHPs and their fluorophore conjugates have superior stability in contact with serum.

== Denatured collagen as a biomarker for tissue remodelling and damage ==
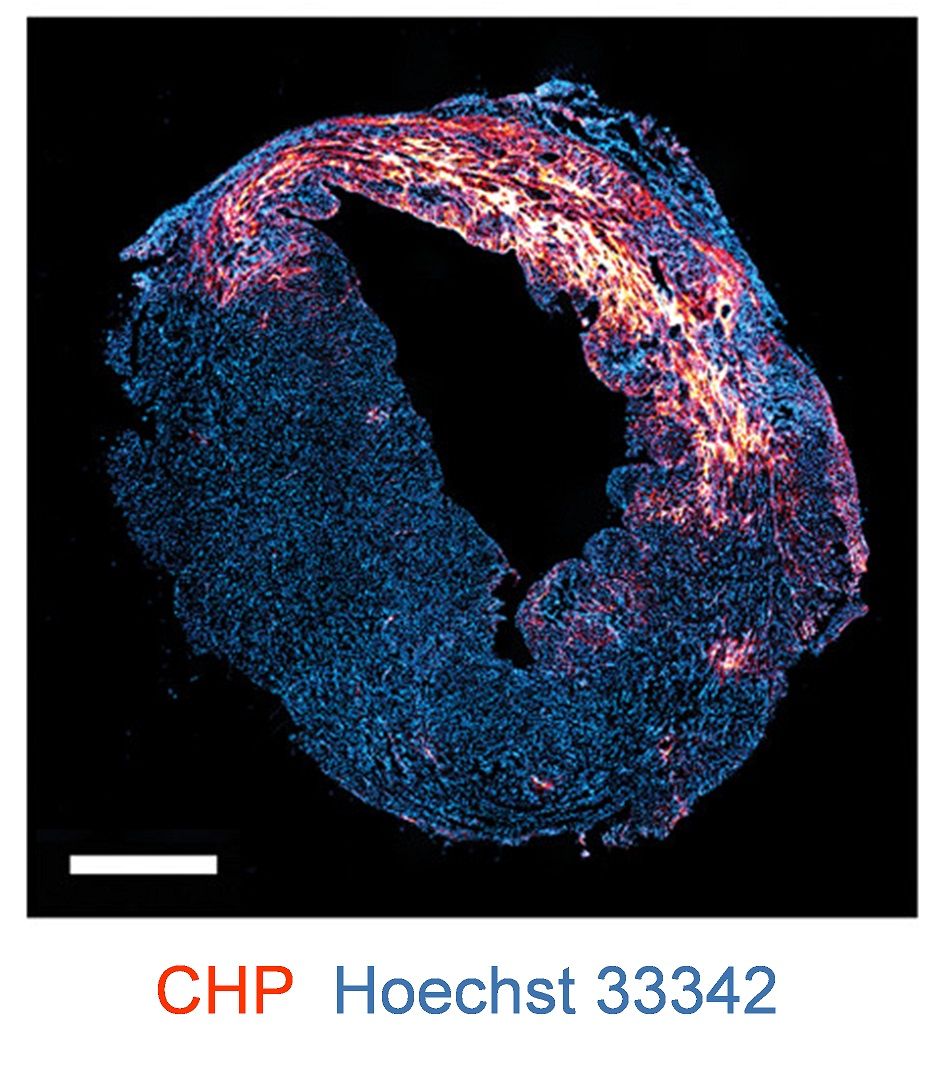
A fluorescence image of an axial cross section of a mouse heart at day 14 post myocardial infarction, stained with Hoechst 33342 (blue) and biotin-labeled CHP (detected with AlexaFluor647-streptavidin, red). Scale bar: 1 mm.

Controlled collagen turnover is crucial for embryonic development, organ morphogenesis, as well as tissue maintenance and repair. However, changes of collagen homeostasis are associated with numerous diseases and pathological conditions. Excessive collagen degradation may be associated with cancer metastasis, skin ageing, arthritis, and osteoporosis. CHPs can target tissues undergoing remodelling based on their ability to bind to degraded and unfolded collagen strands through triple helix formation. As a targeting moiety, CHPs offer great potential in histopathology, diagnostics, and drug delivery for a wide range of diseases.

Most methods for the evaluation of collagen denaturation in disease states are indirect, such as detecting matrix metalloproteinase (MMP) activity or quantifying collagen peptide fragments in urine, serum, or synovial fluid. Using conventional methods for directly targeting collagen, researchers have to relied on collagen binding peptides selected by phage display, derived from collagen binding proteins, or antibodies raised against collagens. Unfortunately, these compounds cannot target denatured collagens which are unstructured and do not present a defined 3D epitope. In addition, antibodies that were reported to distinguish specific degraded collagen fragments can only recognize one or few collagen types. In contrast, CHPs, in principle, can bind to all types of denatured collagens.

== Applications ==
=== Tissue staining ===
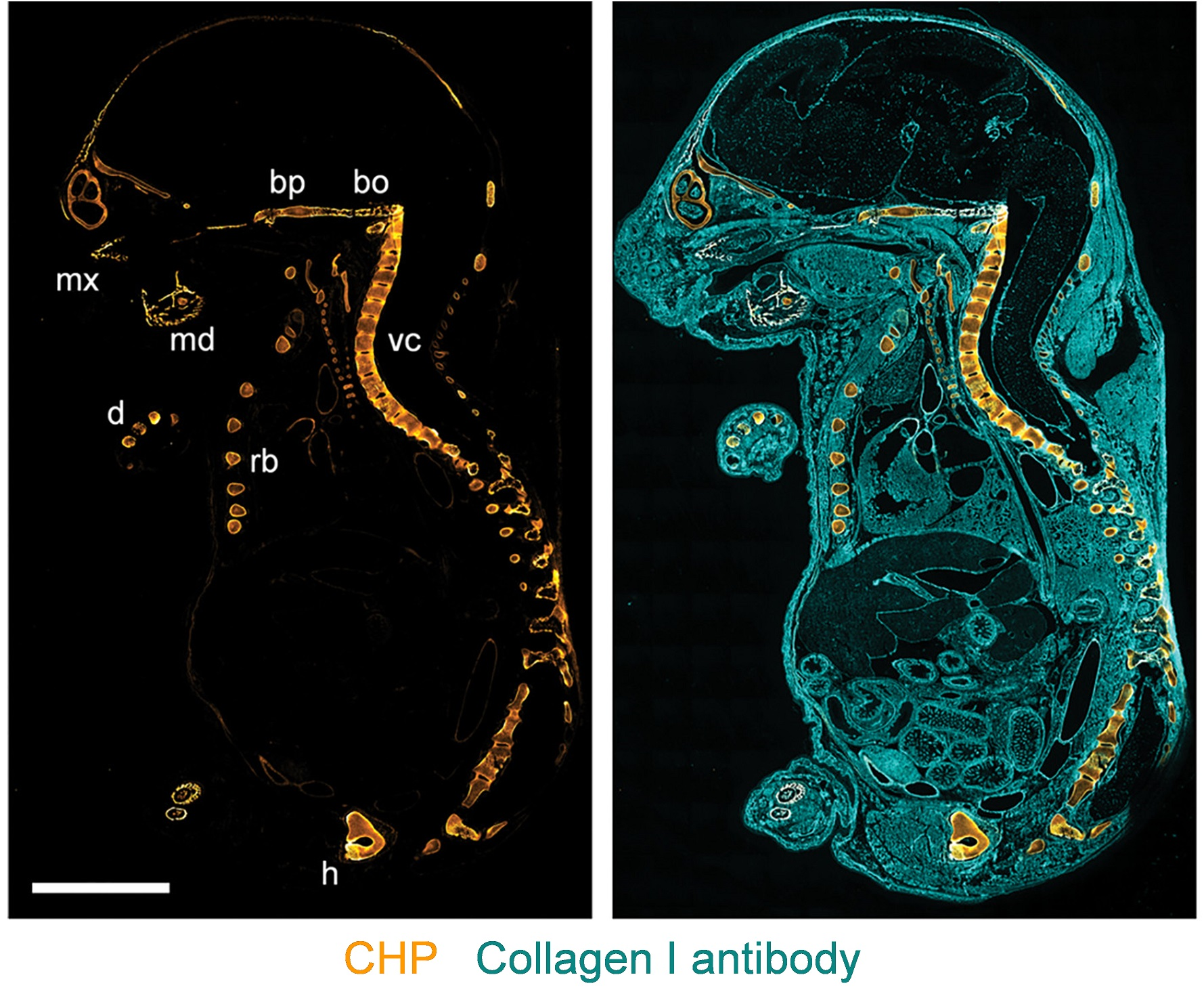
A fluorescence image of a sagittal section of an 18 d.p.c. mouse embryo double stained with biotinylated-CHP (detected by AlexaFluor647-streptavidin, orange) and an anti-collagen I antibody (detected by AlexaFluor555-labeled donkey anti-rabbit IgG H&L, cyan). mx, maxilla; md, mandibular bone; bp, basisphenoid bone; bo, basioccipital bone; vc, vertebral column; rb, rib; h, hipbone; d, digital bones. Scale bar: 3 mm.

Fluorophore- or biotin-labeled CHPs are used as a staining agent for detecting collagen degradation and denaturation via immunofluorescence and immunohistochemistry applications. CHPs can stain frozen tissue sections, formalin-fixed paraffin embedded (FFPE) sections, as well as fresh tissues. CHP is applicable to tissue specimens from multiple species and a range of diseases, such as myocardial infarction, arthritis, nephritis, and fibrosis.

=== In vivo imaging ===
CHPs can also be labelled with near-infrared fluorophores for in vivo fluorescent imaging.

=== Collagen identification ===
CHPs can be used for visualizing many different types of collagen bands in SDS-PAGE gels. Collagen is denatured by heating in the presence of SDS prior to loading the gel. The collagen bands are visualized through CHP-collagen hybridization when the gels are stained by fluorescently-labeled CHPs.

=== Detecting mechanical damage to connective tissue ===
Collagen offers mechanical strength in load bearing tissues in the body such as tendons, ligaments, and bone. As forces are applied to these tissues, the collagen triple helix can be damaged and unwind, and CHPs allow for molecular level detection of mechanical damage in such connective tissues.
