= Von Willebrand factor type A domain =

Protein Domain

von Willebrand factor type A domain
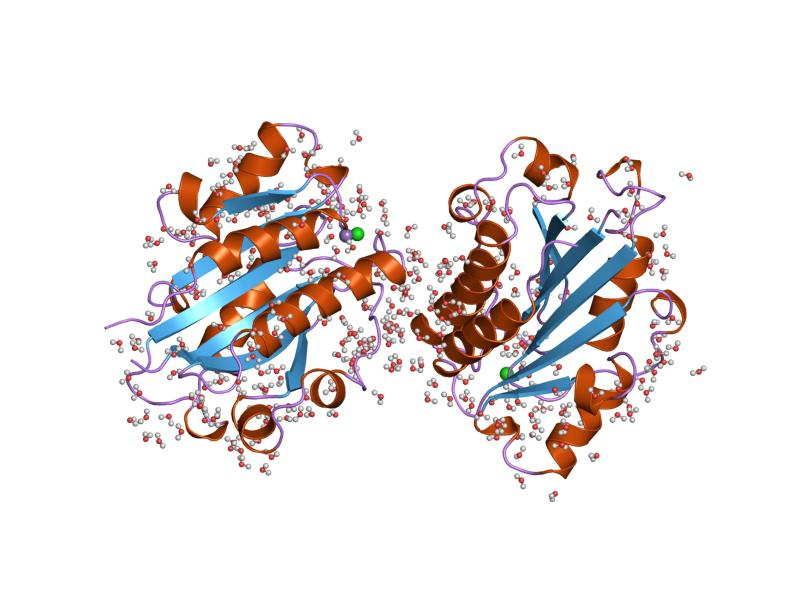
- Structure of the I-domain from the CD11a/CD18 (LFA-1, alpha L beta 2) integrin.

Identifiers
- Symbol: VWA
- Pfam: PF00092
- Pfam clan: CL0128
- InterPro: IPR002035
- SCOP2: 1lfa / SCOPe / SUPFAM
- CDD: cd00198
Available protein structures:
- Pfam: structures / ECOD
- PDB: RCSB PDB; PDBe; PDBj
- PDBsum: structure summary
- PDB: 1shuX:44-213 1tzni:44-213 1shtX:44-213 1t6bY:44-212 1rrkA:270-468 1rs0A:270-468 1q0pA:270-468 1rtkA:270-468 1qc5A:172-331 1pt6A:172-338 1qcyA:172-333 1ck4B:172-355 1mhpB:172-355 1dziA:174-355 1aoxA:174-361 1v7pC:174-361 1pqbA:174-361 1ao3B:1691-1864 1atzB:1691-1864 1fe8C:1691-1864 2adfA:1691-1864 1n9zA:150-328 1bho1:150-328 1bhq2:150-328 1idn2:150-328 1ido :150-328 1jlm :150-328 1mf7A:150-328 1na5A:150-328 1m1uA:150-328 1n3yA:151-329 1mq9A:156-327 1cqpA:156-327 1xddB:156-327 1dgqA:156-327 1lfaA:156-327 1xuoA:156-327 1zon :156-327 1mq8B:156-327 1ij4L:156-327 1rd4C:156-327 1mqaA:156-327 1zooB:156-327 1xdgB:156-327 1zopB:156-327 1mjnA:156-327 1t0pA:156-326 1ijbA:1277-1457 1m10A:1277-1457 1sq0A:1277-1457 1ijkA:1277-1457 1auq :1277-1457 1u0nA:1277-1457 1uexC:1277-1457 1oakA:1277-1457 1fnsA:1277-1457 1u0oC:1277-1453

The von Willebrand factor type A (vWA) domain is a protein domain named after its occurrence in von Willebrand factor (vWF), a large multimeric glycoprotein found in blood plasma. Mutant forms of vWF are involved in the aetiology of bleeding disorders. This type A domain is the prototype for a protein superfamily (InterPro: IPR036465; see also Pfam clan).

The vWA domain is found in various plasma proteins: complement factors B, C2, CR3 and CR4; the integrins (I-domains); collagen types VI, VII, XII and XIV; and other extracellular proteins. Although the majority of vWA-containing proteins are extracellular, the most ancient ones present in all eukaryotes are all intracellular proteins involved in functions such as transcription, DNA repair, ribosomal and membrane transport and the proteasome. A common feature appears to be involvement in multiprotein complexes. Proteins that incorporate vWA domains participate in numerous biological events (e.g. cell adhesion, migration, homing, pattern formation, and signal transduction), involving interaction with a large array of ligands. A number of human diseases arise from mutations in vWA domains.

Secondary structure prediction from 75 aligned vWA sequences has revealed a largely alternating sequence of alpha-helices and beta-strands. Fold recognition algorithms were used to score sequence compatibility with a library of known structures: the vWA domain fold was predicted to be a doubly wound, open, twisted beta-sheet flanked by alpha-helices. 3D structures have been determined for the I-domains of integrins CD11b (with bound magnesium) and CD11a (with bound manganese). The domain adopts a classic alpha/beta Rossmann fold and contains an unusual metal ion coordination site at its surface. It has been suggested that this site represents a general metal ion-dependent adhesion site (MIDAS) for binding protein ligands. The residues constituting the MIDAS motif in the CD11b and CD11a I-domains are completely conserved, but the manner in which the metal ion is coordinated differs slightly.

== Human proteins containing this domain ==
ANTXR1; ANTXR2; BF; C2; CACHD1; CACNA2D1; CACNA2D2; CACNA2D3; CACNA2D4; CFB; CLCA1; CLCA2; CLCA4; COCH; COL12A1; COL14A1; COL20A1; COL21A1; COL22A1; COL28; COL6A1; COL6A2; COL6A3; COL7A1; COLA1L; CaCC1; ITGA1; ITGA10; ITGA11; ITGA2; ITGAD; ITGAE; ITGAL; ITGAM; ITGAX; ITIH1; ITIH2; ITIH3; ITIH4; ITIH5; ITIH5L; LOC285929; LOC340267; LOC389462; LOH11CR2A; MATN1; MATN2; MATN3; MATN4; PARP4; SVEP1（SEL-OB）; VIT; VWA1; VWA2; VWF; hCLCA1; hCLCA2; CMG2;
