= Fibrous protein =

Non-soluble proteins with elongated or sheet-like structures

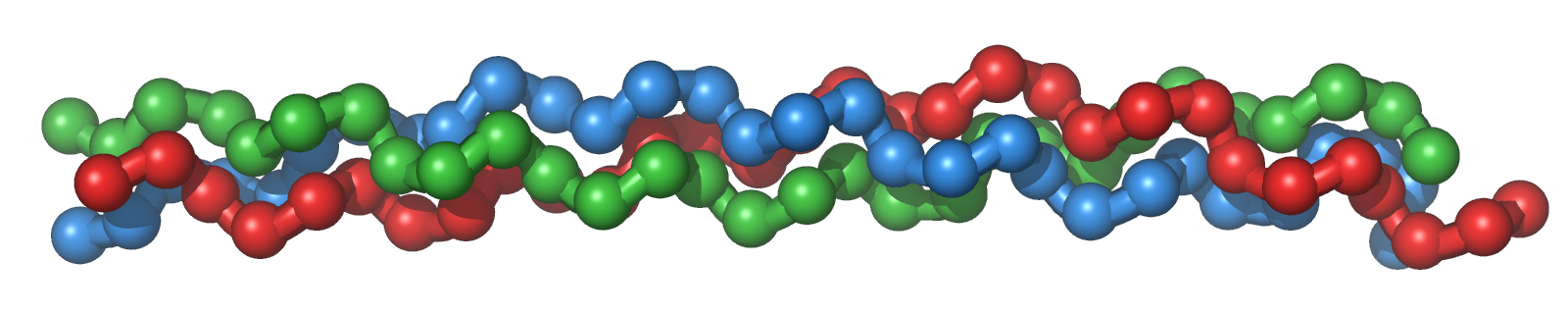
Tropocollagen triple helix

In molecular biology, fibrous proteins or scleroproteins are one of the three main classifications of protein structure (alongside globular and membrane proteins). Fibrous proteins are made up of elongated or fibrous polypeptide chains which form filamentous and sheet-like structures. This kind of protein can be distinguished from globular protein by its low solubility in water. In contrast, globular proteins are spherical and generally soluble in water, performing dynamic functions like enzymatic activity or transport. Such proteins serve protective and structural roles by forming connective tissue, tendons, bone matrices, and muscle fiber.

Fibrous proteins consist of many families including keratin, collagen, elastin, fibrin or spidroin. Collagen is the most abundant of these proteins which exists in vertebrate connective tissue including tendon, cartilage, and bone.

== Biomolecular structure ==
A fibrous protein is composed of long, repetitive chains of amino acids that are intertwined to form structures resembling rods or wires. These proteins are often insoluble in water, meaning they do not dissolve. This insolubility is due to the arrangement of their amino acids; many of the amino acids that are exposed on the surface of the protein are hydrophobic (water-repelling), which causes the proteins to clump together, or aggregate, in a watery environment.

A fibrous protein's peptide sequence often has limited residues with repeats; these can form unusual secondary structures, such as a collagen helix. The structures often feature cross-links between chains (e.g., cys-cys disulfide bonds between keratin chains).

Fibrous proteins tend not to denature as easily as globular proteins.

Miroshnikov et al. (1998) are among the researchers who have attempted to synthesize fibrous proteins.
