= Collagen, type XXI, alpha 1 =

Protein found in humans

COL21A1

Identifiers
- Aliases: COL21A1, collagen, type XXI, alpha 1, COLA1L, dJ682J15.1, dJ708F5.1, FP633, collagen type XXI alpha 1, collagen type XXI alpha 1 chain
- External IDs: OMIM: 610002; GeneCards: COL21A1

Gene location (Human)
Chr.	Chromosome 6 (human)
Band	6p12.1|6p12.3-p11.2	Start	56,056,590 bp
Band	6p12.1|6p12.3-p11.2	End	56,394,094 bp
RNA expression pattern
Bgee	Human / Mouse (ortholog); Top expressed in: bronchial epithelial cell; sural nerve; Descending thoracic aorta; ascending aorta; myocardium of left ventricle; right coronary artery; skin of hip; periodontal fiber; seminal vesicula; left coronary artery / n/a; More reference expression data
BioGPS	n/a
Gene ontology
Molecular function	extracellular matrix structural constituent conferring tensile strength
Cellular component	cytoplasm; extracellular matrix; extracellular region; collagen; endoplasmic reticulum lumen; cytosol; extracellular space; collagen-containing extracellular matrix
Biological process	growth plate cartilage chondrocyte morphogenesis
Sources:Amigo / QuickGO
Orthologs
Databases	NCBI: entry; OMA: entry
Species	Human	Mouse
Entrez	81578	n/a
Ensembl	ENSG00000124749	n/a
UniProt	Q96P44	n/a
RefSeq (mRNA)	NM_030820; NM_001318751; NM_001318752; NM_001318753; NM_001318754	n/a
RefSeq (protein)	NP_001305680; NP_001305681; NP_001305682; NP_001305683; NP_110447	n/a
Location (UCSC)	Chr 6: 56.06 – 56.39 Mb	n/a
PubMed search		n/a
- Wikidata
View/Edit Human

Collagen alpha-1(XXI) chain is a protein that in humans is encoded by the COL21A1 gene. It is the alpha chain of type XXI collagen, a collagen belonging to the FACIT collagen family (fibril-associated collagens with interrupted triple helices). Type XXI collagen is an extracellular matrix component that is found in tissues containing type I collagen and is linked to the assembly and maintenance of the extracellular matrix and is also a component of blood vessel walls, where it is secreted by smooth-muscle cells and may contribute to extracellular matrix assembly of the vascular network during blood vessel formation.

== Gene ==
In humans, COL21A1 is located on the short arm of chromosome 6 at band 6p12.3–p11.2. The gene spans approximately 337 kb of genomic DNA and contains 31 exons; its 5′-untranslated exons (exon 1 and exon 1a) are alternatively spliced, and alternative splicing of the gene gives rise to multiple transcript variants. The exon–domain organization of COL21A1 resembles that of other genes encoding FACIT collagens.

== Protein ==
The human collagen alpha-1(XXI) chain is a 957-amino acid protein. As a FACIT collagen, it has a domain organization consisting of an N-terminal signal peptide followed by a single von Willebrand factor A (VWA) domain, a thrombospondin N-terminal (TSPN) domain, and a collagen triple-helical region that is interrupted by short non-collagenous segments. This interrupted triple-helical structure is the defining feature of the FACIT subfamily, whose members associate with the surfaces of major fibril-forming collagens rather than forming fibrils on their own. The mature protein is secreted into the extracellular space and localizes to the extracellular matrix.

== Tissue distribution ==
COL21A1 is expressed in a broad range of tissues, including skin, trachea, testis, uterus, placenta, lymph node, stomach and the walls of blood vessels, generally overlapping the distribution of type I collagen. Among these, relative expression is highest in lymph node, jejunum, pancreas, stomach, trachea, testis, uterus and placenta; moderate levels are found in brain, colon, lung, prostate, spinal cord, salivary gland and vascular smooth-muscle cells; and expression is weak in heart, liver, kidney, bone marrow, spleen and thymus.

COL21A1 expression is developmentally regulated, being higher at fetal stages than in the corresponding adult tissues. In a comparison of matched human tissues, COL21A1 transcripts were approximately 2.7-, 22- and 30-fold more abundant in fetal brain, heart and liver, respectively, than in their adult counterparts, suggesting a role in developmental processes. In cultured aortic smooth-muscle cells, expression of COL21A1 is stimulated by platelet-derived growth factor (PDGF). Its presence in the walls of blood vessels, where it is produced by smooth-muscle cells, was noted in the original characterization of the gene.

Type XXI collagen is also expressed in human skin, where it is a low-abundance component of the dermal extracellular matrix, as detected by quantitative proteomics of healthy skin. In a time-resolved proteomic atlas of the developing skin dermis, type XXI collagen was among the fibril-associated collagens whose abundance declined progressively with age over the human lifespan.

== Clinical significance ==
A genetic association study of four large extended Malay families reported that a decrease in COL21A1 copy number (reduced gene dosage) co-segregated with nonsyndromic cleft lip and/or palate, identifying COL21A1 (together with TOX3) as a candidate susceptibility gene for the condition. This is a single primary study, and a causal role for COL21A1 in cleft lip/palate has not been established.
