= FACIT collagen =

FACIT collagen (Fibril Associated Collagens with Interrupted Triple helices) is a type of collagen and also a proteoglycan that have two or more triple-helical domains that connect to collagen fibrils and share protein domains with non-collagen matrix molecules. FACIT collagens derive their name from their association and interaction with fibrillar collagens. Unlike fibrillar collagens, which form long fibers.

== Overview ==
FACIT collagens have interruptions in their triple helical structure. They are involved in assembling fibrillar collagens and other ECM components. Interruptions in the triple helical structure of FACIT collagens occur due to the presence of non-triple helical domains within the collagen molecule. These collagens are typically found alongside fibrillar collagens in various tissues and organs. Fibril-associated collagens with interrupted triple helices (FACIT collagens) are a subset of collagens that contribute to the organization and stabilization of the extracellular matrix (ECM). These collagens are typically found alongside fibrillar collagens in various tissues and organs. These domains vary in length and composition and provide flexibility and additional binding sites for other components of the extracellular matrix. There are eight known types of FACIT collagens: collagens IX, XII, XIV, XVI, XIX, XXI, and XXII.

The general FACIT collagen structure contains short triple helical COL domains (COL1, COL2, COL3) interrupted by NC domains with an N-terminal NC domain facing toward the interfibrillar space. FACIT collagen is found in various tissue areas to modulate the surface properties of collagen fibrils and generate tissue-specific three-dimensional patterns in the extracellular matrix. For example, collagen XIV connects the fibrillar networks of the cartilage and skin, and XII is found in connective tissues, particularly at the tendons, ligaments, and periodontium. These collagen types can be directly or indirectly associated with fibrils at different affinities to modulate the frictional properties of fibril surfaces. In addition, collagen XIV association with a propeptide suggests FACIT function can extend to providing binding sites for fibril-modifying extracellular enzymes.

== Other types ==
Other collagen types such as Collagen XX, which are smaller in size are mostly expressed in the connective tissue such as cartilage, tendon, and cornea while Collagen XIX is found in the skin, muscle cells, and the hippocampus. There are also collagens that are expressed in the basement membrane zones, which are extracellular matrices composed of macromolecule networks, and collagen XXII is one example located in the myotendinous junctions in the skeletal and heart muscles.

COL22A1 is also included in this class.

== See also ==
- Triple helix
- Collagen helix
