= Collagen, type XVIII, alpha 1 =

Protein found in humans

COL18A1
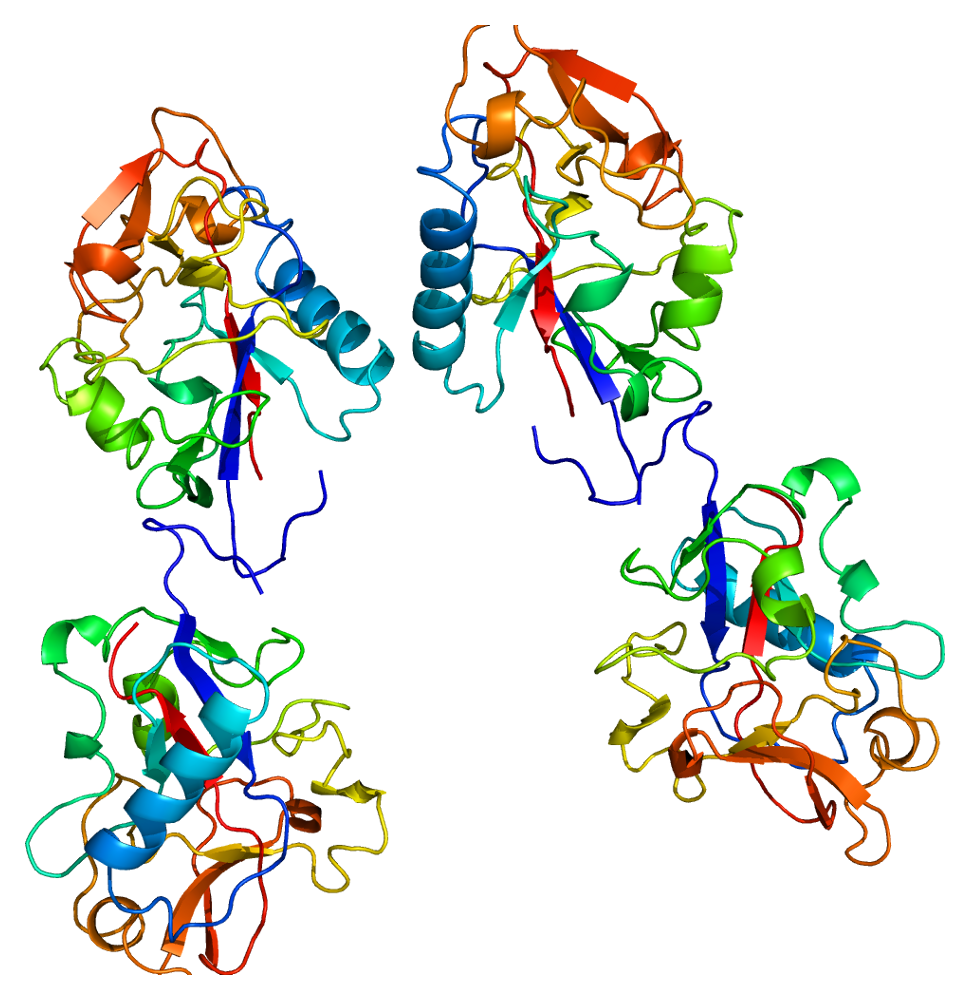

Identifiers
- Aliases: COL18A1, KNO, KNO1, KS, Collagen, type XVIII, alpha 1, collagen type XVIII alpha 1, collagen type XVIII alpha 1 chain, GLCC
- External IDs: OMIM: 120328; MGI: 88451; GeneCards: COL18A1
Available structures
| PDB | Ortholog search: PDBe RCSB |
| PDB | List of PDB id codes 1BNL, 3HON, 3HSH |

Gene location (Human)
| Chr. | Chromosome 21 (human) |
| Band | 21q22.3 | Start | 45,405,165 bp |
| Band | 21q22.3 | End | 45,513,720 bp |

Gene location (Mouse)
| Chr. | Chromosome 10 (mouse) |
| Band | 10 C1|10 39.72 cM | Start | 76,888,012 bp |
| Band | 10 C1|10 39.72 cM | End | 77,002,382 bp |
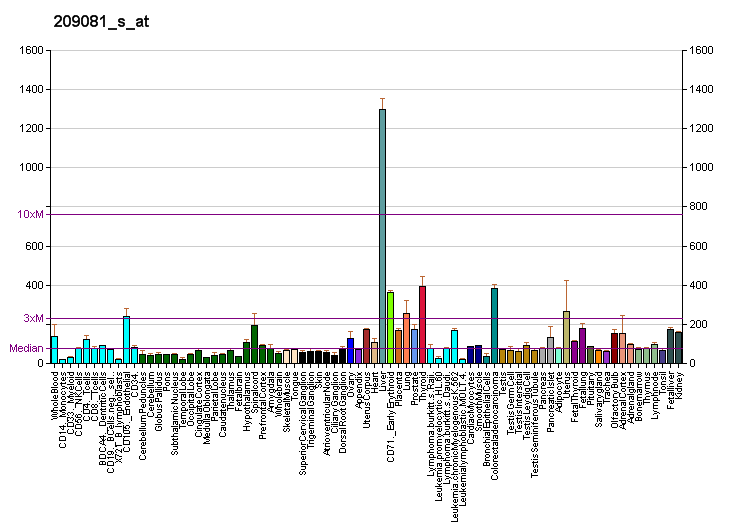

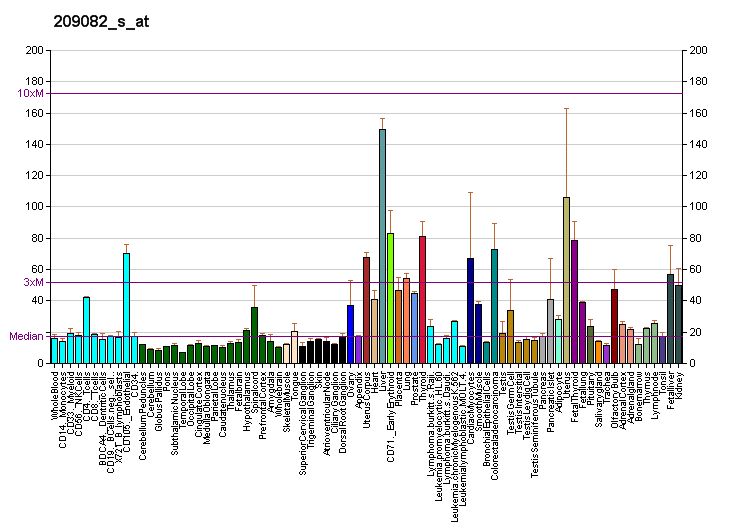
RNA expression pattern
| Bgee | Human / Mouse (ortholog); Top expressed in: right coronary artery; popliteal artery; tibial arteries; Descending thoracic aorta; right lobe of liver; ascending aorta; canal of the cervix; left ovary; right ovary; left coronary artery / Top expressed in: tunica media of zone of aorta; left lobe of liver; ascending aorta; Gonadal ridge; gallbladder; external carotid artery; internal carotid artery; ciliary body; medullary collecting duct; semi-lunar valve; More reference expression data |
| BioGPS | More reference expression data |
Gene ontology
| Molecular function | structural molecule activity; metal ion binding; protein binding; identical protein binding; extracellular matrix structural constituent; extracellular matrix structural constituent conferring tensile strength |
| Cellular component | collagen; endoplasmic reticulum lumen; extracellular matrix; basement membrane; extracellular exosome; extracellular space; extracellular region; collagen-containing extracellular matrix |
| Biological process | positive regulation of cell migration; endothelial cell morphogenesis; response to hydrostatic pressure; extracellular matrix organization; positive regulation of endothelial cell apoptotic process; cell adhesion; angiogenesis; positive regulation of cell population proliferation; animal organ morphogenesis; collagen catabolic process; visual perception; negative regulation of cell population proliferation |
Sources:Amigo / QuickGO
Orthologs
| Databases | NCBI: entry; OMA: entry |
| Species | Human | Mouse |
| Entrez | 80781 | 12822 |
| Ensembl | ENSG00000182871 | ENSMUSG00000001435 |
| UniProt | P39060 | P39061 |
| RefSeq (mRNA) | NM_130445; NM_030582; NM_130444; NM_001379500 | NM_001109991; NM_009929 |
| RefSeq (protein) | NP_085059; NP_569711; NP_569712; NP_001366429 | NP_001103461; NP_034059; NP_001393179; NP_001393180; NP_001393181 NP_001393182; NP_001393183; NP_001393184 |
| Location (UCSC) | Chr 21: 45.41 – 45.51 Mb | Chr 10: 76.89 – 77 Mb |
| PubMed search |
- Wikidata
| View/Edit Human | View/Edit Mouse |

Collagen alpha-1(XVIII) chain is a protein that in humans is encoded by the COL18A1 gene.

This gene encodes the alpha chain of type XVIII collagen. This collagen is one of the multiplexins, extracellular matrix proteins that contain multiple triple-helix domains (collagenous domains) interrupted by non-collagenous domains. The proteolytically produced C-terminal fragment of type XVIII collagen is endostatin, a potent antiangiogenic protein. Mutations in this gene are associated with Knobloch syndrome. The main features of this syndrome involve retinal abnormalities so type XVIII collagen may play an important role in retinal structure and in neural tube closure. Two transcript variants encoding different isoforms have been found for this gene.

== See also ==
- Collagen
