= KNO =

Kno or KNO may refer to:

- Kno, an American education software company
- Collagen, type XVIII, alpha 1, a protein
- Kno (musician) (Ryan Wisler), member of the hip hop trio CunninLynguists
- Knockhill Racing Circuit, Fife, Scotland
- Korea National Opera
- Commander of the Order of the Polar Star (Swedish: Kommendör av Nordstjärneorden)
- Kualanamu International Airport, an IATA code serving in Medan, Indonesia
