= Knobloch syndrome =

Medical condition characterised by eyesight problems

- Other names: Myopia retinal detachment encephalocele

Knobloch syndrome is a rare genetic disorder presenting severe eyesight problems and often a defect in the skull. It was named after the ophthalmologist William Hunter Knobloch (1926–2005), who first described the syndrome in 1971. A usual occurrence is a degeneration of the vitreous humour and the retina, two components of the eye. This breakdown often results in the separation of the retina (the light-sensitive tissue at the back of the eye) from the eye, called retinal detachment, which can be recurrent. Extreme myopia (near-sightedness) is a common feature. The limited evidence available from electroretinography suggests that a cone-rod pattern of dysfunction is also a feature.

Knobloch syndrome is caused by mutations in an autosomal recessive inherited gene. These mutations have been found in the COL18A1 gene that codes for a protein that builds collagen XVIII. This type of collagen is found in the basement membranes of various body tissues. Its deficiency in the eye is thought to be responsible for affecting normal eye development. There are two types of Knobloch syndrome with reports of a third type. When caused by mutations in the COL18A1 gene it is called Knobloch syndrome type 1. The genes causing types II and III have yet to be identified.

Knobloch syndrome is also characterised by cataracts, dislocated lens with skull defects such as occipital encephalocele and occipital aplasia. Encephalocele is a neural tube defect where the skull has not completely closed and sac-like protrusions of the brain can push through the skull; (it can also result from other causes). In Knobloch's syndrome this is usually seen in the occipital region, and aplasia is the underdevelopment of tissue again in this reference in the occipital area.
