= Collagen, type XXVIII, alpha 1 =

Protein found in humans

COL28A1

Identifiers
- Aliases: COL28A1, COL28, collagen type XXVIII alpha 1, collagen type XXVIII alpha 1 chain
- External IDs: OMIM: 609996; MGI: 2685312; GeneCards: COL28A1

Gene location (Human)
| Chr. | Chromosome 7 (human) |
| Band | 7p21.3 | Start | 7,356,203 bp |
| Band | 7p21.3 | End | 7,535,873 bp |

Gene location (Mouse)
| Chr. | Chromosome 6 (mouse) |
| Band | 6|6 A1 | Start | 7,997,808 bp |
| Band | 6|6 A1 | End | 8,192,617 bp |
RNA expression pattern
| Bgee | Human / Mouse (ortholog); Top expressed in: sural nerve; trigeminal ganglion; spinal ganglia; right uterine tube; bronchial epithelial cell; olfactory zone of nasal mucosa; epithelium of colon; parotid gland; muscle layer of sigmoid colon; anterior pituitary / Top expressed in: spermatocyte; spermatid; morula; zygote; esophagus; primary oocyte; quadriceps femoris muscle; lip; secondary oocyte; urinary bladder; More reference expression data |
| BioGPS | n/a |
Gene ontology
| Molecular function | peptidase inhibitor activity; serine-type endopeptidase inhibitor activity; extracellular matrix structural constituent; extracellular matrix structural constituent conferring tensile strength |
| Cellular component | extracellular region; basement membrane; collagen; endoplasmic reticulum lumen; extracellular matrix; extracellular space; collagen-containing extracellular matrix |
| Biological process | negative regulation of peptidase activity; cell adhesion; negative regulation of endopeptidase activity; extracellular matrix organization |
Sources:Amigo / QuickGO
Orthologs
| Databases | NCBI: entry; OMA: entry |
| Species | Human | Mouse |
| Entrez | 340267 | 213945 |
| Ensembl | ENSG00000215018 | ENSMUSG00000068794 |
| UniProt | Q2UY09 | Q2UY11 |
| RefSeq (mRNA) | NM_001037763 | NM_001037865 |
| RefSeq (protein) | NP_001032852 | NP_001032954 |
| Location (UCSC) | Chr 7: 7.36 – 7.54 Mb | Chr 6: 8 – 8.19 Mb |
| PubMed search |
- Wikidata
| View/Edit Human | View/Edit Mouse |

Collagen, type XXVIII, alpha 1 also known as COL28A1 is a protein that in humans is encoded by the COL28A1 gene. This protein belongs to a class of collagens that contain von Willebrand factor type A domains. The protein is encoded by the COL28A1 gene which contains 45 exons and is found of the p arm of chromosome 7.
