= Collagen, type V, alpha 3 =

Protein found in humans

COL5A3

Identifiers
- Aliases: COL5A3, collagen type V alpha 3 chain
- External IDs: OMIM: 120216; MGI: 1858212; GeneCards: COL5A3

Gene location (Human)
Chr.	Chromosome 19 (human)
Band	19p13.2	Start	9,959,561 bp
Band	19p13.2	End	10,010,504 bp

Gene location (Mouse)
Chr.	Chromosome 9 (mouse)
Band	9|9 A3	Start	20,681,346 bp
Band	9|9 A3	End	20,726,363 bp
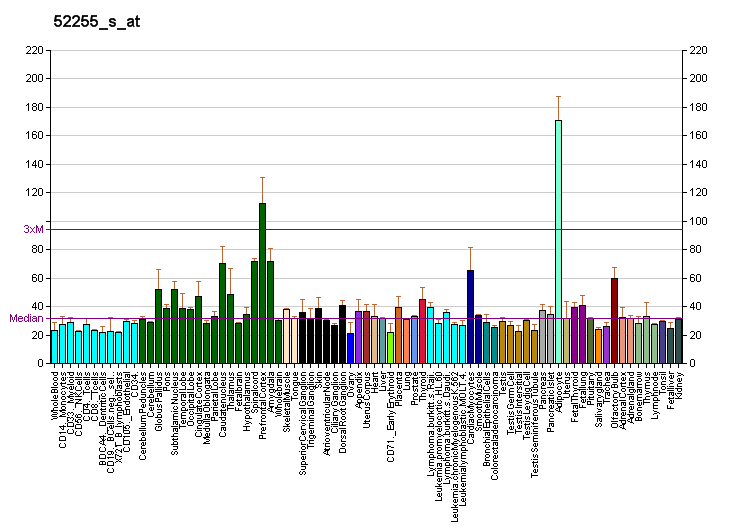

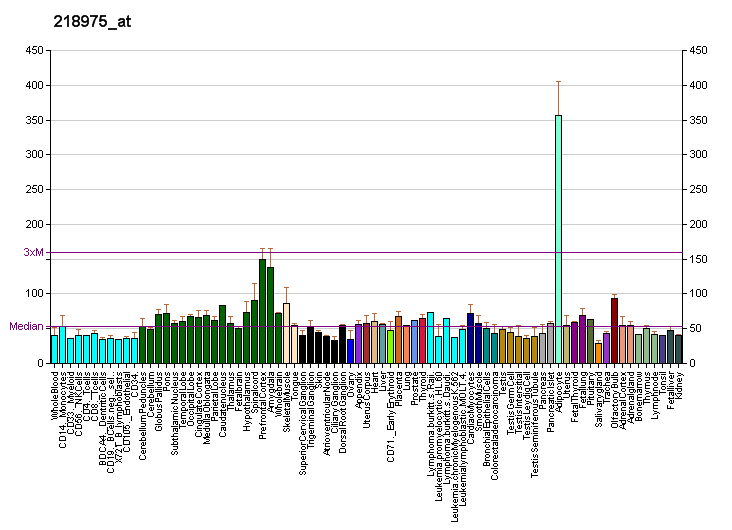
RNA expression pattern
Bgee	Human / Mouse (ortholog); Top expressed in: sural nerve; apex of heart; canal of the cervix; subcutaneous adipose tissue; left uterine tube; putamen; ectocervix; amygdala; right frontal lobe; dorsal motor nucleus of vagus nerve / Top expressed in: sciatic nerve; white adipose tissue; ankle; subcutaneous adipose tissue; umbilical cord; lumbar spinal ganglion; trachea; soleus muscle; vastus lateralis muscle; brown adipose tissue; More reference expression data
BioGPS	More reference expression data
Gene ontology
Molecular function	heparin binding; extracellular matrix structural constituent; collagen binding; extracellular matrix structural constituent conferring tensile strength; proteoglycan binding
Cellular component	collagen type V trimer; extracellular region; collagen; endoplasmic reticulum lumen; extracellular matrix; extracellular space; collagen-containing extracellular matrix
Biological process	collagen catabolic process; cell-matrix adhesion; extracellular matrix organization; skin development; collagen fibril organization; cell adhesion
Sources:Amigo / QuickGO
Orthologs
Databases	NCBI: entry; OMA: entry
Species	Human	Mouse
Entrez	50509	53867
Ensembl	ENSG00000080573	ENSMUSG00000004098
UniProt	P25940	Q9JLI2
RefSeq (mRNA)	NM_015719	NM_016919; NM_001317388
RefSeq (protein)	NP_056534	NP_001304317; NP_058615
Location (UCSC)	Chr 19: 9.96 – 10.01 Mb	Chr 9: 20.68 – 20.73 Mb
PubMed search
- Wikidata
View/Edit Human	View/Edit Mouse

Collagen alpha-3(V) chain is a protein that in humans is encoded by the COL5A3 gene.

This gene encodes an alpha chain for one of the low abundance fibrillar collagens. Fibrillar collagen molecules are trimers that can be composed of one or more types of alpha chains. Type V collagen is found in tissues containing type I collagen and appears to regulate the assembly of heterotypic fibers composed of both type I and type V collagen. This gene product is closely related to type XI collagen and it is possible that the collagen chains of types V and XI constitute a single collagen type with tissue-specific chain combinations. Mutations in this gene are thought to be responsible for the symptoms of a subset of patients with Ehlers–Danlos syndrome type III. Messages of several sizes can be detected in northern blots but sequence information cannot confirm the identity of the shorter messages.
