= Multiplexin =

Family of collagens

Multiplexin is a family of collagens.
