= Collagen, type XIX, alpha 1 =

Protein found in humans

COL19A1

Identifiers
- Aliases: COL19A1, COL9A1L, D6S228E, collagen type XIX alpha 1, collagen type XIX alpha 1 chain
- External IDs: OMIM: 120165; MGI: 1095415; GeneCards: COL19A1

Gene location (Human)
Chr.	Chromosome 6 (human)
Band	6q13	Start	69,866,556 bp
Band	6q13	End	70,212,468 bp

Gene location (Mouse)
Chr.	Chromosome 1 (mouse)
Band	1|1 A5	Start	24,300,971 bp
Band	1|1 A5	End	24,626,553 bp
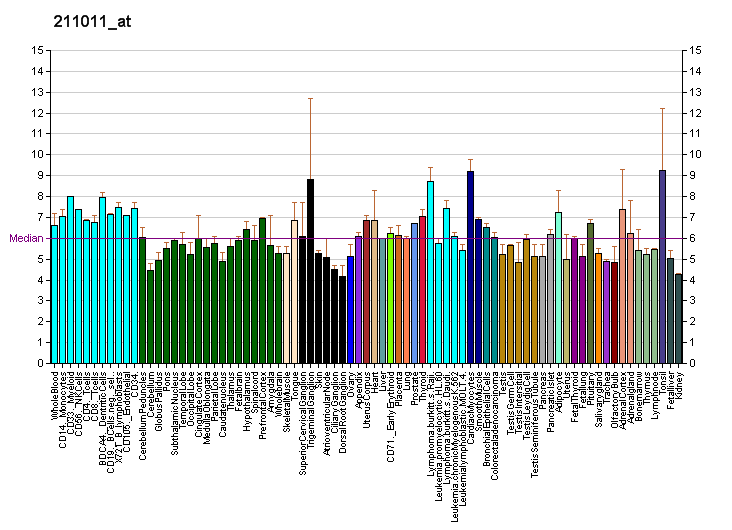
RNA expression pattern
Bgee	Human / Mouse (ortholog); Top expressed in: testicle; gonad; gastric mucosa; endothelial cell; epithelium of nasopharynx; cerebellar vermis; right hemisphere of cerebellum; cartilage tissue; tibialis anterior muscle; lymph node / Top expressed in: facial skeleton; primary motor cortex; rib; tunica media of zone of aorta; Dermatocranium; mammillary body; lateral part of occipital bone; CA3 field; perirhinal cortex; membranous bone; More reference expression data
BioGPS	More reference expression data
Gene ontology
Molecular function	protein-macromolecule adaptor activity; extracellular matrix structural constituent; extracellular matrix structural constituent conferring tensile strength
Cellular component	endoplasmic reticulum lumen; collagen; extracellular region; extracellular matrix; extracellular space; collagen-containing extracellular matrix
Biological process	collagen catabolic process; multicellular organism development; skeletal system development; cell differentiation; muscle organ development; skeletal muscle tissue development; extracellular matrix organization; cell adhesion; cell-cell adhesion
Sources:Amigo / QuickGO
Orthologs
Databases	NCBI: entry; OMA: entry
Species	Human	Mouse
Entrez	1310	12823
Ensembl	ENSG00000082293	ENSMUSG00000026141
UniProt	Q14993	Q0VF58
RefSeq (mRNA)	NM_001858	NM_007733
RefSeq (protein)	NP_001849	NP_031759
Location (UCSC)	Chr 6: 69.87 – 70.21 Mb	Chr 1: 24.3 – 24.63 Mb
PubMed search
- Wikidata
View/Edit Human	View/Edit Mouse

Collagen alpha-1(XIX) chain is a protein that in humans is encoded by the COL19A1 gene.

This gene encodes the alpha chain of type XIX collagen, a member of the FACIT collagen family (fibril-associated collagens with interrupted helices). Although the function of this collagen is not known, other members of this collagen family are found in association with fibril-forming collagens such as type I and II, and serve to maintain the integrity of the extracellular matrix. The transcript produced from this gene has an unusually large 3' UTR which has not been completely sequenced.
