= Collagen, type XVI, alpha 1 =

Protein found in humans

COL16A1

Identifiers
- Aliases: COL16A1, 447AA, FP1572, collagen type XVI alpha 1, collagen type XVI alpha 1 chain
- External IDs: OMIM: 120326; MGI: 1095396; GeneCards: COL16A1

Gene location (Human)
Chr.	Chromosome 1 (human)
Band	1p35.2	Start	31,652,263 bp
Band	1p35.2	End	31,704,319 bp

Gene location (Mouse)
Chr.	Chromosome 4 (mouse)
Band	4|4 D2.2	Start	129,941,633 bp
Band	4|4 D2.2	End	129,993,076 bp
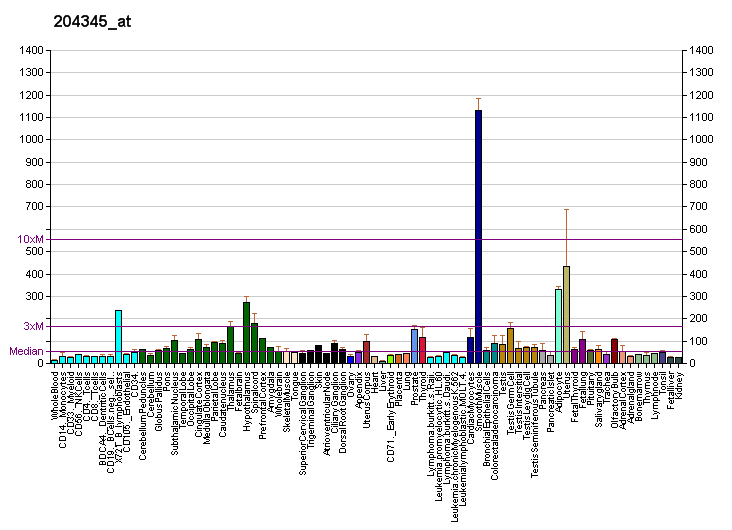

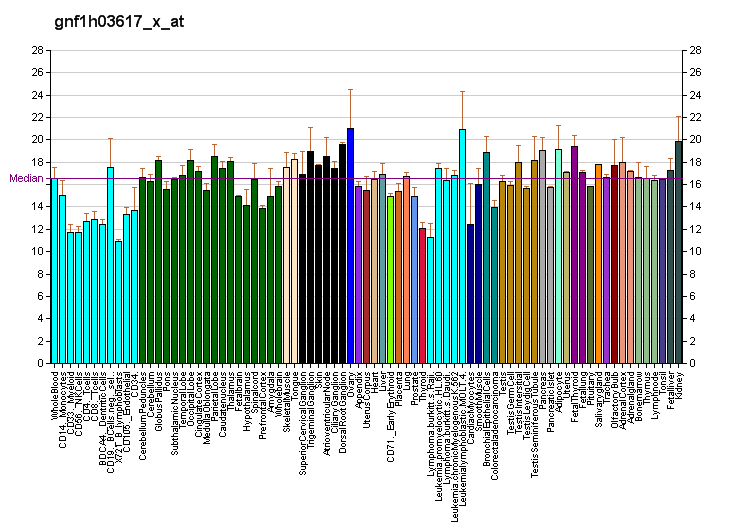

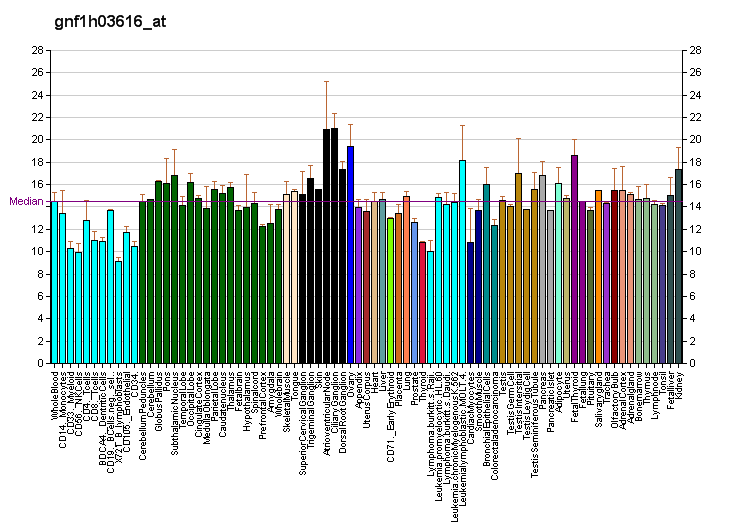
RNA expression pattern
Bgee	Human / Mouse (ortholog); Top expressed in: tibia; cartilage tissue; left ovary; canal of the cervix; sural nerve; C1 segment; right ovary; right coronary artery; body of uterus; periodontal fiber / Top expressed in: body of femur; umbilical cord; calvaria; vas deferens; seminiferous tubule; uterus; lip; spermatocyte; efferent ductule; dermis; More reference expression data
BioGPS	More reference expression data
Gene ontology
Molecular function	integrin binding; protein binding; extracellular matrix structural constituent; extracellular matrix structural constituent conferring tensile strength
Cellular component	extracellular region; collagen type XVI trimer; collagen; endoplasmic reticulum lumen; extracellular matrix; extracellular space; collagen-containing extracellular matrix
Biological process	cellular response to amino acid stimulus; integrin-mediated signaling pathway; female pregnancy; positive regulation of focal adhesion assembly; integrin activation; cell adhesion; extracellular matrix organization; cell adhesion mediated by integrin
Sources:Amigo / QuickGO
Orthologs
Databases	NCBI: entry; OMA: entry
Species	Human	Mouse
Entrez	1307	107581
Ensembl	ENSG00000084636	ENSMUSG00000040690
UniProt	Q07092	Q8BLX7
RefSeq (mRNA)	NM_001856	NM_028266
RefSeq (protein)	NP_001847	NP_082542; NP_001391281; NP_001391282
Location (UCSC)	Chr 1: 31.65 – 31.7 Mb	Chr 4: 129.94 – 129.99 Mb
PubMed search
- Wikidata
View/Edit Human	View/Edit Mouse

Collagen alpha-1(XVI) chain is a protein that in humans is encoded by the COL16A1 gene.

== Function ==
This gene encodes the alpha chain of type XVI collagen, a member of the FACIT collagen family (fibril-associated collagens with interrupted helices). Members of this collagen family are found in association with fibril-forming collagens such as type I and II, and serve to maintain the integrity of the extracellular matrix. High levels of type XVI collagen have been found in fibroblasts and keratinocytes, and in smooth muscle and amnion.
