= COL24A1 =

Protein-coding gene in humans

Identifiers
- Aliases: COL24A1, collagen, type XXIV, alpha 1
- External IDs: OMIM: 610025; MGI: 1918605; GeneCards: COL24A1

Gene location (Mouse)
Chr.	Chromosome 3 (mouse)
Band	3|3 H2	Start	144,998,233 bp
Band	3|3 H2	End	145,257,766 bp
Gene ontology
Molecular function	extracellular matrix structural constituent; protein binding; extracellular matrix structural constituent conferring tensile strength
Cellular component	extracellular region; collagen; endoplasmic reticulum lumen; extracellular space; extracellular matrix; collagen-containing extracellular matrix
Biological process	hematopoietic progenitor cell differentiation; extracellular matrix organization
Sources:Amigo / QuickGO
Orthologs
Databases	NCBI: entry; OMA: entry
Species	Human	Mouse
Entrez	255631	71355
Ensembl	ENSG00000171502	ENSMUSG00000028197
UniProt	Q17RW2	Q30D77
RefSeq (mRNA)	NM_152890	NM_027770; NM_001317733
RefSeq (protein)	NP_690850; NP_001336884	NP_001304662; NP_082046
Location (UCSC)	n/a	Chr 3: 145 – 145.26 Mb
PubMed search
- Wikidata
View/Edit Human	View/Edit Mouse

Collagen, type XXIV, alpha 1 is a protein that in humans is encoded by the COL24A1 gene.
