= Collagen, type XX, alpha 1 =

Protein-coding gene in the species Homo sapiens

COL20A1

Identifiers
- Aliases: COL20A1, bA261N11.4, collagen type XX alpha 1, collagen type XX alpha 1 chain
- External IDs: MGI: 1920618; GeneCards: COL20A1
Available structures
PDB	Ortholog search: PDBe RCSB
PDB	List of PDB id codes 2DKM, 2EE3, 2EKJ, 5KF4

Gene location (Human)
Chr.	Chromosome 20 (human)
Band	20q13.33	Start	63,293,186 bp
Band	20q13.33	End	63,334,851 bp

Gene location (Mouse)
Chr.	Chromosome 2 (mouse)
Band	2|2 H4	Start	180,628,328 bp
Band	2|2 H4	End	180,660,156 bp
RNA expression pattern
Bgee	Human / Mouse (ortholog); Top expressed in: right testis; left testis; cingulate gyrus; anterior cingulate cortex; right frontal lobe; amygdala; Brodmann area 9; endothelial cell; nucleus accumbens; C1 segment / Top expressed in: seminiferous tubule; external carotid artery; internal carotid artery; sphenoid bone; neural layer of retina; ankle; lesser wing of sphenoid bone; extraocular muscle; lumbar subsegment of spinal cord; granulocyte; More reference expression data
BioGPS	n/a
Gene ontology
Molecular function	protein binding; calcium ion binding; mannose binding
Cellular component	extracellular matrix; extracellular region; collagen; endoplasmic reticulum lumen; extracellular space; collagen-containing extracellular matrix
Biological process	complement activation, lectin pathway; growth plate cartilage chondrocyte morphogenesis
Sources:Amigo / QuickGO
Orthologs
Databases	NCBI: entry; OMA: entry
Species	Human	Mouse
Entrez	57642	73368
Ensembl	ENSG00000101203	ENSMUSG00000016356
UniProt	Q9P218	Q923P0
RefSeq (mRNA)	NM_020882	NM_028518
RefSeq (protein)	NP_065933	NP_082794
Location (UCSC)	Chr 20: 63.29 – 63.33 Mb	Chr 2: 180.63 – 180.66 Mb
PubMed search
- Wikidata
View/Edit Human	View/Edit Mouse

collagen, type XX, alpha 1

Identifiers
- Symbol: COL20A1
- NCBI gene: 57642
- HGNC: 14670
- RefSeq: NM_020882

Other data
- Locus: Chr. 20 q13.33

COL20A1 is a collagen gene.
