= Collagen, type XV, alpha 1 =

Protein found in humans

COL15A1

Identifiers
- Aliases: COL15A1, collagen type XV alpha 1 chain
- External IDs: OMIM: 120325; MGI: 88449; GeneCards: COL15A1
Available structures
PDB	Ortholog search: PDBe RCSB
PDB	List of PDB id codes 3N3F

Gene location (Human)
Chr.	Chromosome 9 (human)
Band	9q22.33	Start	98,943,179 bp
Band	9q22.33	End	99,070,792 bp

Gene location (Mouse)
Chr.	Chromosome 4 (mouse)
Band	4|4 B1	Start	47,208,161 bp
Band	4|4 B1	End	47,313,167 bp
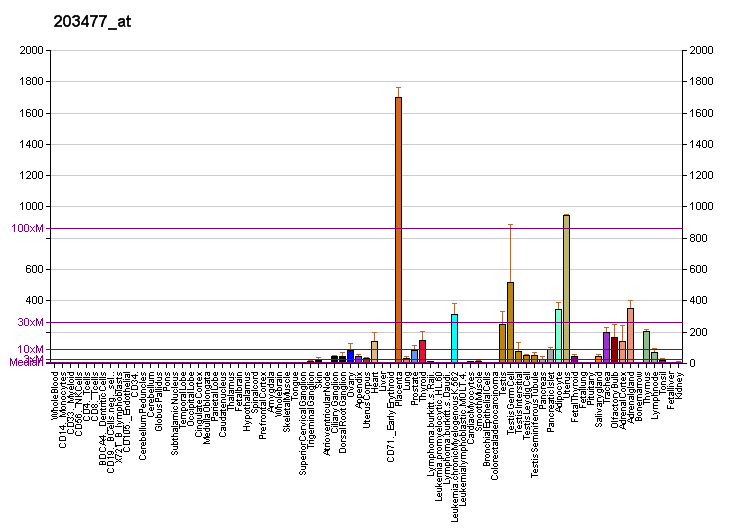
RNA expression pattern
Bgee	Human / Mouse (ortholog); Top expressed in: skin of hip; placenta; synovial joint; cardia; cartilage tissue; right ventricle; pericardium; superficial temporal artery; saphenous vein; cardiac muscle tissue of right atrium / Top expressed in: ascending aorta; aortic valve; lactiferous gland; cardiac muscle tissue of left ventricle; sciatic nerve; white adipose tissue; extraocular muscle; uterus; subcutaneous adipose tissue; thoracic diaphragm; More reference expression data
BioGPS	More reference expression data
Gene ontology
Molecular function	extracellular matrix structural constituent; structural molecule activity; extracellular matrix structural constituent conferring tensile strength
Cellular component	integral component of membrane; basement membrane; collagen; endoplasmic reticulum lumen; extracellular exosome; collagen type XV trimer; extracellular region; extracellular matrix; extracellular space; collagen-containing extracellular matrix
Biological process	collagen catabolic process; multicellular organism development; cell differentiation; angiogenesis; signal transduction; cell adhesion; extracellular matrix organization
Sources:Amigo / QuickGO
Orthologs
Databases	NCBI: entry; OMA: entry
Species	Human	Mouse
Entrez	1306	12819
Ensembl	ENSG00000204291	ENSMUSG00000028339
UniProt	P39059	O35206
RefSeq (mRNA)	NM_001855	NM_009928
RefSeq (protein)	NP_001846	NP_034058
Location (UCSC)	Chr 9: 98.94 – 99.07 Mb	Chr 4: 47.21 – 47.31 Mb
PubMed search
- Wikidata
View/Edit Human	View/Edit Mouse

Collagen alpha-1(XV) chain is a protein that in humans is encoded by the COL15A1 gene.

This gene encodes the alpha chain of type XV collagen, a member of the FACIT collagen family (fibril-associated collagens with interrupted helices). Type XV collagen has a wide tissue distribution but the strongest expression is localized to basement membrane zones so it may function to adhere basement membranes to underlying connective tissue stroma. Mouse studies have shown that collagen XV deficiency is associated with muscle and microvessel deterioration.

Type XV collagen is known to be a tumor suppressor that can be used to understand tumor cells environment. Type XV collagen provides the membrane with support and cell anchorage but does not typically have a tight structural network.

Changes of collagen XV can be known to lead to cancer-like behavior in tissues. The loss of collagen XV would no longer provide structural support for the membrane, which can cause tumor cells to invade the basement membrane; prompting possible metastasis. The over expression of collagen XV is known to be found in cervical cancer.

For possible future medical purposes the lack of collagen XV present in tissues can be a means for indication of an invasive tumor.
