= Type I collagen =

Type of connective tissue in animals

collagen, type I, alpha 1

Identifiers
- Symbol: COL1A1
- NCBI gene: 1277
- HGNC: 2197
- OMIM: 120150
- RefSeq: NM_000088
- UniProt: P02452

Other data
- Locus: Chr. 17 q21.3-q22
Search for
- Structures: Swiss-model
- Domains: InterPro

collagen, type I, alpha 2

Identifiers
- Symbol: COL1A2
- Alt. symbols: OI4
- NCBI gene: 1278
- HGNC: 2198
- OMIM: 120160
- RefSeq: NM_000089
- UniProt: P08123

Other data
- Locus: Chr. 7 q21.3-22.1
Search for
- Structures: Swiss-model
- Domains: InterPro

Type I collagen is the most abundant collagen of the human body, consisting of around 90% of the body's total collagen in vertebrates. Due to this, it is also the most abundant protein type found in all vertebrates. Type I forms large, eosinophilic fibers known as collagen fibers, which make up most of the rope-like dense connective tissue in the body.

Collagen I itself is created by the combination of both a proalpha1 and a proalpha2 chain created by the COL1alpha1 and COL1alpha2 genes respectively. The Col I gene itself takes up a triple-helical conformation due to its repeating Glycine-X-Y motif, x and y being any type of amino acid. Depending on whether the triple-helix is made from the same kind of chain, the result is a homotrimer (same) or a heterotrimer (different),, both of which can be found during different periods of development. Heterotrimers, in particular, play an important role in wound healing, and are the dominant form found in the body.

Type I collagen can be found in a myriad of different places in the body, mainly forming the matrix of connective tissues. It is present in scar tissue as well as tendons, ligaments, the endomysium of myofibrils, the organic part of bone, the dermis, the dentin, and organ capsules.

== Formation ==
The creation process of type I collagen begins with the production and the combination of two separate subunits, called the pro-alpha1(I) and pro-alpha2(I) chains. These pro-alpha chains are encoded by the COL1A1 and COL1A2 genes respectively.

Each chain is produced by the ribosome within the cell's endoplasmic reticulum (ER) using a mRNA. The chains combine into the triple-helical procollagen. Each chain has additional parts present on either side of the molecule (N and C terminals) to prevent the triple helices from coiling together prematurely. It also has many regular proline residues that need to be converted to hydroxyproline by prolyl 4-hydroxylase in the ER. This procollagen is transported to the cell membrane and deposited outside of the cell. There, procollagen peptidases shear off the protective caps, exposing the triple-helix that can finally coil together.

The triple helix is then strengthened by molecular cross-links formed by lysyl oxidase.

== Structure ==
Type I collagen has a triple-helical form which is caused by its amino acid composition. Its specific domain follows an order of G-X-Y In which the X and Y slots are occupied by any amino acid other than glycine however these slots are typically occupied by both hydroxyproline and proline, not in any particular order. This specific conformation will end up being repeated and packed into a hexagonal structure in order to form collagen fibrils.

The molecular mass of type I collagen is 300,000 g/mol and assembles in one of two higher order molecular assemblies. It forms a large solid structure formed by strict and non-flexible protein interactions. This large multi-protein structure is crucially held together by mainly hydrogen bonds and the fibrils conform to a typical diameter size between 25 and 400 nanometers in this fibril conformation.

== Clinical significance ==
Markers used to measure bone loss are not easily testable. Degradation of type I collagen releases metabolites that can be used to monitor resorption.

Mutations in genes encoding collagen type 1 are known to cause a myriad of different conditions including:

=== Cardiac valvular type Ehlers-Danlos syndrome ===
This type of Ehlers-Danlos is caused by mutations within the COL1alpha2 gene, which is responsible for encoding the collagen pro-alpha2 chain.

=== Vascular type Ehlers-Danlos syndrome ===
Some patients with Vascular type Ehlers-Danlos, which is caused by mutations in COL3alpha1, are known to also have mutations in the COL1alpha1 gene. However the exact associations remain unknown.

=== Arthrochalasia type Ehlers-Danlos syndrome ===
This type of Ehlers-Danlos is caused by the mutation of the COL1alpha1 and COL1alpha2 genes, which are responsible for encoding the proalpha1 and proalpha2 chains respectively.

=== Osteogenesis imperfecta (types 1–4) ===
Mutations in COL1alpha 1 and/or COL1alpha2 are known to cause several different types of osteogenesis imperfecta with the severity of said diseases being related to the type and frequency of the mutations occurring. For further information on COL1's effect in this disease, see Collagen, type 1, alpha 1.

=== Caffey disease ===
This condition is caused by a mutation in the COL1alpha gene that replaces arginine with cysteine at the 836 protein site. This particular mutation causes the fibrils of type I to vary greatly in size and shape.

== See also ==
- Type II collagen
- Collagen, type I, alpha 1
- Collagen, type I, alpha 2
- Collagen, type III, alpha 1
