= Collagen, type XIV, alpha 1 =

Protein found in humans

COL14A1

Identifiers
- Aliases: COL14A1, UND, Collagen, type XIV, alpha 1, collagen type XIV alpha 1, collagen type XIV alpha 1 chain
- External IDs: OMIM: 120324; MGI: 1341272; GeneCards: COL14A1

Gene location (Human)
Chr.	Chromosome 8 (human)
Band	8q24.12	Start	120,059,780 bp
Band	8q24.12	End	120,373,573 bp

Gene location (Mouse)
Chr.	Chromosome 15 (mouse)
Band	15|15 D1	Start	55,171,146 bp
Band	15|15 D1	End	55,384,199 bp
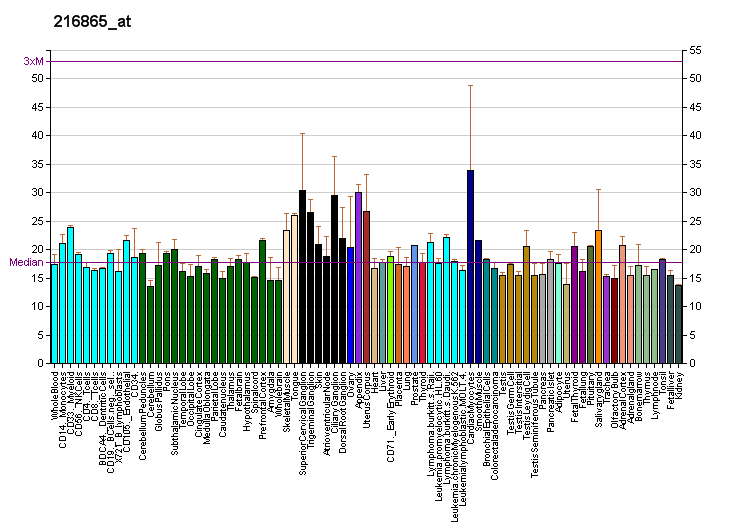

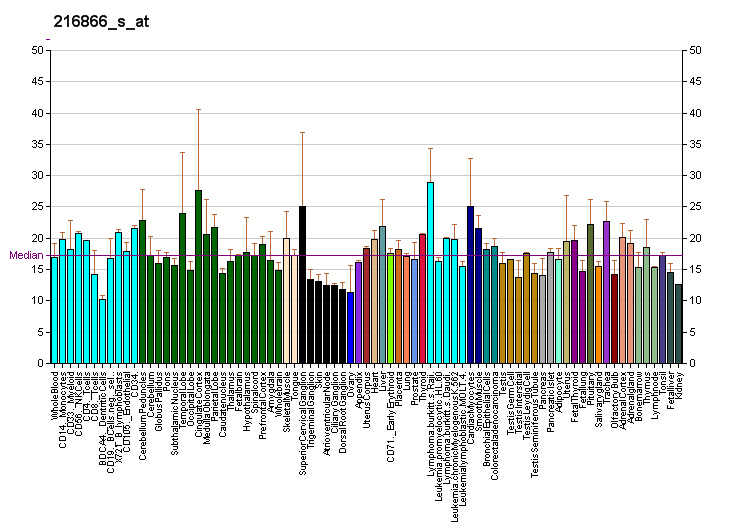

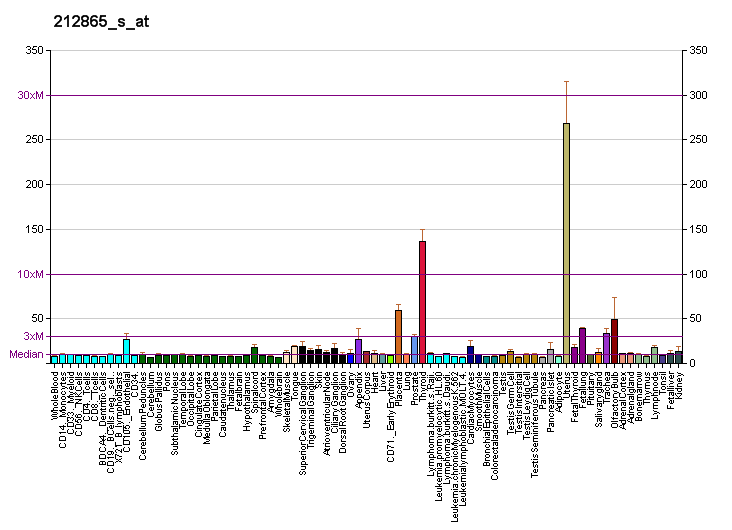
RNA expression pattern
Bgee	Human / Mouse (ortholog); Top expressed in: Descending thoracic aorta; right coronary artery; popliteal artery; tibial arteries; cartilage tissue; ascending aorta; gallbladder; left coronary artery; saphenous vein; Achilles tendon / Top expressed in: efferent ductule; vas deferens; conjunctival fornix; dermis; human fetus; migratory enteric neural crest cell; semi-lunar valve; aortic valve; vestibular sensory epithelium; ascending aorta; More reference expression data
BioGPS	More reference expression data
Gene ontology
Molecular function	protein-macromolecule adaptor activity; extracellular matrix structural constituent; collagen binding; RNA binding; extracellular matrix structural constituent conferring tensile strength
Cellular component	extracellular matrix; collagen; endoplasmic reticulum lumen; extracellular exosome; collagen type XIV trimer; extracellular space; extracellular region; collagen-containing extracellular matrix
Biological process	cell adhesion; collagen fibril organization; extracellular matrix organization; cell-cell adhesion; growth plate cartilage chondrocyte morphogenesis
Sources:Amigo / QuickGO
Orthologs
Databases	NCBI: entry; OMA: entry
Species	Human	Mouse
Entrez	7373	12818
Ensembl	ENSG00000187955	ENSMUSG00000022371
UniProt	Q05707	Q80X19
RefSeq (mRNA)	NM_021110; NM_001384947	NM_181277; NM_001368422
RefSeq (protein)	NP_066933	NP_851794; NP_001355351
Location (UCSC)	Chr 8: 120.06 – 120.37 Mb	Chr 15: 55.17 – 55.38 Mb
PubMed search
- Wikidata
View/Edit Human	View/Edit Mouse

Collagen alpha-1(XIV) chain is a protein that in humans is encoded by the COL14A1 gene. It likely plays a role in collagen binding and cell-cell adhesion.
