= Procollagen peptidase =

Class of enzymes

procollagen (type III) N-endopeptidase

Identifiers
- Symbol: PCOLN3
- Alt. symbols: PRSM1
- NCBI gene: 5119
- HGNC: 8740
- OMIM: 164010
- RefSeq: NM_002768
- UniProt: Q9HD42

Other data
- EC number: 3.4.24.14
- Locus: Chr. 16 q24.3
Search for
- Structures: Swiss-model
- Domains: InterPro

Procollagen peptidase (EC 3.4.24.14, procollagen N-terminal peptidase, procollagen aminopeptidase, aminoprocollagen peptidase, aminoterminal procollagen peptidase, procollagen aminoterminal protease, procollagen N-terminal proteinase, type I/II procollagen N-proteinase, type III procollagen) is an endopeptidase involved in the processing of collagen. The proteases removes the terminal peptides of the procollagen. Deficiency of these enzymes leads to dermatosparaxis or Ehlers–Danlos syndrome.

The enzyme is present in the skin of rats and humans.
