= EMID2 =

Mammalian protein found in Homo sapiens

COL26A1

Identifiers
- Aliases: COL26A1, EMI6, EMID2, EMU2, SH2B, collagen type XXVI alpha 1, collagen type XXVI alpha 1 chain
- External IDs: OMIM: 608927; MGI: 2155345; GeneCards: COL26A1
Available structures
| PDB | Ortholog search: PDBe RCSB |
| PDB | List of PDB id codes 4AU2, 4AU3, 4BJ3 |

Gene location (Human)
| Chr. | Chromosome 7 (human) |
| Band | 7q22.1 | Start | 101,362,875 bp |
| Band | 7q22.1 | End | 101,559,024 bp |

Gene location (Mouse)
| Chr. | Chromosome 5 (mouse) |
| Band | 5|5 G2 | Start | 136,770,613 bp |
| Band | 5|5 G2 | End | 136,912,063 bp |
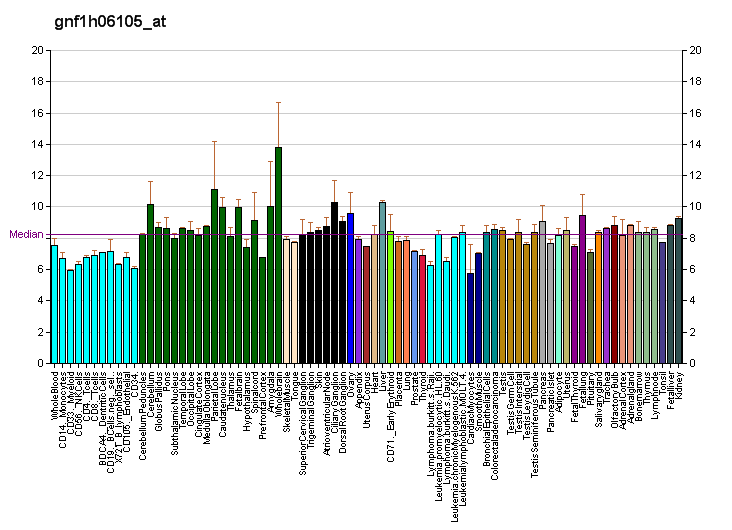

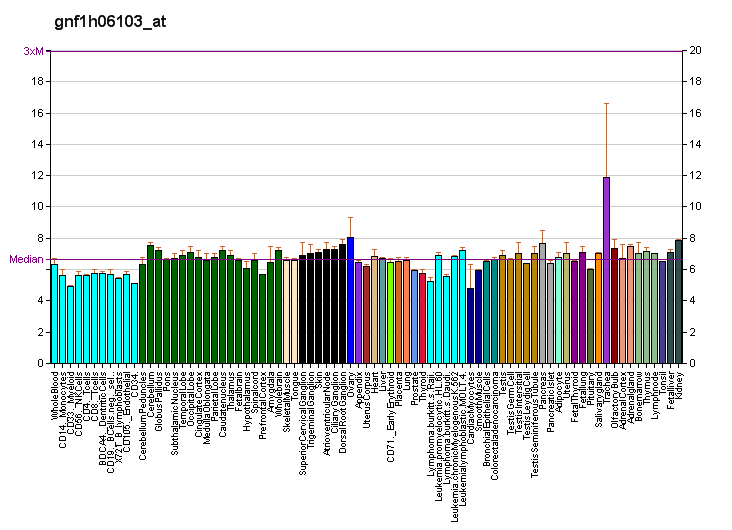

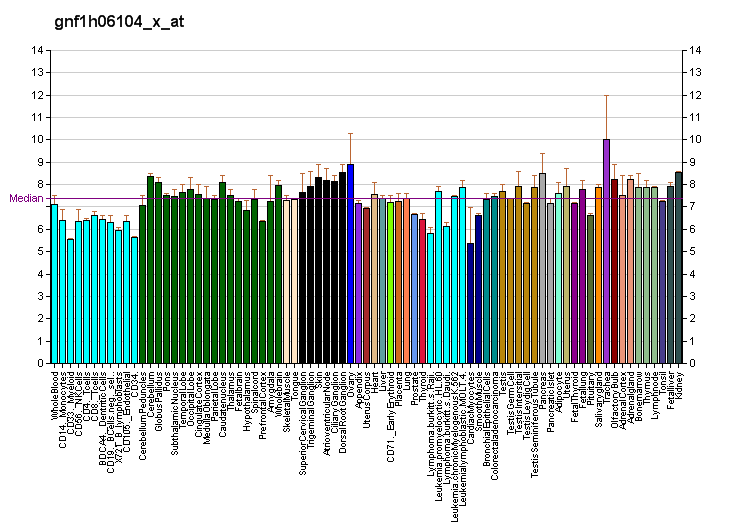
RNA expression pattern
| Bgee | Human / Mouse (ortholog); Top expressed in: vena cava; right frontal lobe; body of tongue; prefrontal cortex; Skeletal muscle tissue of rectus abdominis; right ventricle; pylorus; Brodmann area 9; cardia; mucosa of pharynx / Top expressed in: dermis; vas deferens; external carotid artery; maxillary prominence; otic vesicle; internal carotid artery; genital tubercle; mandibular prominence; saccule; human fetus; More reference expression data |
| BioGPS | More reference expression data |
Orthologs
| Databases | NCBI: entry; OMA: entry |
| Species | Human | Mouse |
| Entrez | 136227 | 140709 |
| Ensembl | ENSG00000160963 | ENSMUSG00000004415 |
| UniProt | Q96A83 | Q91VF6 |
| RefSeq (mRNA) | NM_133457; NM_001278563 | NM_024474; NM_001346699 |
| RefSeq (protein) | NP_001265492; NP_597714 | NP_001333628; NP_077794 |
| Location (UCSC) | Chr 7: 101.36 – 101.56 Mb | Chr 5: 136.77 – 136.91 Mb |
| PubMed search |
- Wikidata
| View/Edit Human | View/Edit Mouse |

Collagen alpha-1(XXVI) chain is a protein that in humans is encoded by the EMID2 gene.
