= Collagen, type XXII, alpha 1 =

Protein found in humans

COL22A1

Identifiers
- Aliases: COL22A1, collagen, type XXII, alpha 1, collagen type XXII alpha 1 chain
- External IDs: OMIM: 610026; MGI: 1916950; GeneCards: COL22A1

Gene location (Mouse)
Chr.	Chromosome 15 (mouse)
Band	15|15 D3	Start	71,667,644 bp
Band	15|15 D3	End	71,906,076 bp
RNA expression pattern
Bgee	Human / Mouse (ortholog); Top expressed in: pituitary gland; anterior pituitary; tibia; corpus epididymis; seminal vesicula; ganglionic eminence; smooth muscle tissue; prostate; synovial joint; islet of Langerhans / Top expressed in: spermatid; body of femur; fossa; seminiferous tubule; ankle; trigeminal ganglion; calvaria; soleus muscle; molar; spermatocyte; More reference expression data
BioGPS	n/a
Gene ontology
Molecular function	extracellular matrix structural constituent
Cellular component	cytoplasm; extracellular region; collagen; endoplasmic reticulum lumen; extracellular space; extracellular matrix
Biological process	extracellular matrix organization
Sources:Amigo / QuickGO
Orthologs
Databases	NCBI: entry
Species	Human	Mouse
Entrez	169044	69700
Ensembl	n/a	ENSMUSG00000079022
UniProt	Q8NFW1	n/a
RefSeq (mRNA)	NM_152888	NM_027174
RefSeq (protein)	NP_690848	n/a
Location (UCSC)	n/a	Chr 15: 71.67 – 71.91 Mb
PubMed search
- Wikidata
View/Edit Human	View/Edit Mouse

COL22A1 is a human gene encoding for collagen. The associated protein is thought to contribute to the stabilization of myotendinous junctions and strengthen skeletal muscle attachments during muscle contraction.
