= Triple helix =

Set of three congruent geometrical helices with the same axis

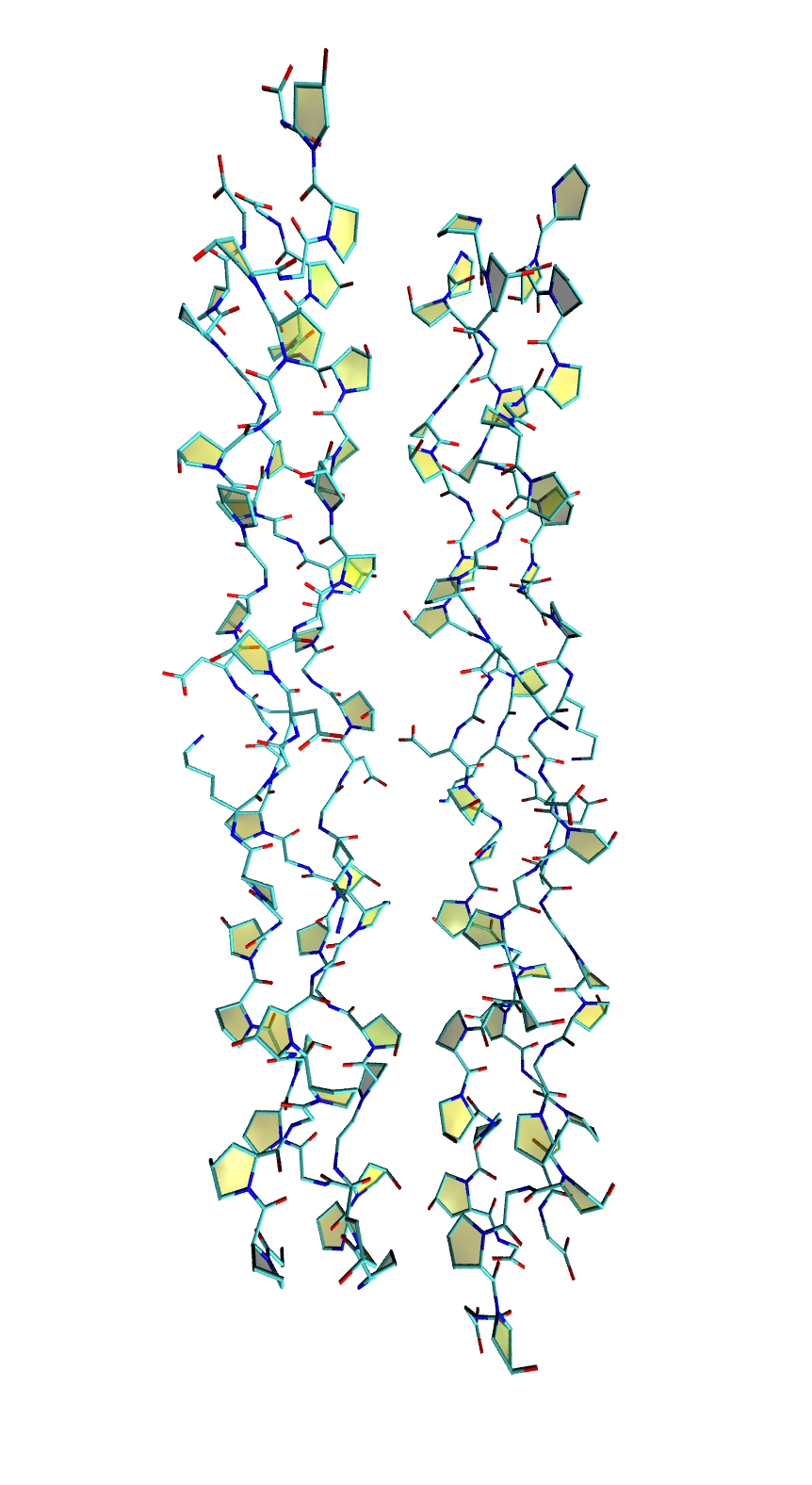
The collagen triple helix is a triple helix formed from three separate protein helices, spiraling around the same axis.

In the fields of geometry and biochemistry, a triple helix (pl.: triple helices) is a set of three congruent geometrical helices with the same axis, differing by a translation along the axis. This means that each of the helices keeps the same distance from the central axis. As with a single helix, a triple helix may be characterized by its pitch, diameter, and handedness. Examples of triple helices include triplex DNA, triplex RNA, the collagen helix, and collagen-like proteins.

== Structure ==
A triple helix is named such because it is made up of three separate helices. Each of these helices shares the same axis, but they do not take up the same space because each helix is translated angularly around the axis. Generally, the identity of a triple helix depends on the type of helices that make it up. For example: a triple helix made of three strands of collagen protein is a collagen triple helix, and a triple helix made of three strands of DNA is a DNA triple helix.

As with other types of helices, triple helices have handedness: right-handed or left-handed. A right-handed helix moves around its axis in a clockwise direction from beginning to end. A left-handed helix is the right-handed helix's mirror image, and it moves around the axis in a counterclockwise direction from beginning to end. The beginning and end of a helical molecule are defined based on certain markers in the molecule that do not change easily. For example: the beginning of a helical protein is its N terminus, and the beginning of a single strand of DNA is its 5' end.

The collagen triple helix is made of three collagen peptides, each of which forms its own left-handed polyproline helix. When the three chains combine, the triple helix adopts a right-handed orientation. The collagen peptide is composed of repeats of Gly-X-Y, with the second residue (X) usually being Pro and the third (Y) being hydroxyproline.

A DNA triple helix is made up of three separate DNA strands, each oriented with the sugar/phosphate backbone on the outside of the helix and the bases on the inside of the helix. The bases are the part of the molecule closest to the triple helix's axis, and the backbone is the part of the molecule farthest away from the axis. The third strand occupies the major groove of relatively normal duplex DNA. The bases in triplex DNA are arranged to match up according to a Hoogsteen base pairing scheme. Similarly, RNA triple helices are formed as a result of a single stranded RNA forming hydrogen bonds with an RNA duplex; the duplex consists of Watson-Crick base pairing while the third strand binds via Hoogsteen base pairing.

== Stabilizing factors ==
The collagen triple helix has several characteristics that increase its stability. When proline is incorporated into the Y position of the Gly-X-Y sequence, it is post-translationally modified to hydroxyproline. The hydroxyproline can enter into favorable interactions with water, which stabilizes the triple helix because the Y residues are solvent-accessible in the triple helix structure. The individual helices are also held together by an extensive network of amide-amide hydrogen bonds formed between the strands, each of which contributes approximately -2 kcal/mol to the overall free energy of the triple helix. The formation of the superhelix not only protects the critical glycine residues on the interior of the helix, but also protects the overall protein from proteolysis.

Triple helix DNA and RNA are stabilized by many of the same forces that stabilize double-stranded DNA helices. With nucleotide bases oriented to the inside of the helix, closer to its axis, bases engage in hydrogen bonding with other bases. The bonded bases in the center exclude water, so the hydrophobic effect is particularly important in the stabilization of DNA triple helices.

== Biological role ==
=== Proteins ===
Members of the collagen superfamily are major contributors to the extracellular matrix. The triple helical structure provides strength and stability to collagen fibers by providing great resistance to tensile stress. The rigidity of the collagen fibers is an important factor that can withstand most mechanical stress, making it an ideal protein for macromolecular transport and overall structural support throughout the body.

=== DNA ===
There are some oligonucleotide sequences, called triplet-forming oligonucleotides (TFOs) that can bind to form a triplex with a longer molecule of double-stranded DNA; TFOs can inactivate a gene or help to induce mutations. TFOs can only bind to certain sites in a larger molecule, so researchers must first determine whether a TFO can bind to the gene of interest. Twisted intercalating nucleic acid is sometimes used to improve this process. Mapping of genome-wide TFO-TTS pairs by sequencing is a useful way to study the triplex forming DNA in the whole genome using oligo-library.

=== RNA ===
In recent years, the biological function of triplex RNA has become more studied. Some roles include increasing stability, translation, influencing ligand binding, and catalysis. One example of ligand binding being influenced by a triple helix is in the SAM-II riboswitch where the triple helix creates a binding site that will uniquely accept S-adenosylmethionine (SAM). The ribonucleoprotein complex telomerase, responsible for replicating the tail-ends of DNA (telomeres) also contains triplex RNA believed to be necessary for proper telomerase functioning. The triple helix at the 3' end of the PAN and MALAT1 long-noncoding RNAs serves to stabilize the RNA by protecting the Poly(A) tail from deadenylation, which subsequently affect their functions in viral pathogenesis and multiple human cancers. Additionally, RNA triple helices can stabilize mRNAs by formation of a poly(A) tail 3'-end binding pocket.

== Computational Tools ==
=== TDF (Triplex Domain Finder) ===
TDF is a Python-based package to predict RNA-DNA triplex formation potential. The software starts by enumerating the substrings between TFO and TTS and uses statistical tests to find out significant result compared to the background.

=== Triplexfpp ===
Triplexfpp is based on deep learning methods. This Python-based pipeline can help predict the most likely triplex-forming lncRNA. However since the lncRNA for training is limited, there is a long way to go before machine learning and deep learning methods can be applied.
