= Neurofilament light polypeptide =

Protein-coding gene in the species Homo sapiens

NEFL

Identifiers
- Aliases: NEFL, CMT1F, CMT2E, NF-L, NF68, NFL, PPP1R110, neurofilament, light polypeptide, neurofilament light, CMTDIG, neurofilament light chain
- External IDs: OMIM: 162280; MGI: 97313; GeneCards: NEFL

Gene location (Human)
Chr.	Chromosome 8 (human)
Band	8p21.2	Start	24,950,955 bp
Band	8p21.2	End	24,956,721 bp

Gene location (Mouse)
Chr.	Chromosome 14 (mouse)
Band	14|14 D1	Start	68,321,312 bp
Band	14|14 D1	End	68,326,544 bp
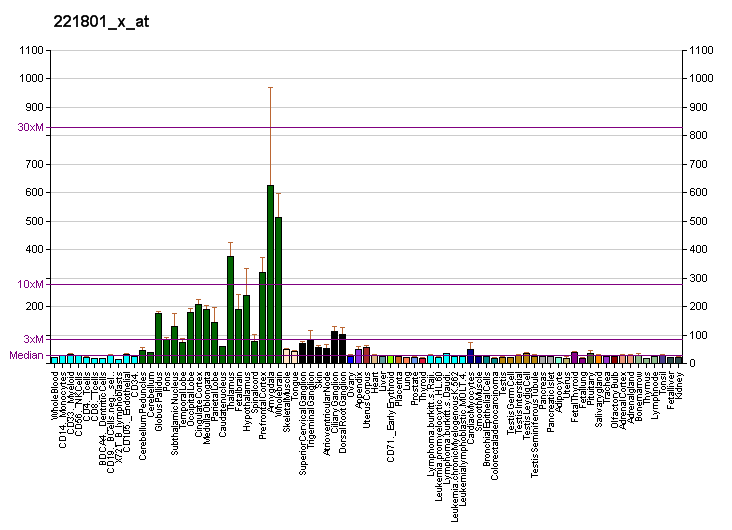

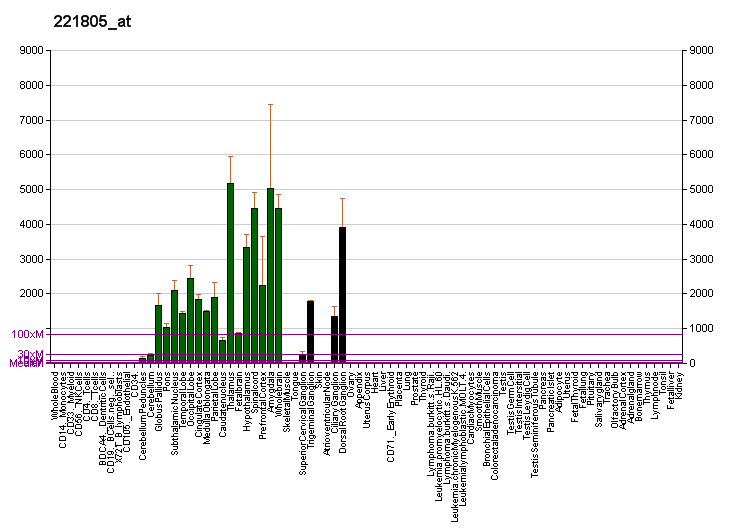

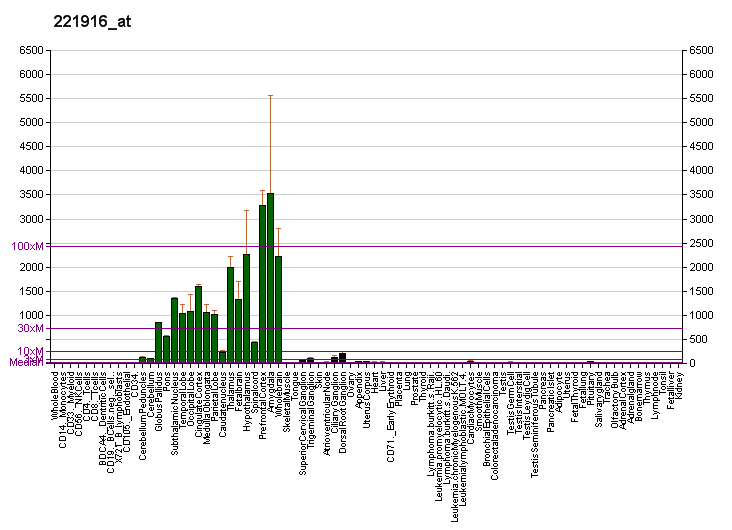
RNA expression pattern
Bgee	Human / Mouse (ortholog); Top expressed in: spinal ganglia; pons; lateral nuclear group of thalamus; endothelial cell; superior vestibular nucleus; Brodmann area 23; orbitofrontal cortex; pars compacta; middle temporal gyrus; frontal pole / Top expressed in: motor neuron; facial motor nucleus; anterior horn of spinal cord; deep cerebellar nuclei; superior cervical ganglion; medial vestibular nucleus; pontine nuclei; trigeminal ganglion; dorsal tegmental nucleus; substantia nigra; More reference expression data
BioGPS	More reference expression data
Gene ontology
Molecular function	protein-macromolecule adaptor activity; structural molecule activity; structural constituent of cytoskeleton; protein C-terminus binding; protein binding; identical protein binding; protein heterodimerization activity; protein domain specific binding; phospholipase binding; structural constituent of postsynaptic intermediate filament cytoskeleton
Cellular component	cytoplasm; cytosol; neurofilament; growth cone; myelin sheath; TSC1-TSC2 complex; axon; neuron projection; intermediate filament; axon cytoplasm; neuromuscular junction; Schaffer collateral - CA1 synapse; cholinergic synapse; postsynaptic intermediate filament cytoskeleton; presynaptic intermediate filament cytoskeleton
Biological process	negative regulation of neuron apoptotic process; retrograde axonal transport; intermediate filament organization; response to sodium arsenite; neuron projection morphogenesis; protein polymerization; intermediate filament bundle assembly; neuromuscular process controlling balance; neurofilament bundle assembly; response to corticosterone; response to peptide hormone; response to organic substance; positive regulation of axonogenesis; MAPK cascade; anterograde axonal transport; axonal transport of mitochondrion; regulation of axon diameter; peripheral nervous system axon regeneration; locomotion; response to acrylamide; spinal cord development; cerebral cortex development; intermediate filament polymerization or depolymerization; neurofilament cytoskeleton organization; hippocampus development; response to toxic substance; microtubule cytoskeleton organization; axon development; synapse maturation; postsynaptic intermediate filament cytoskeleton organization; regulation of NMDA receptor activity
Sources:Amigo / QuickGO
Orthologs
Databases	NCBI: entry; OMA: entry
Species	Human	Mouse
Entrez	4747	18039
Ensembl	ENSG00000277586	ENSMUSG00000022055
UniProt	P07196	P08551
RefSeq (mRNA)	NM_006158	NM_010910
RefSeq (protein)	NP_006149	NP_035040
Location (UCSC)	Chr 8: 24.95 – 24.96 Mb	Chr 14: 68.32 – 68.33 Mb
PubMed search
- Wikidata
View/Edit Human	View/Edit Mouse

Neurofilament light polypeptide is a protein that in humans is encoded by the NEFL gene.

== Structure ==
Neurofilament light polypeptide is a member of the intermediate filament protein family. This protein family consists of over 50 human proteins divided into 5 major classes, the Class I and II keratins, Class III vimentin, GFAP, desmin and the others, the Class IV neurofilaments and the Class V nuclear lamins. There are four major neurofilament subunits, NF-L, NF-M, NF-H and α-internexin. These form heteropolymers which assemble to produce 10 nm neurofilaments which are only expressed in neurons where they are major structural proteins, particularly concentrated in large projection axons. The NF-L protein is encoded by the NEFL gene.

== Function ==
These neurofilament heteropolymers assemble into the cytoskeleton of axons, where they provide structural support and help regulate axonal diameter and conduction velocity. Axons are particularly sensitive to mechanical and metabolic compromise and as a result axonal degeneration is a significant problem in many neurological disorders. Neurofilament light chain is a biomarker that can be measured with immunoassays in cerebrospinal fluid and plasma and reflects axonal damage in a wide variety of neurological disorders.

== Measurement ==
NF-L antibodies employed in the most widely used NF-L assays are specific for cleaved forms of NF-L generated by proteolysis induced by cell death. Methods used in different studies for NfL measurement are sandwich enzyme-linked immunosorbent assay (ELISA), electrochemiluminescence, and high-sensitive single molecule array (SIMOA).

== Clinical significance ==
The detection of neurofilament subunits in CSF and blood has become widely used as a biomarker of ongoing axonal compromise. It is a useful marker for disease monitoring in amyotrophic lateral sclerosis, multiple sclerosis, Alzheimer's disease, and more recently Huntington's disease. It is also a promising marker for follow-up of patients with brain tumors. Higher levels of blood or CSF NF-L have been associated with increased mortality, as would be expected as release of this protein reflects ongoing axonal loss.

It is associated with Charcot–Marie–Tooth disease 1F and 2E.

== Neurofilament assembly ==
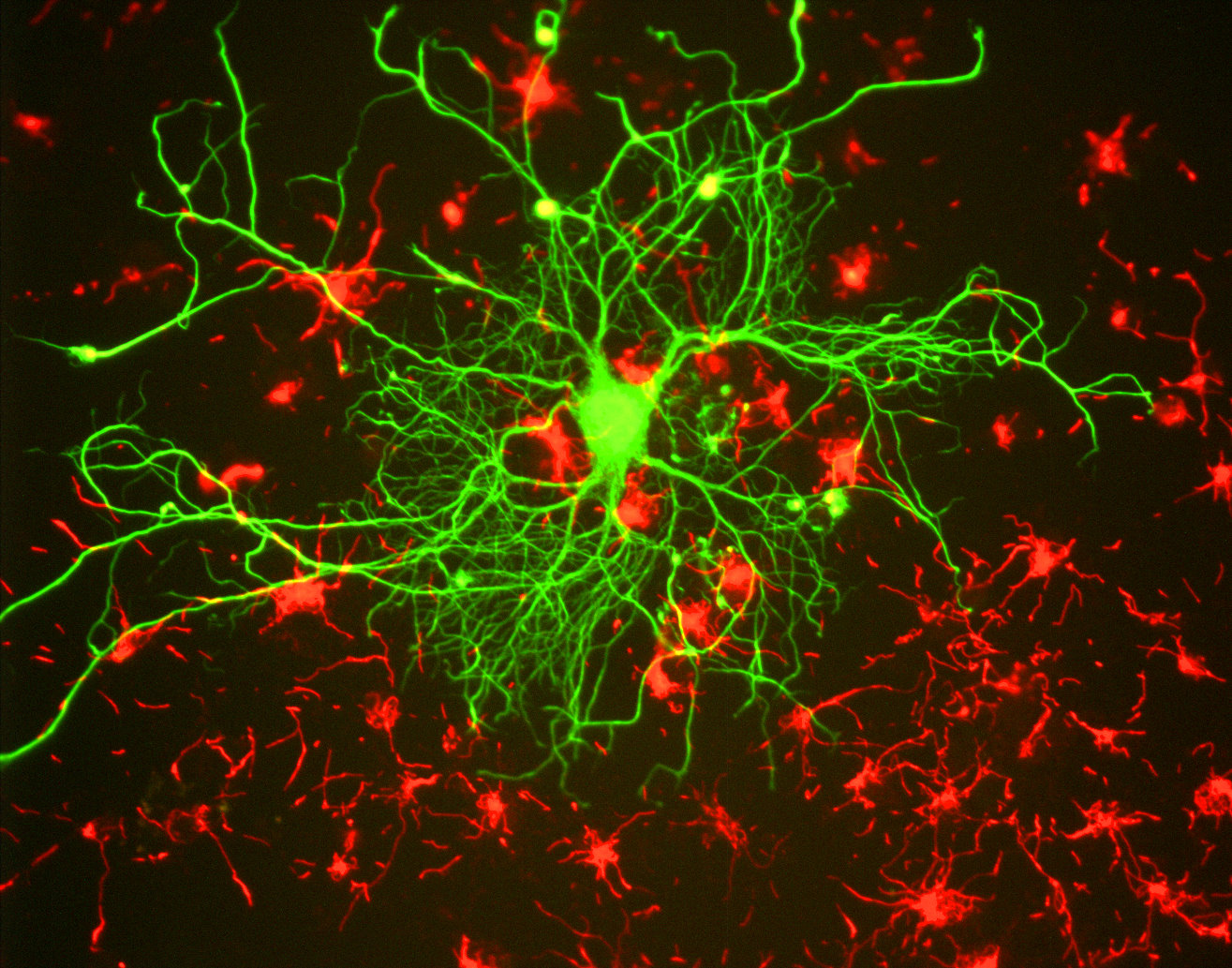
Rat brain cells grown in tissue culture and stained, in green, with an antibody to neurofilament subunit NF-L, which reveals a large neuron. The culture was stained in red for α-internexin, which in this culture is found in neuronal stem cells surrounding the large neuron.

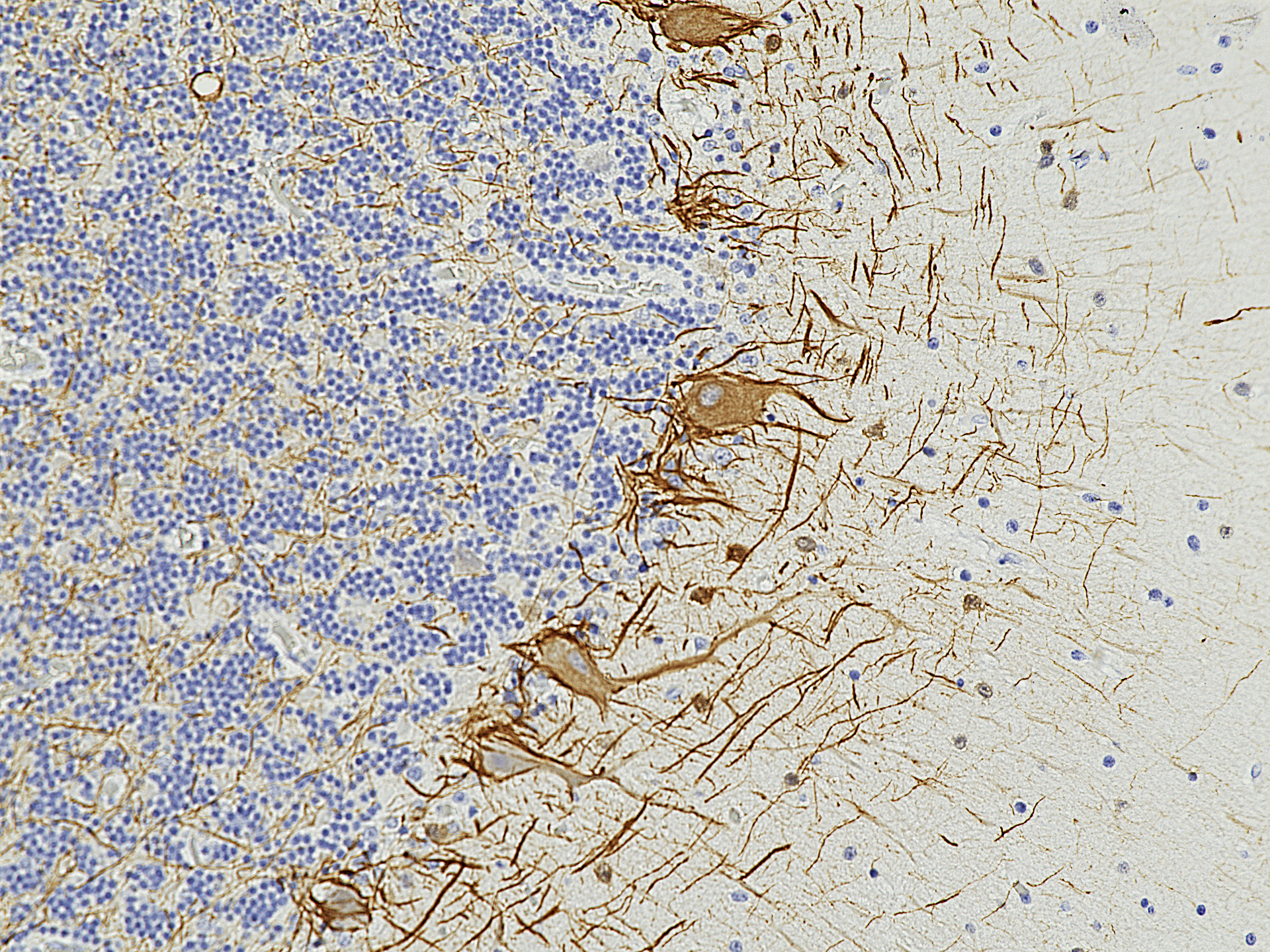
A formalin-fixed and paraffin-embedded section of the human cerebellum is stained with an antibody specific to NF-L, visualized with a brown dye. Cell nuclei are counterstained with a blue dye. The nucleus-rich region on the left side corresponds to the granular layer, while the region on the right represents the molecular layer. The antibody binds to the processes of basket cells, the parallel fiber axons, the perikarya (cell bodies) of Purkinje cells, and various other axons.

Neurofilament light polypeptide (NF-L) is a key structural component of the neuronal cytoskeleton, assembling into neurofilaments along with other intermediate filament proteins such as NF-M, NF-H, and α-internexin. These proteins form obligate heteropolymers that organize into 10 nm diameter filaments, which are selectively expressed in neurons and are particularly concentrated in axons[9]. Neurofilaments provide essential structural support, help maintain axonal diameter, and contribute to the efficient conduction of nerve impulses.

The localization and organization of NF-L in neurons can be visualized using immunohistochemical techniques. In tissue culture preparations of rat brain cells, antibodies specific to NF-L label large neurons prominently in green, revealing their extensive cytoskeletal architecture. In the same cultures, staining for α-internexin in red highlights surrounding neuronal stem cells, indicating the differential expression of these intermediate filament proteins during neural development and differentiation.

In histological sections of human brain tissue, NF-L can also be visualized using immunostaining. For example, in formalin-fixed and paraffin-embedded sections of the human cerebellum, an antibody specific to NF-L reveals its presence throughout various neuronal compartments[7]. The brown-stained antibody binding highlights the axonal processes of basket cells, the parallel fibers of granule cells, the perikarya of Purkinje cells, and other axonal elements. Counterstaining with a blue dye allows for the visualization of cell nuclei, delineating the granular layer on the left side of the section and the molecular layer on the right. These staining patterns underscore the widespread and structurally critical role of NF-L in both developing and mature neurons.

== Interactions ==
Neurofilament light polypeptide has been shown to interact with:

- MAP2,
- Protein kinase N1, and
- TSC1.
