= Nestin (protein) =

Protein found in humans

NES

Identifiers
- Aliases: NES, Nbla00170, nestin
- External IDs: OMIM: 600915; MGI: 101784; GeneCards: NES

Gene location (Human)
Chr.	Chromosome 1 (human)
Band	1q23.1	Start	156,668,763 bp
Band	1q23.1	End	156,677,407 bp

Gene location (Mouse)
Chr.	Chromosome 3 (mouse)
Band	3 F1|3 38.78 cM	Start	87,878,385 bp
Band	3 F1|3 38.78 cM	End	87,887,758 bp
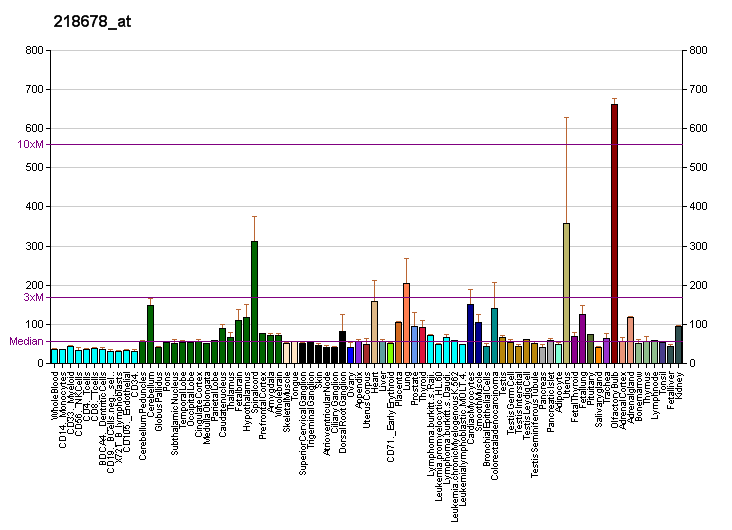
RNA expression pattern
Bgee	Human / Mouse (ortholog); Top expressed in: ventricular zone; glutes; apex of heart; vena cava; embryo; glomerulus; metanephric glomerulus; ganglionic eminence; saphenous vein; right auricle of heart / Top expressed in: ventricular zone; molar; sciatic nerve; otic vesicle; internal carotid artery; saccule; tail of embryo; set of lens fibers; glomerulus; external carotid artery; More reference expression data
BioGPS	More reference expression data
Gene ontology
Molecular function	structural molecule activity; intermediate filament binding; molecular function; protein binding
Cellular component	intermediate filament cytoskeleton; intermediate filament; cytoplasm
Biological process	positive regulation of neural precursor cell proliferation; multicellular organism development; central nervous system development; brain development; positive regulation of intermediate filament depolymerization; negative regulation of catalytic activity; G2/M transition of mitotic cell cycle; negative regulation of protein binding; stem cell proliferation; nervous system development; embryonic camera-type eye development; negative regulation of neuron apoptotic process; cell projection morphogenesis
Sources:Amigo / QuickGO
Orthologs
Databases	NCBI: entry; OMA: entry
Species	Human	Mouse
Entrez	10763	18008
Ensembl	ENSG00000132688	ENSMUSG00000004891
UniProt	P48681	Q6P5H2
RefSeq (mRNA)	NM_006617; NM_024609	NM_016701
RefSeq (protein)	NP_006608	NP_057910
Location (UCSC)	Chr 1: 156.67 – 156.68 Mb	Chr 3: 87.88 – 87.89 Mb
PubMed search
- Wikidata
View/Edit Human	View/Edit Mouse

Nestin is a protein that in humans is encoded by the NES gene.

Nestin (acronym for neuroepithelial stem cell protein) is a type VI intermediate filament (IF) protein. These intermediate filament proteins are expressed mostly in nerve cells where they are implicated in the radial growth of the axon. Seven genes encode for the heavy (NF-H), medium (NF-M) and light neurofilament (NF-L) proteins, nestin and α-internexin in nerve cells, synemin α and desmuslin/synemin β (two alternative transcripts of the DMN gene) in muscle cells, and syncoilin (also in muscle cells). Members of this group mostly preferentially coassemble as heteropolymers in tissues. Steinert et al. has shown that nestin forms homodimers and homotetramers but does not form IF by itself in vitro. In mixtures, nestin preferentially co-assembles with purified vimentin or the type IV IF protein internexin to form heterodimer coiled-coil molecules.

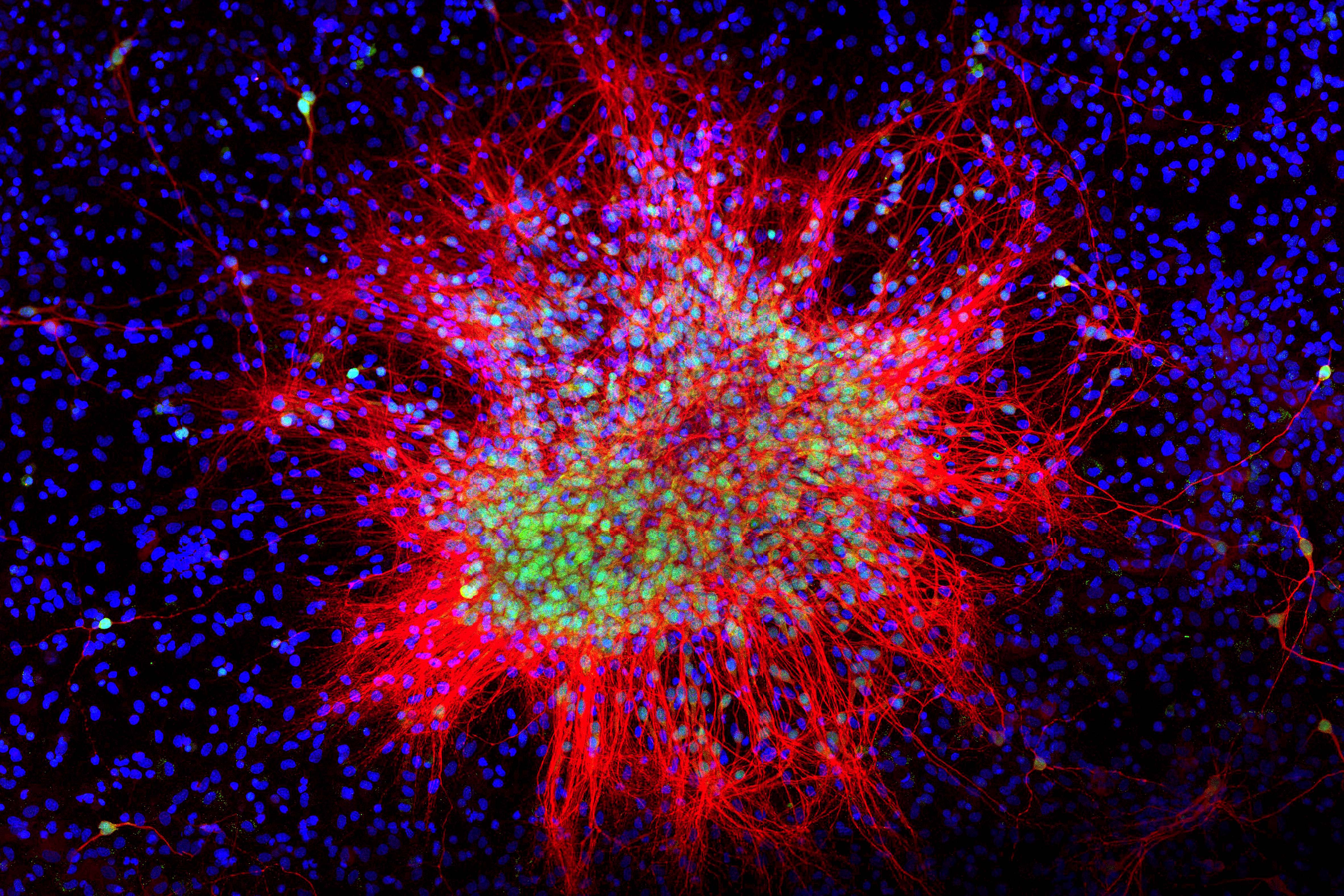
Neuronal stem cells differentiating in cell culture. Neuronal processes are stained using antibody to nestin in red. Neuronal cell bodies are revealed with antibody to FOX3/NeuN in green. Non-neuronal cells are revealed using the DNA dye DAPI in blue. Antibodies, sample processing and image generated by EnCor Biotechnology Inc.

== Gene ==
Structurally, nestin has the shortest head domain (N-terminus) and the longest tail domain (C-terminus) of all the IF proteins. Nestin is of high molecular weight (240 kDa) with a terminus greater than 500 residues (compared to cytokeratins and lamins with termini less than 50 residues).

After subcloning the human nestin gene into plasmid vectors, Dahlstrand et al. determined the nucleotide sequence of all coding regions and parts of the introns. In order to establish the boundaries of the introns, they used the polymerase chain reaction (PCR) to amplify a fragment made from human fetal brain cDNA using two primers located in the first and fourth exon, respectively. The resulting 270 base pair (bp) long fragment was then sequenced directly in its entirety, and intron positions precisely located by comparison with the genomic sequence. Putative initiation and stop codons for the human nestin gene were found at the same positions as in the rat gene, in regions where overall similarity was very high. Based on this assumption, the human nestin gene encodes a protein with 1618 amino acids, i.e. 187 amino acids shorter than the rat protein.

== Expression ==
Nestin is expressed by many types of cells during development, although its expression is usually transient and does not persist into adulthood. One instance of nestin expression in adult organisms, and perhaps that for which nestin is best known, are the neuronal precursor cells of the subgranular zone. Nestin is an intermediate filament protein expressed in dividing cells during the early stages of development in the central nervous system, peripheral nervous system and in myogenic and other tissues. Upon differentiation, nestin becomes downregulated and is replaced by tissue-specific intermediate filament proteins. During neuro- and gliogenesis, nestin is replaced by cell type-specific intermediate filaments, e.g. neurofilaments and glial fibrillary acidic protein (GFAP). Nestin expression is reinduced in the adult during pathological situations, such as the formation of the glial scar after central nervous system injury and during regeneration of injured muscle tissue.

== Function ==
Distribution and expression of nestin in mitotically active cells suggests it plays a role in regulation of the assembly and disassembly of intermediate filaments, which, together with other structural proteins, participate in remodeling of the cell. The role of nestin in dynamic cells, particularly structural organization of the cell, appears strictly regulated by phosphorylation, especially its integration into heterogeneous intermediate filaments together with vimentin or α-internexin. Furthermore, nestin expression has been extensively used as a marker for central nervous system progenitor cells in different contexts, based on observations indicating a correlation between nestin expression and this cell type in vivo.

== Clinical significance ==
Nestin, a protein marker for neural stem cells, is also expressed in follicle stem cells and their immediate, differentiated progeny. The hair follicle bulge area is an abundant, easily accessible source of actively growing pluripotent adult stem cells. Green fluorescent protein (GFP), whose expression is driven by the nestin regulatory element in transgenic mice, serves to mark hair follicle stem cells. These cells can differentiate into neurons, glia, keratinocytes, smooth muscle cells and melanocytes in vitro. Thus, hair follicle stem cells provide an effective, accessible, autologous source of stem cells for treatment of peripheral nerve injury.

Nestin has recently received attention as a marker for detecting newly formed endothelial cells. Nestin is an angiogenesis marker of proliferating endothelial cells in colorectal cancer tissue.

== Interactions ==
Nestin (protein) has been shown to interact with cyclin-dependent kinase 5.
