= Neurofilament =

Type IV intermediate filaments found in the cytoplasm of neurons

NF-L low molecular weight neurofilament protein

Identifiers
- Symbol: NEFL
- NCBI gene: 4747
- HGNC: 7739
- OMIM: 162280
- RefSeq: NM_006158
- UniProt: P07196

Other data
- Locus: Chr. 8 p21
Search for
- Structures: Swiss-model
- Domains: InterPro

NF-M medium molecular weight neurofilament protein

Identifiers
- Symbol: NEFM
- Alt. symbols: NEF3
- NCBI gene: 4741
- HGNC: 7734
- OMIM: 162250
- RefSeq: NM_005382
- UniProt: P07197

Other data
- Locus: Chr. 8 p21
Search for
- Structures: Swiss-model
- Domains: InterPro

NF-H high molecular weight neurofilament protein

Identifiers
- Symbol: NEFH
- NCBI gene: 4744
- HGNC: 7737
- OMIM: 162230
- RefSeq: NM_021076
- UniProt: P12036

Other data
- Locus: Chr. 22 q12.1-13.1
Search for
- Structures: Swiss-model
- Domains: InterPro

Alpha-internexin neuronal intermediate filament protein

Identifiers
- Symbol: INA
- Alt. symbols: NEF5
- NCBI gene: 9118
- HGNC: 6057
- OMIM: 605338
- RefSeq: NM_032727
- UniProt: Q5SYD2

Other data
- Locus: Chr. 10 q24
Search for
- Structures: Swiss-model
- Domains: InterPro

Peripherin neuronal intermediate filament protein

Identifiers
- Symbol: PRPH
- Alt. symbols: NEF4
- NCBI gene: 5630
- HGNC: 9461
- OMIM: 170710
- RefSeq: NM_006262.3
- UniProt: P41219

Other data
- Locus: Chr. 12 q13.12
Search for
- Structures: Swiss-model
- Domains: InterPro

Nestin neuronal stem cell intermediate filament protein

Identifiers
- Symbol: NES
- NCBI gene: 10763
- HGNC: 7756
- OMIM: 600915
- RefSeq: NP_006608
- UniProt: P48681

Other data
- Locus: Chr. 1 q23.1
Search for
- Structures: Swiss-model
- Domains: InterPro

Neurofilaments (NF) are classed as type IV intermediate filaments found in the cytoplasm of neurons. They are protein polymers measuring 10 nm in diameter and many micrometers in length. Together with microtubules (~25 nm) and microfilaments (7 nm), they form the neuronal cytoskeleton. They are believed to function primarily to provide structural support for axons and to regulate axon diameter, which influences nerve conduction velocity. The proteins that form neurofilaments are members of the intermediate filament protein family, which is divided into six types based on their gene organization and protein structure. Types I and II are the keratins which are expressed in epithelia. Type III contains the proteins vimentin, desmin, peripherin and glial fibrillary acidic protein (GFAP). Type IV consists of the neurofilament proteins NF-L, NF-M, NF-H and α-internexin. Type V consists of the nuclear lamins, and type VI consists of the protein nestin. The type IV intermediate filament genes all share two unique introns not found in other intermediate filament gene sequences, suggesting a common evolutionary origin from one primitive type IV gene.

Any proteinaceous filament that extends in the cytoplasm of a nerve cell is also termed a neurofibril. This name is used in the neurofibrillary tangles of some neurodegenerative diseases.

== Neurofilament proteins ==
The protein composition of neurofilaments varies widely across different animal phyla. Most is known about mammalian neurofilaments. Historically, mammalian neurofilaments were originally thought to be composed of just three proteins called neurofilament protein NF-L (low molecular weight; NF-L), NF-M (medium molecular weight; NF-M) and NF-H (high molecular weight; NF-H). These proteins were discovered from studies of axonal transport and are often referred to as the "neurofilament triplet". However, it is now clear that neurofilaments also contain the protein α-internexin and that neurofilaments in the peripheral nervous system can also contain the protein peripherin. (this is different from peripherin 2 that is expressed in the retina). Thus mammalian neurofilaments are heteropolymers of up to five different proteins: NF-L, NF-M, NF-H, α-internexin and peripherin. The five neurofilament proteins can co-assemble in different combinations in different nerve cell types and at different stages of development. The precise composition of neurofilaments in any given nerve cell depends on the relative expression levels of the neurofilament proteins in the cell at that time. For example, NF-H expression is low in developing neurons and increases postnatally in neurons with myelinated axons. In the adult nervous system neurofilaments in small unmyelinated axons contain more peripherin and less NF-H whereas neurofilaments in large myelinated axons contain more NF-H and less peripherin. The type III intermediate filament subunit, vimentin, is expressed in developing neurons and a few very unusual neurons in the adult in association with type IV proteins, such as the horizontal neurons of the retina.

Human neurofilament subunit proteins
Protein	Amino acids	NCBI Ref Seq	Predicted molecular mass	Apparent molecular mass (SDS-PAGE)
Peripherin	470	NP_006253.2	53.7 kDa	~56 kDa
α-Internexin	499	NP_116116.1	55.4 kDa	~66 kDa
Neurofilament protein L	543	NP_006149.2	61.5 kDa	~70 kDa
Neurofilament protein M	916	NP_005373.2	102.5 kDa	~160 kDa
Neurofilament protein H	1020	NP_066554.2	111.9 kDA	~200 kDa

The triplet proteins are named based upon their relative size (low, medium, high). The apparent molecular mass of each protein determined by SDS-PAGE is greater than the mass predicted from the amino sequence. This is due to the anomalous electrophoretic migration of these proteins and is particularly extreme for neurofilament proteins NF-M and NF-H due to their high content of charged amino acids and extensive phosphorylation. All three neurofilament triplet proteins contain long stretches of polypeptide sequence rich in glutamic acid and lysine residues, and NF-M and especially NF-H also contain multiple tandemly repeated serine phosphorylation sites. These sites almost all contain the peptide lysine-serine-proline (KSP), and phosphorylation is normally found on axonal and not dendritic neurofilaments. Human NF-M has 13 of these KSP sites, while human NF-H is expressed from two alleles one of which produces 44 and the other 45 KSP repeats.

== Neurofilament assembly and structure ==
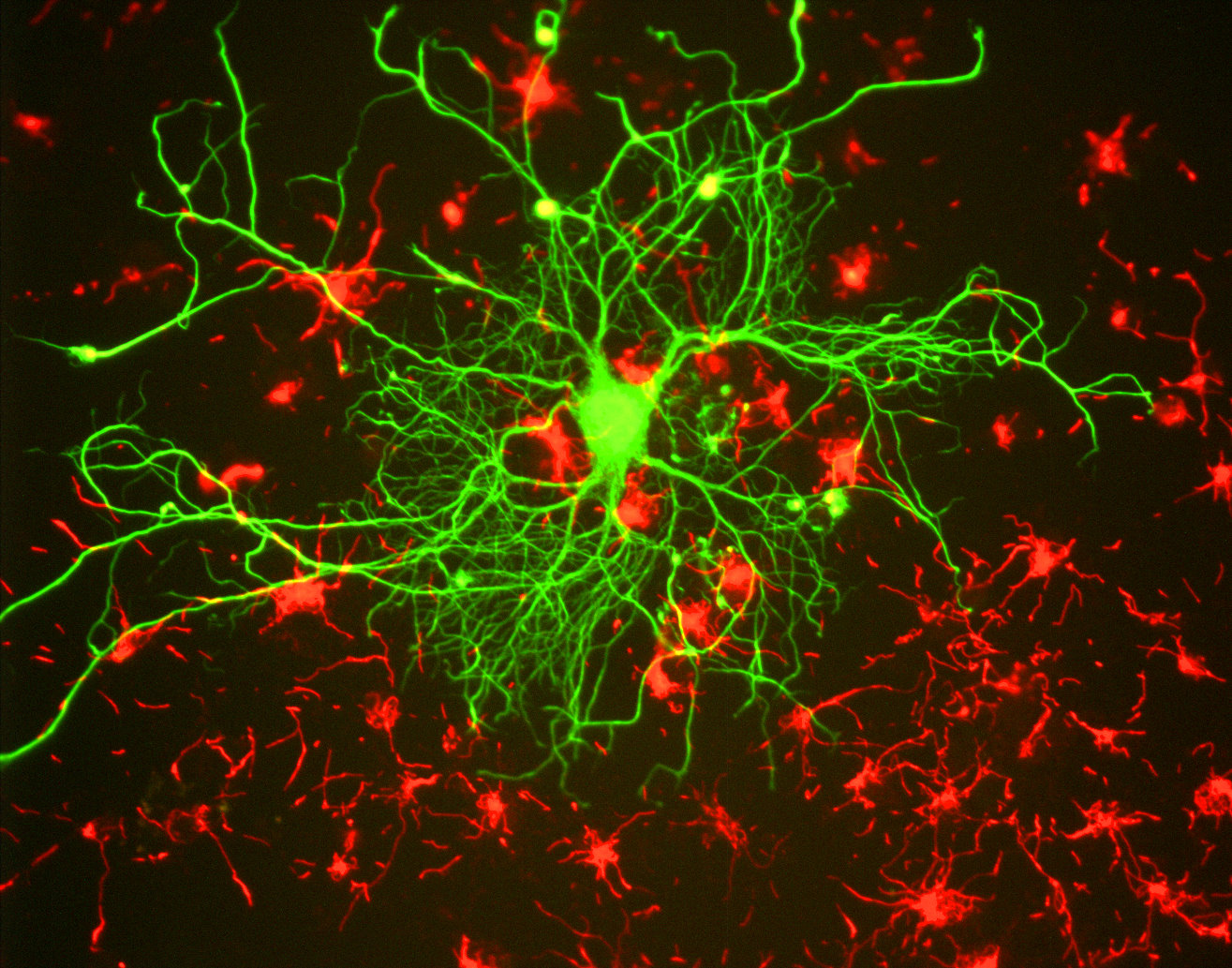
Rat brain cells grown in tissue culture and stained, in green, with an antibody to neurofilament subunit NF-L, which reveals a large neuron. The culture was stained in red for α-internexin, which in this culture is found in neuronal stem cells surrounding the large neuron. Antibodies, culture processing and image from EnCor Biotechnology Inc..

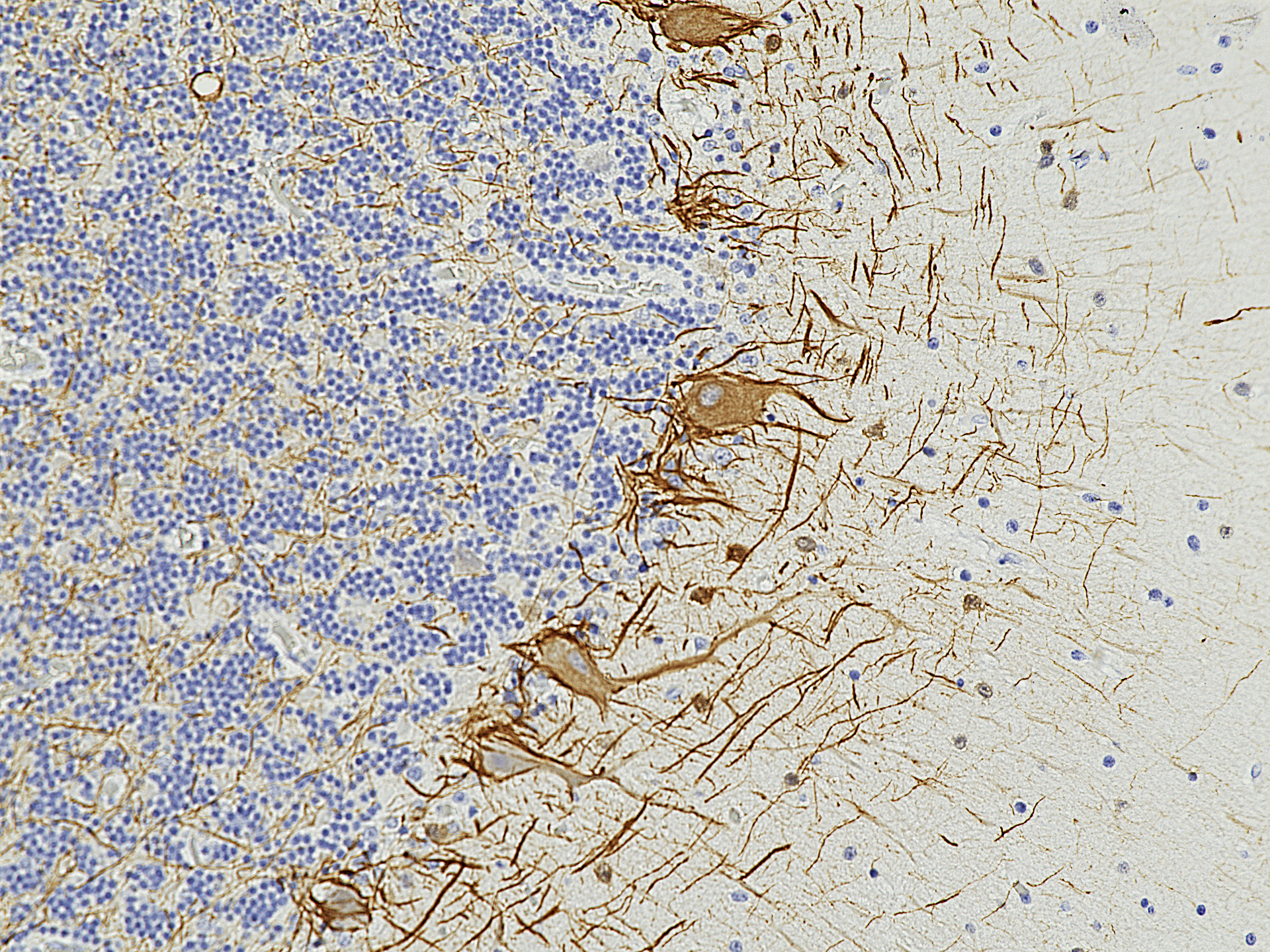
A formalin fixed and paraffin embedded section of human cerebellum stained with an antibody to neurofilament light, NF-L revealed with a brown dye, cell nuclei are revealed with a blue dye. Nuclear rich region at left is granular layer, region at right is molecular layer. The antibody binds processes of basket cells, parallel fiber axons, the perikarya of Purkinje cells and various other axons.

Like other intermediate filament proteins, the neurofilament proteins all share a common central alpha helical region, known as the rod domain because of its rod-like tertiary structure, flanked by amino terminal and carboxy terminal domains that are largely unstructured. The rod domains of two neurofilament proteins dimerize to form an alpha-helical coiled coil. Two dimers associate in a staggered antiparallel manner to form a tetramer. This tetramer is believed to be the basic subunit (i.e. building block) of the neurofilament. Tetramer subunits associate side-to-side to form unit-length filaments, which then anneal end-to-end to form the mature neurofilament polymer, but the precise organization of these subunits within the polymer is not known, largely because of the heterogeneous protein composition and the inability to crystallize neurofilaments or neurofilament proteins. Structural models generally assume eight tetramers (32 neurofilament polypeptides) in a filament cross-section, but measurements of linear mass density suggest that this can vary.

The amino terminal domains of the neurofilament proteins contain numerous phosphorylation sites and appear to be important for subunit interactions during filament assembly. The carboxy terminal domains appear to be intrinsically disordered domains that lack alpha helix or beta sheet. The different sizes of the neurofilament proteins are largely due to differences in the length of the carboxy terminal domains. These domains are rich in acidic and basic amino acid residues. The carboxy terminal domains of NF-M and NF-H are the longest and are modified extensively by post-translational modifications such as phosphorylation and glycosylation in vivo. They project radially from the filament backbone to form a dense brush border of highly charged and unstructured domains analogous to the bristles on a bottle brush. These entropically flailing domains have been proposed to define a zone of exclusion around each filament, effectively spacing the filaments apart from their neighbors. In this way, the carboxy terminal projections maximize the space-filling properties of the neurofilament polymers. By electron microscopy, these domains appear as projections called sidearms that appear to contact neighboring filaments.

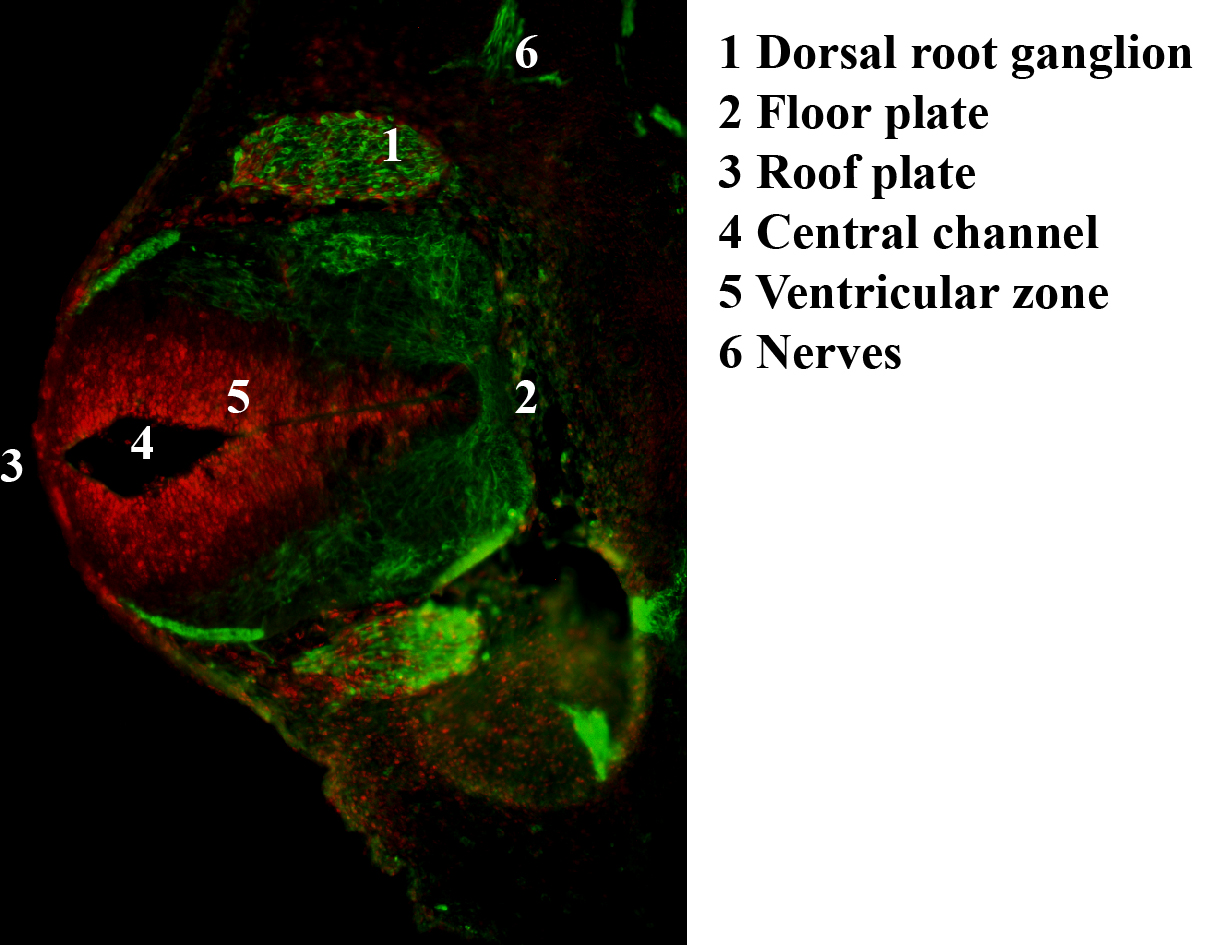
Antibody stain against neurofilament (green) and Ki 67 (red) in a mouse embryo 12.5 days after fertilization. The cells expressing neurofilaments are in the dorsal root ganglia shown in green while proliferating cells are in the ventricular zone in the neural tube and colored red.

== Neurofilament function ==
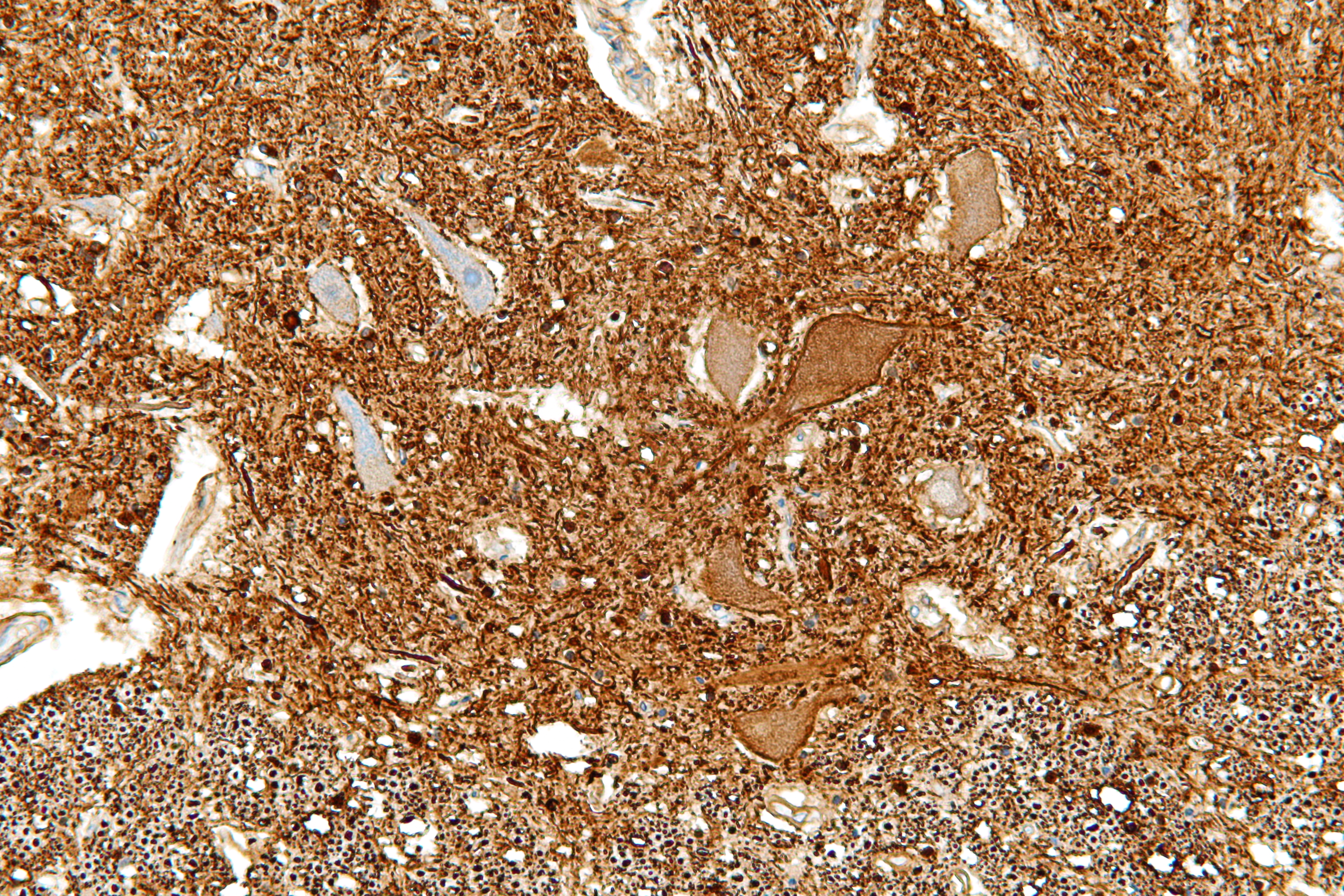
Micrograph of white matter (bottom of image) and the anterior horn of the spinal cord showing motor neurons with central chromatolysis. Neurofilament immunostain.

Neurofilaments are found in vertebrate neurons in especially high concentrations in axons, where they are all aligned in parallel along the long axis of the axon forming a continuously overlapping array. They have been proposed to function as space-filling structures that increase axonal diameter. Their contribution to axon diameter is determined by the number of neurofilaments in the axon and their packing density. The number of neurofilaments in the axon is thought to be determined by neurofilament gene expression and axonal transport. The packing density of the filaments is determined by their side-arms which define the spacing between neighboring filaments. Phosphorylation of the sidearms is thought to increase their extensibility, increasing the spacing between neighboring filaments by the binding of divalent cations between the sidearms of adjacent filaments

Early in development, axons are narrow processes that contain relatively few neurofilaments. Those axons that become myelinated accumulate more neurofilaments, which drives the expansion of their caliber. After an axon has grown and connected with its target cell, the diameter of the axon may increase as much as fivefold. This is caused by an increase in the number of neurofilaments exported from the nerve cell body as well as a slowing of their rate of transport. In mature myelinated axons, neurofilaments can be the single most abundant cytoplasmic structure and can occupy most of the axonal cross-sectional area. For example, a large myelinated axon may contain thousands of neurofilaments in one cross-section

== Neurofilament transport ==
In addition to their structural role in axons, neurofilaments are also cargoes of axonal transport. Most of the neurofilament proteins in axons are synthesized in the nerve cell body, where they rapidly assemble into neurofilament polymers within about 30 minutes. These assembled neurofilament polymers are transported along the axon on microtubule tracks powered by microtubule motor proteins. The filaments move bidirectionally, i.e. both towards the axon tip (anterograde) and towards the cell body (retrograde), but the net direction is anterograde. The filaments move at velocities of up to 8 μm/s on short time scales (seconds or minutes), with average velocities of approximately 1 μm/s. However, the average velocity on longer time scales (hours or days) is slow because the movements are very infrequent, consisting of brief sprints interrupted by long pauses. Thus on long time scales neurofilaments move in the slow component of axonal transport.

== Clinical and research applications ==
Numerous specific antibodies to neurofilament proteins have been developed and are commercially available. These antibodies can be used to detect neurofilament proteins in cells and tissues using immunofluorescence microscopy or immunohistochemistry. Such antibodies are widely used to identify neurons and their processes in histological sections and in tissue culture. The type VI intermediate filament protein Nestin is expressed in developing neurons and glia. Nestin is considered a marker of neuronal stem cells, and the presence of this protein is widely used to define neurogenesis. This protein is lost as development proceeds.

Neurofilament antibodies are also commonly used in diagnostic neuropathology. Staining with these antibodies can distinguish neurons (positive for neurofilament proteins) from glia (negative for neurofilament proteins).

There is also considerable clinical interest in the use of neurofilament proteins as biomarkers of axonal damage in diseases affecting the central nervous system. When neurons or axons degenerate, neurofilament proteins are released into the blood or cerebrospinal fluid. Immunoassays of neurofilament proteins in cerebrospinal fluid and plasma can thus serve as indicators of axonal damage in neurological disorders. NF-L levels in blood and CSF are therefore useful markers for disease monitoring in amyotrophic lateral sclerosis, multiple sclerosis, spinal muscular atrophy, and more recently Huntington's disease. It has also been evaluated as a prognostic marker for functional outcome following acute ischemic stroke. After an acute ischemic stroke, blood levels of NF-L increase continuously during the first week, reaching peak levels around two weeks after symptom onset. Mutant mice with neurofilament abnormalities have phenotypes resembling amyotrophic lateral sclerosis. Recent work performed as a collaboration between EnCor Biotechnology Inc. and the University of Florida showed that the NF-L antibodies employed in the most widely used NF-L assays are specific for cleaved forms of NF-L generated by proteolysis induced by cell death.

== See also ==
- Bielschowsky stain
