= Synemin =

Protein found in humans

SYNM

Identifiers
- Aliases: SYNM, DMN, SYN, synemin
- External IDs: OMIM: 606087; MGI: 2661187; GeneCards: SYNM

Gene location (Human)
Chr.	Chromosome 15 (human)
Band	15q26.3	Start	99,098,217 bp
Band	15q26.3	End	99,135,593 bp

Gene location (Mouse)
Chr.	Chromosome 7 (mouse)
Band	7|7 C	Start	67,379,908 bp
Band	7|7 C	End	67,409,490 bp
RNA expression pattern
Bgee	Human / Mouse (ortholog); Top expressed in: seminal vesicula; saphenous vein; Skeletal muscle tissue of rectus abdominis; glutes; vastus lateralis muscle; tail of epididymis; Skeletal muscle tissue of biceps brachii; optic nerve; right ventricle; deltoid muscle / Top expressed in: triceps brachii muscle; knee joint; medial head of gastrocnemius muscle; vastus lateralis muscle; temporal muscle; sternocleidomastoid muscle; tibialis anterior muscle; muscle of thigh; digastric muscle; ankle; More reference expression data
BioGPS	n/a
Gene ontology
Molecular function	vinculin binding; protein binding; structural molecule activity; intermediate filament binding; structural constituent of cytoskeleton; structural constituent of muscle
Cellular component	cytoplasm; cell junction; costamere; membrane; cytoskeleton; intermediate filament; adherens junction; neurofilament cytoskeleton; sarcolemma
Biological process	intermediate filament cytoskeleton organization; fast-twitch skeletal muscle fiber contraction
Sources:Amigo / QuickGO
Orthologs
Databases	NCBI: entry; OMA: entry
Species	Human	Mouse
Entrez	23336	233335
Ensembl	ENSG00000182253	ENSMUSG00000030554
UniProt	O15061	Q70IV5
RefSeq (mRNA)	NM_145728; NM_015286	NM_183312; NM_201639; NM_207663
RefSeq (protein)	NP_056101; NP_663780	NP_899135; NP_964001; NP_997546
Location (UCSC)	Chr 15: 99.1 – 99.14 Mb	Chr 7: 67.38 – 67.41 Mb
PubMed search
- Wikidata
View/Edit Human	View/Edit Mouse

Synemin, also known as desmuslin, is a protein that in humans is encoded by the SYNM gene. Synemin is an intermediate filament (IF) family member. IF proteins are cytoskeletal proteins that confer resistance to mechanical stress and are encoded by a dispersed multigene family. This protein has been found to form a linkage between desmin, which is a subunit of the IF network, and the extracellular matrix, and provides an important structural support in muscle.

== Function ==
Synemin is an intermediate filament (IF) and, like other IFs, primarily functions to integrate mechanical stress and maintain structural integrity in eukaryotic cells. While it has been observed in a variety of cell types, it has been best studied in the sarcomere of skeletal myocytes. It localizes at the Z-disk and has been shown to bind to α-dystrobrevin, α-actinin, and desmin to act as a mechanical linker in transmitting force laterally throughout the tissue, especially between the contractile myofibrils and extracellular matrix. Synemin contributes to linkage between costameres and the contractile apparatus in skeletal muscle of synemin null animals. Synemin plays an important regulatory role in the heart and the consequences of its absence are profound.

== Properties ==
Synemin has properties very similar to the intermediate filament syncoilin. In particular, it binds to α-dystrobrevin in the dystrophin-associated protein complex to act as a mechanical "linker" between the myofibrillar network and the cell membrane.

== Splice variants ==
Three splice variant isoforms of synemin exist, α and β and L. Both isoforms have a very short N-terminal domain of 10 amino acids and a long C-terminal domain consisting of 1243 amino acids for the α isoform and 931 amino acids for the β isoform. An intronic sequence of the synemin β isoform is used as a coding sequence for synemin α.

== Cancer ==
SYNM gene has been observed progressively downregulated in Human papillomavirus-positive neoplastic keratinocytes derived from uterine cervical preneoplastic lesions at different levels of malignancy. For this reason, SYNM is likely to be associated with tumorigenesis and may be a potential prognostic marker for uterine cervical preneoplastic lesions progression.

== History ==
The origin of the synemin/desmuslin naming convention is quite complex. In 1980, synemin was first identified in avian smooth muscle and was initially described as an IF-associated protein due to its colocalization and copurification with desmin and vimentin. Subsequent to the cloning of chicken synemin, Mizuno and colleagues reported the cloning of a novel IF protein, human desmuslin, as an α-dystrobrevin-interacting protein. Sequence analysis showed that human desmuslin was 32% identical and 11% similar to the amino acid sequence of chicken synemin, while the IF proteins vimentin and desmin are more than 80% identical across the same species. Although several parts were very similar between human desmuslin and chicken synemin, the low degree of conservation between these two proteins compared to other cloned IF proteins suggested that synemin was not the human desmuslin orthologue. In addition, unlike chicken synemin, in vitro coimmunoprecipitation assays could not detect an interaction between human desmuslin and α-actinin. In 2001, Titeux and colleagues reported the cloning of the α and β splice-varying isoforms of human synemin and showed that β-synemin was identical to desmuslin. In 2014 was reported the first synemin -/- null animal.
