= Microtubule-associated protein 2 =

Mammalian protein found in Homo sapiens

MAP2

Identifiers
- Aliases: MAP2, MAP2A, MAP2B, MAP2C, microtubule associated protein 2, MAP-2
- External IDs: OMIM: 157130; MGI: 97175; GeneCards: MAP2

Gene location (Human)
Chr.	Chromosome 2 (human)
Band	2q34	Start	209,424,058 bp
Band	2q34	End	209,734,118 bp

Gene location (Mouse)
Chr.	Chromosome 1 (mouse)
Band	1 C3|1 33.49 cM	Start	66,214,432 bp
Band	1 C3|1 33.49 cM	End	66,481,742 bp
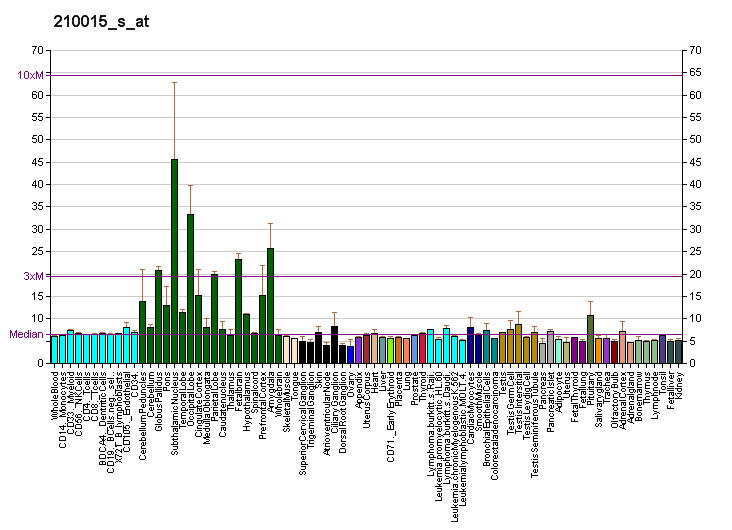
RNA expression pattern
Bgee	Human / Mouse (ortholog); Top expressed in: Brodmann area 23; endothelial cell; superior vestibular nucleus; entorhinal cortex; pons; pars compacta; parietal lobe; postcentral gyrus; middle temporal gyrus; pars reticulata / Top expressed in: anterior amygdaloid area; ventromedial nucleus; nucleus accumbens; lateral septal nucleus; superior frontal gyrus; paraventricular nucleus of hypothalamus; olfactory tubercle; dorsomedial hypothalamic nucleus; olfactory bulb; subiculum; More reference expression data
BioGPS	More reference expression data
Gene ontology
Molecular function	tubulin binding; protein binding; structural molecule activity; dystroglycan binding; calmodulin binding; microtubule binding; tau protein binding
Cellular component	nucleolus; microtubule; microtubule associated complex; cytoskeleton; cytoplasm; cytosol; dendrite; cell projection; intracellular anatomical structure; postsynaptic density; nuclear periphery; neuron projection; soma; dendritic shaft; cell body; CA3 pyramidal cell dendrite; dendrite cytoplasm; axon initial segment; axon hillock; dendritic growth cone; main axon; dendritic branch; basal dendrite; primary dendrite; distal dendrite; apical distal dendrite; dendritic filopodium; proximal dendrite; proximal neuron projection
Biological process	neuron projection development; microtubule cytoskeleton organization; microtubule bundle formation; dendrite morphogenesis; central nervous system neuron development; axonogenesis; dendrite development; establishment of cell polarity; regulation of axonogenesis; cellular response to organic substance; negative regulation of axon extension; regulation of microtubule polymerization; negative regulation of microtubule polymerization; positive regulation of anterograde dense core granule transport; regulation of organelle transport along microtubule; positive regulation of anterograde synaptic vesicle transport; negative regulation of microtubule binding
Sources:Amigo / QuickGO
Orthologs
Databases	NCBI: entry; OMA: entry
Species	Human	Mouse
Entrez	4133	17756
Ensembl	ENSG00000078018	ENSMUSG00000015222
UniProt	P11137	P20357
RefSeq (mRNA)	NM_001039538; NM_002374; NM_031845; NM_031846; NM_031847 NM_001363910; NM_001363911; NM_001363913	NM_001039934; NM_008632; NM_001310634
RefSeq (protein)	NP_001034627; NP_002365; NP_114033; NP_114035; NP_001350839 NP_001350840; NP_001350842; NP_001362403; NP_001362422; NP_001362423; NP_001362424; NP_001362425; NP_001362426; NP_001362427; NP_001362428; NP_001362429; NP_001362430; NP_001362431; NP_001362432; NP_001362433; NP_001362434; NP_001362435; NP_001362436; NP_001362437; NP_001362438; NP_001362439; NP_001362455; NP_001362456; NP_001362457; NP_001362458; NP_001362459; NP_001362460; NP_001362461; NP_001362462; NP_001362463; NP_001362464; NP_001362465; NP_001362466; NP_001362467; NP_001362468; NP_001362469; NP_001362470; NP_001362471; NP_001362472; NP_001362473; NP_001362474; NP_001362475; NP_001362477; NP_001362480; NP_001362481; NP_001362482; NP_001362483; NP_001362484; NP_001362485; NP_001362486; NP_001362487; NP_001362488; NP_001362512	NP_001035023; NP_001297563; NP_032658
Location (UCSC)	Chr 2: 209.42 – 209.73 Mb	Chr 1: 66.21 – 66.48 Mb
PubMed search
- Wikidata
View/Edit Human	View/Edit Mouse

Microtubule-associated protein 2 is a protein in humans that is encoded by the MAP2 gene.

== Function ==
This gene encodes a protein that belongs to the microtubule-associated protein family. The proteins of this family were originally isolated since they copurify with tubulin in polymerization experiments: tubulin in cell extracts can be made to polymerize to produce microtubules (MT) under the influence of heat and the addition of GTP, and the MT can then be collected by centrifugation. When this is done a series of microtubule associated proteins are collected along with the MT and can be detected by SDS-PAGE and other methods. Brain extracts are rich in several of these proteins, MAP2 being one of these. The single MAP2 gene produces four major transcripts producing four proteins, MAP2A, MAP2B, MAP2C and MAP2D. MAP2A and MAP2B are very high molecular weight proteins, with apparent molecular weight on SDS-PAGE about 250 kDa, while MAP2C and MAP2D are much lower molecular weight forms with apparent SDS-PAGE size about 70 kDa. All forms of MAP2 share a common core sequence which includes MT binding domains, 18 amino acid sequences which are found in other MT associated proteins such as MAP Tau and MAP1B. The MAP2 isoforms are thought to be involved in MT assembly, which is an essential step in neuritogenesis. MAP2 serves to stabilize MT growth by crosslinking MT with intermediate filaments and other MTs. MAP2 isoforms are neuron-specific cytoskeletal proteins enriched in dendrites and perikarya, implicating a role in determining and stabilizing neuronal morphology during neuron development. As a result, antibodies to MAP2 are widely used to identify neuronal cells and trace dendritic processes in experimental contexts.

== Interactions ==
MAP2 has been shown to interact with Grb2, NEFL and MYO7A. All MAP2 isoforms bind to microtubules.

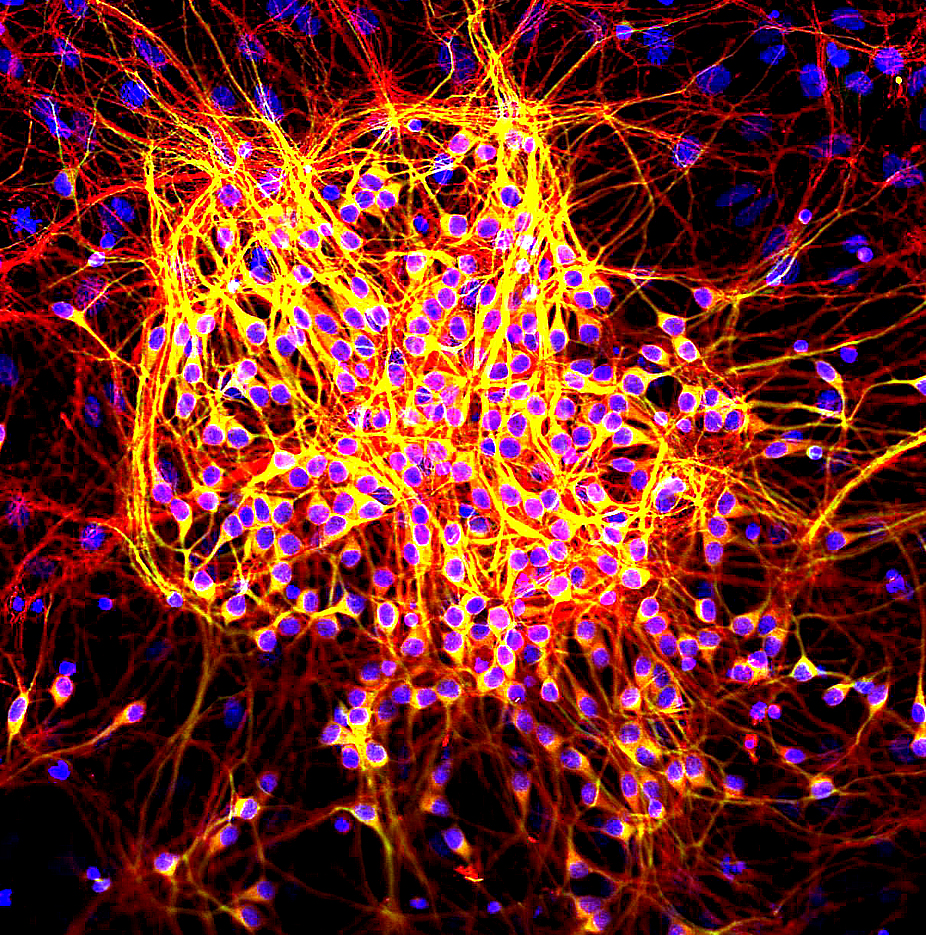
Neurons were grown in tissue culture and stained with antibody to MAP2 protein in green and antibody to another microtubule associated protein MAP-tau in red using the immunofluorescence technique. MAP2 is found only in dendrites and perikarya, while MAP-tau is found not only in the dendrites and perikarya but also in axons. As a result, axons appear red since they contain only MAP-tau while the dendrites and perikarya appear yellow, since they contain both proteins and the red and green signals superimpose to produce a yellow signal. DNA is shown in blue using the DAPI stain which highlights the nuclei. Image courtesy EnCor Biotechnology Inc.
