= EnCor Biotechnology =

American biotechnology company

- Type: Private
- Industry: Biotechnology
- Founder: Gerry Shaw
- Headquarters: Gainesville, Florida, United States
- Area served: Worldwide
- Key people: Gerry Shaw
- Products: Antibodies to neural and yeast proteins
- Website: Homepage of EnCor

EnCor Biotechnology is an American company that manufactures monoclonal and polyclonal antibodies with a focus on reagents targeting neural proteins. EnCor was founded in 1999 as a spin-off from the University of Florida by Gerry Shaw, a British scientist, initially a professor in the Department of Neuroscience, University of Florida, and now professor emeritus. The company is based in Gainesville, Florida.

== History ==
During Dr Shaw’s career at the University of Florida in the 1990s, antibodies made for research purposes were licensed to outside companies for sale. Some of these are still today sold by vendors such as Cell Signaling Technology. EnCor Biotechnology was therefore formed at the end of 1999 initially to market antibody reagents made in Dr. Shaw's research laboratory at lower prices. In late 2001 EnCor rented lab space at the Sid Martin Biotechnology Incubator, a facility dedicated to commercialization of intellectual property generated in the University of Florida. Following this move the EnCor laboratory produced an increasing number of novel antibodies which were made, characterized, documented, manufactured and subjected to rigorous quality control. The company quickly therefore increased the number of reagents available for sale and soon become profitable and, in 2006, relocated to Gainesville, Florida.

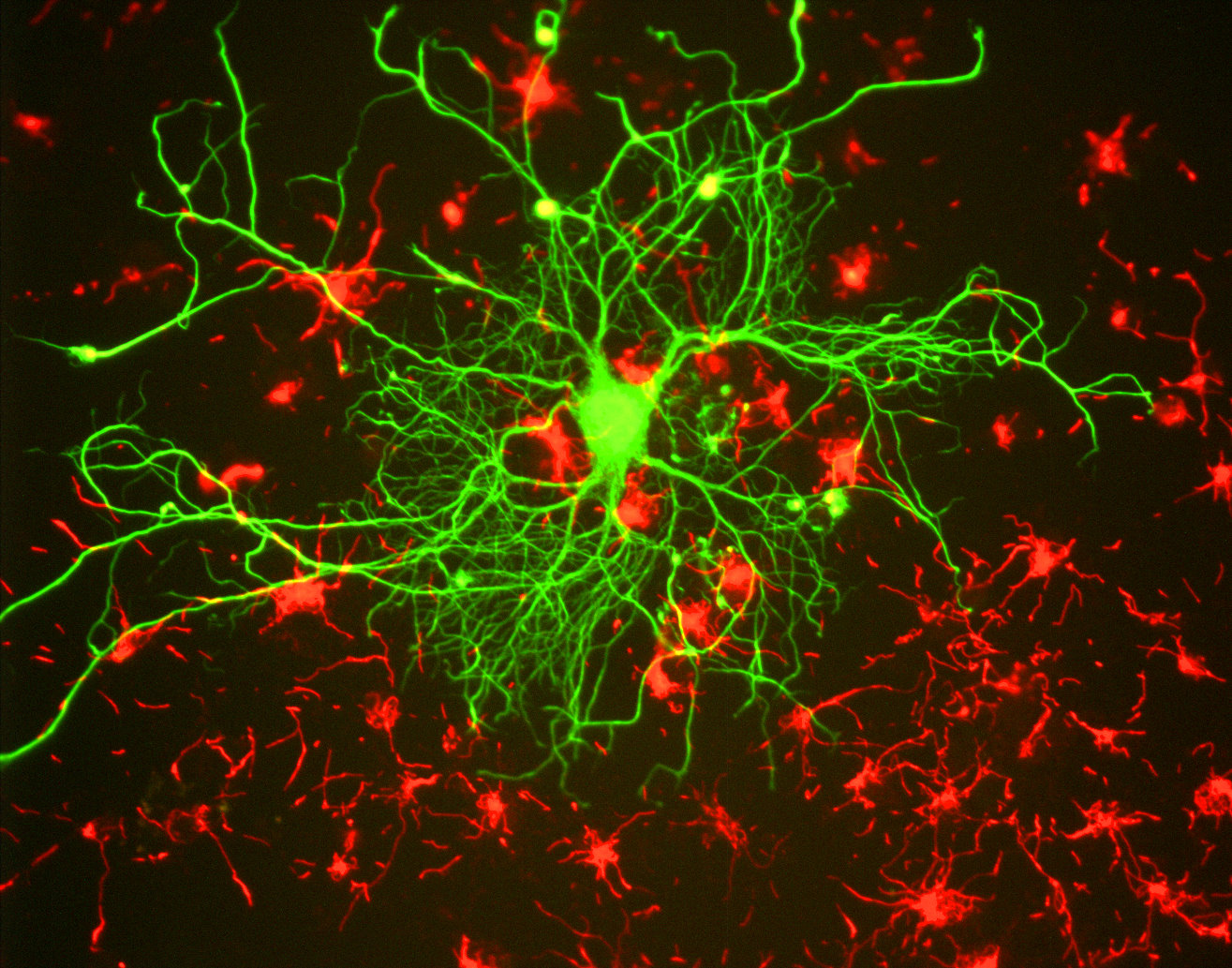
Rat brain cells grown in tissue culture and stained, in green, with an EnCor mouse monoclonal antibody to neurofilament subunit NF-L, (HGNC name NEFL), which reveals a large neuron. The cells in the above image were also stained in red with an EnCor rabbit antibody to α-internexin, which in this culture is found in neuronal stem cells.

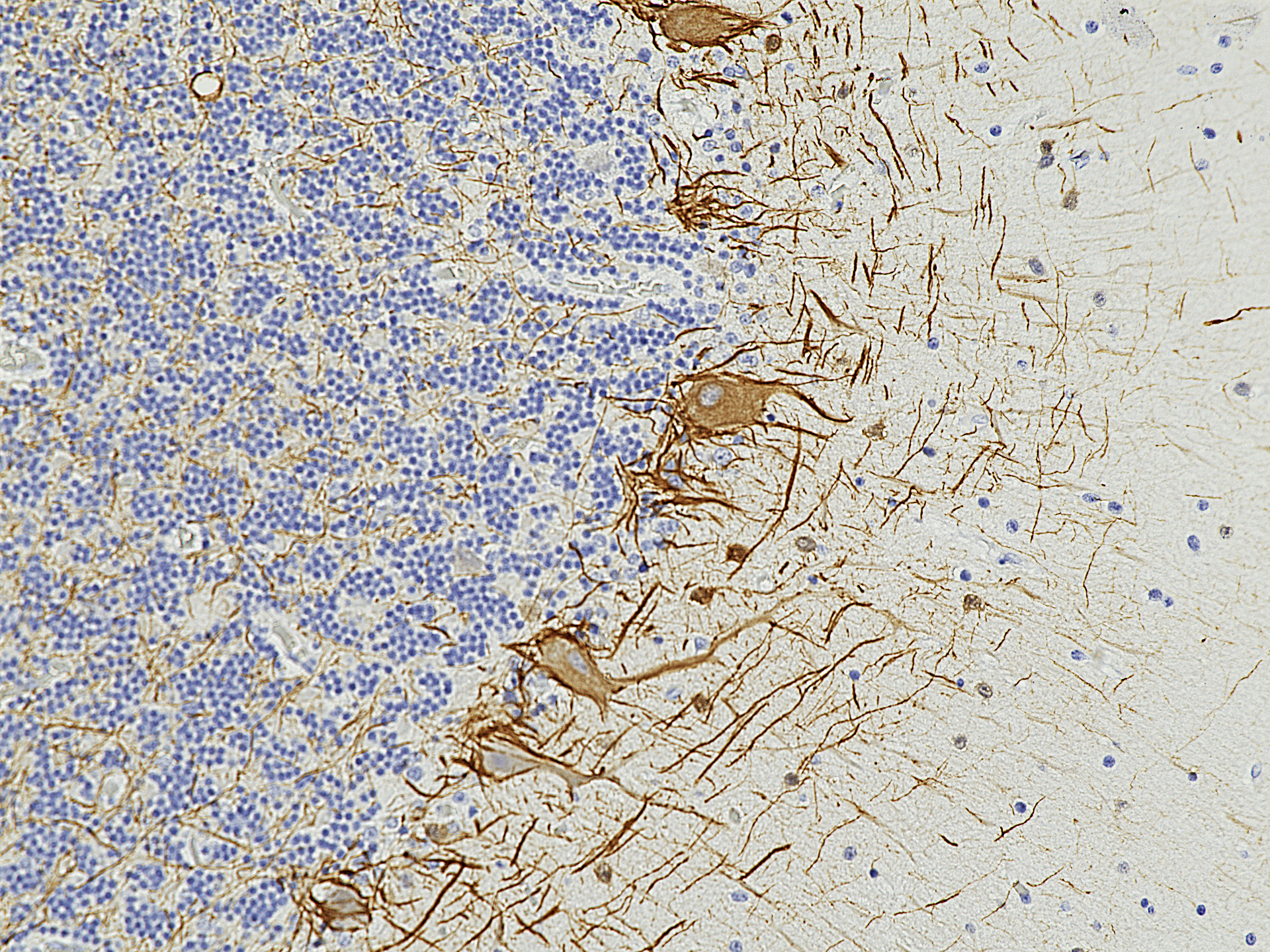
A formalin fixed and paraffin embedded section of human cerebellum stained with an EnCor mouse monoclonal antibody to NF-L revealed with a brown dye, cell nuclei are revealed with a blue dye. Nuclear rich region at left is the cerebellar granular layer, the region at the right with fewer nuclei is the cerebellar molecular layer. The NF-L antibody binds processes of basket cells, parallel fiber axons, the perikarya of Purkinje and some smaller neurons and various other fine axons.

EnCor has always collaborated with basic scientists and clinicians to produce articles in peer-reviewed scientific publications focused on the examination of various plasma, serum and CSF biomarkers of nervous system damage and degeneration. One of these is the phosphorylated, axonal form of the major neurofilament protein heavy chain protein which has the HGNC name NEFH, though is usually referred to as pNF-H in the scientific literature. Two further studies describe novel EnCor assays for UCHL1 and alpha-synuclein, two major brain proteins implicated in the development of Parkinson's and other neurological diseases. In 2022 EnCor, in collaboration with researchers at the University of Florida described a novel class of antibodies to neurofilament light chain with the HGNC name NEFL, although the protein is usually referred to as NF-L. Surprisingly, one class of these antibodies bind epitopes hidden in healthy neurons and their processes but which are revealed on degeneration. Another class of antibody to neurofilament NF-L was shown to bind only neurofilaments in healthy neurons and their processes but failed to recognize degenerating and degenerated neurons and processes. The antibodies degeneration specific antibodies have been dubbed "DegenoTag" reagents and should have wide utility for researchers on neurodegeneration. By 2022, the EnCor product line had increased to over 250 items, the antibodies mostly being used for research purposes, with a particular focus on immunocytochemistry and western blotting, though many are also utilized for immunocytochemistry, immunoprecipitation and ELISA. Some have become useful for diagnostic histopathology and for monitoring the levels of protein biomarkers, of research and potential clinical utility. EnCor supplies reagents to research labs and other reagent companies such as Abcam, BioLegend, Thermo Fisher Scientific, EMD Millipore, and Bio-Techne. EnCor is well known for the quality of its cell, tissue and western blotting images, many of which have been made available on Wikipedia Commons and widely used in books, articles, posters, for teaching, advertising and many other purposes, see .

== Key EnCor publications ==
- Shaw G, Yang C, Ellis R, Anderson K, Parker Mickle J, Scheff S, Pike B, Anderson DK, Howland DR (Nov 2005). "Hyperphosphorylated neurofilament NF-H is a serum biomarker of axonal injury". Biochem. Biophys. Res. Commun. 336 (4): 1268–1277. Bibcode:2005BBRC..336.1268S. doi:10.1016/j.bbrc.2005.08.252. PMID 16176808.
- Shaw G, Madorsky I, Li Y, Wang Y, Rana S, Fuller DD (August 2022). "Uman Type NF-L Antibodies Are Effective Reagents for the Imaging of Neurodegeneration". bioRxiv 10.1101/2022.08.27.504533.
- Shaw G, Madorsky I, Li Y, Wang Y, Rana S, Jorgensen M, Fuller DD (April 2023). "Uman Type Neurofilament Light Antibodies Are Effective Reagents for the Imaging of Neurodegeneration". Brain Communications. 5 (2) fcad067. doi:10.1093/braincomms/fcad067. PMC 10120172. PMID 37091583.
