= Syncoilin =

Protein found in human muscles

SYNC

Identifiers
- Aliases: SYNC, SYNC1, SYNCOILIN, syncoilin, intermediate filament protein
- External IDs: OMIM: 611750; MGI: 1916078; GeneCards: SYNC

Gene location (Human)
Chr.	Chromosome 1 (human)
Band	1p35.1	Start	32,680,360 bp
Band	1p35.1	End	32,703,596 bp

Gene location (Mouse)
Chr.	Chromosome 4 (mouse)
Band	4 D2.2|4 63.26 cM	Start	129,181,410 bp
Band	4 D2.2|4 63.26 cM	End	129,202,352 bp
RNA expression pattern
Bgee	Human / Mouse (ortholog); Top expressed in: biceps brachii; Skeletal muscle tissue of rectus abdominis; Skeletal muscle tissue of biceps brachii; vastus lateralis muscle; gastrocnemius muscle; thoracic diaphragm; muscle of thigh; glutes; triceps brachii muscle; deltoid muscle / Top expressed in: lumbar spinal ganglion; ascending aorta; muscle of thigh; aortic valve; skeletal muscle tissue; temporal muscle; knee joint; esophagus; right ventricle; quadriceps femoris muscle; More reference expression data
BioGPS	n/a
Gene ontology
Molecular function	structural molecule activity
Cellular component	cytoplasm; perinuclear region of cytoplasm; cytosol; neuromuscular junction; sarcolemma; Z discdkac; intermediate filament
Biological process	intermediate filament-based process
Sources:Amigo / QuickGO
Orthologs
Databases	NCBI: entry; OMA: entry
Species	Human	Mouse
Entrez	81493	68828
Ensembl	ENSG00000162520	ENSMUSG00000001333
UniProt	Q9H7C4	Q9EPM5
RefSeq (mRNA)	NM_030786; NM_001161708	NM_023485
RefSeq (protein)	NP_001155180; NP_110413	NP_075974
Location (UCSC)	Chr 1: 32.68 – 32.7 Mb	Chr 4: 129.18 – 129.2 Mb
PubMed search
- Wikidata
View/Edit Human	View/Edit Mouse

Syncoilin (SYNC) is a protein that in humans is encoded by the gene SYNC. It acts as a muscle-specific atypical type III intermediate filament.

== Discovery ==
Syncoilin was first isolated as a binding partner to α-dystrobrevin, as determined by a yeast two-hybrid assay.

Later, a yeast two-hybrid method was used to demonstrate that syncoilin is a binding partner of desmin. These binding partners suggest that syncoilin acts as a mechanical "linker" between the sarcomere Z-disk (where desmin is localized) and the dystrophin-associated protein complex (where α-dystrobrevin is localized). However, the specific in vivo functions of syncoilin have not yet been determined.

Through the use of Western blotting techniques, a second species of syncoilin was found. This species was 55kDa in size, whereas the original species of syncoilin was 64kDa in size. This discovery inspired scientists to use gene splicing to identify two new isoforms called SYNC2 and SYNC3.

Abnormally high levels of syncoilin have been shown to be a characteristic of neuromuscular wasting diseases such as desminopathy and muscular dystrophy. Therefore, syncoilin is being explored as a promising marker of neuromuscular disease.

== Structure ==
Syncoilin is characterized as an intermediate filament and contains the key structural features that make up intermediate filaments such as a head region, linker regions, alpha helices, and a tail region. Each protein that is classified as an intermediate filament will vary in the size and shape of their head and tail regions.

More specifically, syncoilin is structurally defined by its central rod domain that forms a coil made up of 4 subunits, an α-helical region separated by flexible linkers, a N-terminal head domain, and a C-terminal tail domain. The isoform of syncoilin, SYNC 3, has a much different structure than the original protein filament. This isoform has a truncated rod domain and lacks a C-terminal tail region.

Because the tail of syncoilin is so short, it is hypothesized that this affects the ability of syncoilin to form other filaments. Syncoilin is different from other type III intermediate filaments because it has a unique N-terminal that is unlike any other protein. Syncoilin does not have the capability of forming dimers spontaneously like other filaments.

== Function ==
The most important job of syncoilin is to provide linkage between DAPC proteins and α-dystrobrevin. Studies have yet to determine if the binding of synacoilin to DAPC proteins and α-dystrobrevin occurs simultaneously. Syncoilin, like other intermediate filaments, is also necessary for the supporting the structure of the muscle fiber.

However, syncoilin does not serve the same function as most other intermediate filaments. It can be used in an attempt to fix muscle that has been damaged through up-regulation. Studies have shown that the upregulation of syncoilin is not just harmful to muscle fibers. Upregulation has also been proven to help with muscle membrane stability.

Hepatic stellate cells are a specialized tissue type in the body that require syncoilin intermediate filaments. When an injury occurs to the liver, expression of intermediate filaments such as syncoilin and an increase in α-smooth muscle cells (α-SMA). It is now used to help mark activated hepatic stellate cells after being identified in an experiment done on primary liver cells in mice. In this study, syncoilin isoforms SYNC1 and SYNC2 were highly expressed during in vivo activation of hepatic stellate cells.

== Location ==
Syncoilin is found in skeletal and cardiac muscle which is similar to its binding protein desmin. The region of skeletal muscle that houses most of the syncoilin is the sarcolemma. If the muscle tissue is dissected further into individual muscle fibers, it can be found on neuromuscular junctions. Syncoilin is also enriched in areas such as the perinuclear space and myotendinous junction. When there is a lack of either α-dystrobrevin or desmin, the expression of syncoilin is changed in order to compensate for the loss of one or both of the proteins.

In addition to another intermediate filament called peripherin, syncoilin can also be found in the central nervous system and the peripheral nervous system. The spinal cord is able to express variants of the original SYNC gene into two alternate isoforms called SYNC1 and SYNC2. However, SYNC1 and SYNC2 are dominant in different nervous systems. SYNC1 is more typically found in the brain and SYNC2 is typically found in the peripheral nervous system and spinal cord.

== Clinical significance ==
=== Muscular diseases ===
When skeletal and cardiac muscle contain increased levels of syncoilin, it can often lead to disease in the muscle tissue.

Examples of diseases that syncoilin has been linked to include:

- Duchenne muscular dystrophy
- Becker muscular dystrophy
- Central core disease
- Congenital muscular dystrophies
- Neurogenic disorder

Syncoilin strongly interacts with the filament, desmin, which suggests that a mutation in syncoilin might affect the bond between desmin and the sarcolemma. This may result in desmin-related myopathy. Another cause of muscular diseases is a mutation in the SYNC gene.

=== Gastric diseases ===
Mutations that affect syncoilin or a lack of syncoilin can be contributing factors that lead to cellular necrosis. The gene SYNC that identifies syncoilin was found to be expressed at higher levels in gastric cancer tissue than in regular gastric tissues. Within the gastric cancer tissues, the syncoilin was found primarily in the cytoplasm and the cell membrane. A recent study shows that gastric cancer tissues that have high SYNC expression reveal a strong correlation with low survival rates for the individual. More specifically, higher gene expression of SYNC in gastric cancer tissues suggests that the individual is at a more advanced stage of gastric cancer and a potentially more aggressive type subtype of gastric cancer.
