= NEFM =

Protein-coding gene in the species Homo sapiens

Identifiers
- Aliases: NEFM, NEF3, NF-M, NFM, neurofilament, medium polypeptide, neurofilament medium, neurofilament medium chain
- External IDs: OMIM: 162250; MGI: 97314; GeneCards: NEFM

Gene location (Human)
Chr.	Chromosome 8 (human)
Band	8p21.2	Start	24,913,758 bp
Band	8p21.2	End	24,919,098 bp

Gene location (Mouse)
Chr.	Chromosome 14 (mouse)
Band	14|14 D1	Start	68,320,039 bp
Band	14|14 D1	End	68,362,295 bp
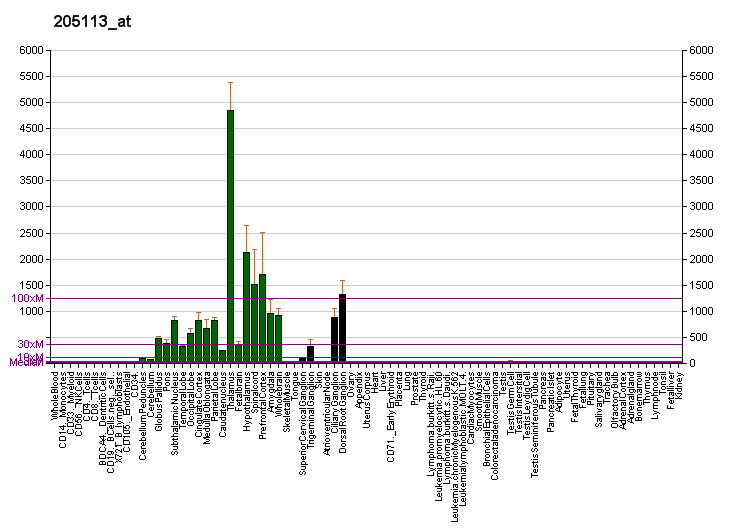
RNA expression pattern
Bgee	Human / Mouse (ortholog); Top expressed in: spinal ganglia; lateral nuclear group of thalamus; pons; middle temporal gyrus; Brodmann area 23; endothelial cell; superior vestibular nucleus; pars compacta; primary visual cortex; frontal pole / Top expressed in: anterior horn of spinal cord; superior cervical ganglion; deep cerebellar nuclei; facial motor nucleus; trigeminal ganglion; pontine nuclei; medial vestibular nucleus; dorsal tegmental nucleus; motor neuron; lateral geniculate nucleus; More reference expression data
BioGPS	More reference expression data
Gene ontology
Molecular function	microtubule binding; structural constituent of cytoskeleton; protein binding; structural molecule activity
Cellular component	neurofibrillary tangle; axon; intermediate filament; neurofilament; intermediate filament cytoskeleton
Biological process	neurofilament bundle assembly; axon development
Sources:Amigo / QuickGO
Orthologs
Databases	NCBI: entry; OMA: entry
Species	Human	Mouse
Entrez	4741	18040
Ensembl	ENSG00000104722	ENSMUSG00000022054
UniProt	P07197	P08553
RefSeq (mRNA)	NM_005382; NM_001105541	NM_008691
RefSeq (protein)	NP_001099011; NP_005373	NP_032717
Location (UCSC)	Chr 8: 24.91 – 24.92 Mb	Chr 14: 68.32 – 68.36 Mb
PubMed search
- Wikidata
View/Edit Human	View/Edit Mouse

Neurofilament medium polypeptide (NF-M) is a protein that in humans is encoded by the NEFM gene.

== Function ==
Neurofilaments are type IV intermediate filament heteropolymers composed of light (NEFL), medium (this protein), and heavy (NEFH) chains. Neurofilaments comprise the exoskeleton and functionally maintain neuronal caliber. They may also play a role in intracellular transport to axons and dendrites. This gene encodes the medium neurofilament protein. This protein is commonly used as a biomarker of neuronal damage.
