= Peripherin =

Protein-coding gene in the species Homo sapiens

PRPH

Identifiers
- Aliases: PRPH, NEF4, PRPH1, peripherin
- External IDs: OMIM: 170710; MGI: 97774; GeneCards: PRPH

Gene location (Human)
Chr.	Chromosome 12 (human)
Band	12q13.12	Start	49,293,252 bp
Band	12q13.12	End	49,298,686 bp

Gene location (Mouse)
Chr.	Chromosome 15 (mouse)
Band	15 F1|15 55.72 cM	Start	98,953,055 bp
Band	15 F1|15 55.72 cM	End	98,956,859 bp
RNA expression pattern
Bgee	Human / Mouse (ortholog); Top expressed in: spinal ganglia; trigeminal ganglion; sperm; left testis; right testis; muscle layer of sigmoid colon; gonad; testicle; optic nerve; sympathetic trunk / Top expressed in: trigeminal ganglion; superior cervical ganglion; facial motor nucleus; spinal ganglia; lumbar spinal ganglion; external carotid artery; motor neuron; superior surface of tongue; gallbladder; anterior horn of spinal cord; More reference expression data
BioGPS	n/a
Gene ontology
Molecular function	structural molecule activity; protein binding
Cellular component	type III intermediate filament; extracellular exosome; intermediate filament; membrane
Biological process	intermediate filament cytoskeleton organization
Sources:Amigo / QuickGO
Orthologs
Databases	NCBI: entry; OMA: entry
Species	Human	Mouse
Entrez	5630	19132
Ensembl	ENSG00000135406	ENSMUSG00000023484
UniProt	P41219	P15331
RefSeq (mRNA)	NM_006262	NM_001163588; NM_001163589; NM_013639
RefSeq (protein)	NP_006253	n/a
Location (UCSC)	Chr 12: 49.29 – 49.3 Mb	Chr 15: 98.95 – 98.96 Mb
PubMed search
- Wikidata
View/Edit Human	View/Edit Mouse

Peripherin is a type III intermediate filament protein expressed mainly in neurons of the peripheral nervous system. It is also found in neurons of the central nervous system that have projections toward peripheral structures, such as spinal motor neurons. Its size, structure, and sequence/location of protein motifs is similar to other type III intermediate filament proteins such as desmin, vimentin and glial fibrillary acidic protein. Like these proteins, peripherin can self-assemble to form homopolymeric filamentous networks (networks formed from peripherin protein dimers), but it can also heteropolymerize with neurofilaments in several neuronal types. This protein in humans is encoded by the PRPH gene. Peripherin is thought to play a role in neurite elongation during development and axonal regeneration after injury, but its exact function is unknown. It is also associated with some of the major neuropathologies that characterize amyotropic lateral sclerosis (ALS), but despite extensive research into how neurofilaments and peripherin contribute to ALS, their role in this disease is still unidentified.

== History ==
Peripherin, first named such in 1984, was also known as 57 kDa neuronal intermediate filament prior to 1990. In 1987, a second distinct peripherally located retinal rod protein was also given the name peripherin. To distinguish between the two, this second protein is referred to peripherin 2 or peripherin/RDS (retinal degeneration slow) for its location and role in retinal disease.

Peripherin was discovered as being the major intermediate filament in neuroblastoma cell lines and in rat pheochromocytoma cells.

== Gene ==
The complete sequence of the human (GenBank L14565), rat (GenBank M26232) and mouse (EMBL X59840) peripherin genes (PRPH) have been reported and complementary DNAs (cDNA) thus far described are those for rat, mouse and Xenopus peripherin. The use of a mouse cDNA probe during the in situ hybridization procedure allowed for the localization of the PRPH gene to the E-F region of mouse chromosome 15 and the q12-q13 region of human chromosome 12.

The overall structure of the peripherin gene is nine exons separated by eight introns. This configuration is conserved among the three known mammalian species with known coding for peripherin, namely human, rat and mouse. The nucleotide sequences of human and rat exons were 90% identical and produced a predicted protein that differed at only 18 of 475 amino acid residues. Comparison of introns 1 and 2 also yielded high homology of conserved segments. The 5' flanking regions and regulatory sequences were also very similar and a nerve growth factor negative regulatory element, a Hox protein (See Hox gene) binding site, and a heat shock element were found in all known peripherin genes.

=== Alternative splicing ===
An alternatively spliced mouse peripherin variant was identified that includes intron 4, a region that is spliced out of the abundant peripherin forms. Because of the change in reading frame, this variant produces a larger form of peripherin (Per61). In human peripherin, the inclusion of introns 3 and 4, regions that are similarly spliced out of the abundant peripherin protein forms, results in the generation of a truncated peripherin protein (Per28). In both cases, an antibody specific to a peptide coded by the intron regions stained the filamentous inclusions of in tissues affected by amyotrophic lateral sclerosis. These studies suggest that such alternative splicing could play a role in the disease and lend themselves to further investigation.

== Tissue distribution ==
Peripherin is widely expressed in the cell body and axons of neurons in the peripheral nervous system. These include small-sized root ganglion neurons, lower motor neurons, sensory and motor neurons of the cranial nerves, and autonomic neurons in ganglia and the enteric nervous system. It is also expressed in the central nervous system in a small set of brainstem and spinal cord neurons that have projections toward peripheral structures. Some of these structures include the hypothalamic magnocellular nuclei, pontine cholinergic nuclei, some cerebellar nuclei, and scattered neurons in the cerebral cortex. They can also be found in the ventral horn neurons and in the cholinergic laterodorsal tegmentum (LDT) and pedunculopontine tegmentum (PPT) nuclei.

A comparison of peripherin expression in the posterior and lateral hypothalamus in mice showed a sixty-fold higher expression in the posterior hypothalamus. This higher expression is due to the presence of peripherin in the tuberomammillary neurons of the mouse posterior hypothalamus.

== Structure ==
Peripherin is classified by gene structure and coding sequence as a type III intermediate filament protein because of its homology with vimentin, glial fibrillary acidic protein, and desmin. All intermediate filament proteins share a common secondary structure consisting of three main domains, the most conserved of which is the central α-helical rod domain. This central coil is capped by non-helical head (N-terminal) and tail (C-terminal) domains. The α-helical rod domain contains repeating segments of hydrophobic amino acids, such that the first and fourth residues of every set of seven amino acids are usually nonpolar. This specific structure enables two intermediate filament polypeptides to coil together and create a "hydrophobic seal". The rod also contains specific placement of alternating acidic and basic residues, many of which are spaced 4 amino acids apart. This spacing is optimal for the formation of ionic salt bridges, which serve to stabilize the α-helical rod through intrachain interactions. A switch from intrachain salt bridges to interchain ionic associations may assist in intermediate filament assembly by utilizing electrostatic interactions to stabilize coiled-coil dimers. The head and tail regions of intermediate filament proteins vary in length and amino acid composition, with greater variations in length occurring in the tail regions.

Peripherin, unlike keratin IFs, can self-assemble and exist as homopolymers (see polymer). They can also heteropolymerize, or co-assemble, with other type III proteins or the light neurofilament subunit (NF-L) to form intermediate filament networks. Type III proteins like peripherin can exist in different states within a cell. These states include nonfilamentous particles which combine to firm short IFs, or squiggles. These squiggles come together to form long IFs that make up cytoskeletal networks. Studies of network assembly in spreading fibroblasts and differentiating nerve cells show that particles move along microtubules in a kinesin and dynein-dependent manner, and as spreading continues, the particles polymerize into intermediate filaments.

In addition to the main species of peripherin, 57 kDa, two other forms have been identified in mice: Per 61 and Per 56. These two alternatives are both made by alternative splicing. Per 61 is created by introducing a 32 amino acid insertion within coil 2b of the α-helical rod domain of peripherin. Per 56 is made by a receptor on exon 9 of the peripherin gene transcript which induces a frameshift and replacement of a 21 amino acid sequence in the C-terminal found on the dominant 57 form with a new 8 amino acid sequence. The functions of these two alternative forms of peripherin are unknown. Per 57 and 56 are normally co-expressed, whereas Per 61 is not found in normal peripherin expression in adult motor neurons.

== Function ==
The diverse properties of intermediate filaments, compared with the conserved microtubule and actin filament proteins, could be responsible for the distinguishing molecular shapes of different cell types. In nerve cells, for example, the expressions of different types of IFs relates to the change in shape during development. Early stages of development in neurons is marked by the outgrowth of neurites and axons contributing to the cells asymmetric shape. During these transitions in cell shape, only homopolymer type III intermediate filaments, such as those with peripherin, are made. As the nerve cell matures, these type III IFs are replaced by more complex type IV neurofilaments expanding the diameter of axons in order to attain normal velocities of action potentials.

The exact function of peripherin is unknown. Expression of peripherin in development is greatest during the axonal growth phase and decreases postnatally, which suggests a role in neurite elongation and axonal guidance during development. Expression is also increased after axonal injury, such as peripheral axotomy in motor neurons and dorsal root ganglia. This upregulation implies that peripherin may also play a role in axon regeneration. However, experiments using peripherin depleted PC12 cells and peripherin knockout mice provide proof that the majority of neurons have no requirement of peripherin for axonal guidance and regrowth. PC12 cells lacking peripherin showed no defects in neurite outgrowth and peripherin knockout mice develop normally with no anatomical abnormalities or different phenotypes. In these experiments, peripherin deficiency did produce an upregulation of α-internexin, indicating the possibility that this type IV intermediate filament makes up for the loss of peripherin. Future studies of double knockout mice for both the peripherin and α-internexin genes might address this theory. However, while most peripherin knockout mice displayed normal neuron growth, its absence did affect development of a subset of unmyelinated sensory axons. In such mice, there was a "34% reduction in the number of L5 unmyelinated sensory fibers that correlated with a decreased binding of the lectin IB4."

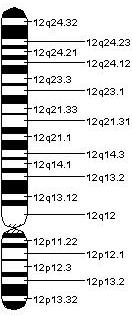
PRPH Localization PRPH is located on the q12-q13 region of the human chromosome 12.

== Regulation ==
Nerve growth factor (NGF) plays the major role in the regulation of peripherin. It is both a transcriptional inducer and post-translational regulator of peripherin expression in PC12 and neuroblastoma cells. The mechanism of NGF-induced activation occurs through 5' flanking elements and intragenic sequences involving the TATA box and other upstream elements as well as depression at a negative element. The specific signals regulating peripherin expression in vivo are unknown. The peripherin gene is transcriptionally activated in both small and large sized sensory neurons of the dorsal root ganglion at about day E10, and mRNA is present in these cells after postnatal day 2 and throughout adulthood. Post transcriptional mechanisms reduce detectable peripherin to only the small sized cells; however, crushing of the peripheral processes in dorsal root ganglion neurons lead to mRNA and detectable peripherin in the large sized cells.

The proinflammatory cytokines, interleukin-6 and leukemia inhibitory factor, can also induce peripherin expression through the JAK-STAT signaling pathway. This specific upregulation is linked to neuronal regeneration.

== Clinical significance ==
Peripherin may be involved in the pathology of insulin-dependent diabetes mellitus (or diabetes mellitus type 1) in animals; however, no direct linkage has been found in human patients. In a nonobese diabetic mouse model, peripherin has been found as a known autoantigen (See antigen). B cell clones reactive to peripherin have also been found in early stages of the disease. Since peripherin is expressed in both the peripheral nervous system and, in young animals, by islet beta cells, it is possible that the destruction of both peripheral nervous system elements and islet β-cells in insulin-dependent diabetes mellitus is due to the immune response to autoreactive peripherin.

Peripherin can also play a role in the definitive diagnosis of Hirschsprung disease. Patients suspected of having the disease undergo rectal biopsy to look for the presence or absence of ganglion cells. However, the identification of these cells can be very difficult, especially in newborns where immature ganglion cells are easily confused with endothelial, mesenchyme and inflammatory cells. To aid in identification, a protocol utilizing peripherin and S-100 immunohistochemistry staining was developed to assist in the recognition of ganglion cells in rectal biopsies.

=== Mutations ===
Experiments examining peripherin overexpression in mice have suggested that PRPH mutations play a role in the pathogenesis of amyotrophic lateral sclerosis, with more recent studies investigating the prevalence of such mutations in humans. Though many polymorphic variants of PRPH exist, two variants of PRPH were seen uniquely in patients with ALS, both of which consisted of a frameshift mutation. In the first variant, a single base pair deletion in exon 1 of PRPH was predictive of a peripherin species truncated to 85 amino acids. This truncation negatively impacted the ability of the neurofilament network to assemble, thus suggesting that mutations in PRPH may play a role in at least a small percentage of human cases of amyotrophic lateral sclerosis.

The second variant consisted of an amino acid substitution from aspartate to tyrosine as a result of a single point mutation in exon 1. This was also shown to adversely affect the assembly of the neurofilament network. The PRPH mutations observed in amyotrophic lateral sclerosis cause a change in the 3D structure of the protein. Consequently, the mutant peripherin forms aggregates instead of the filamentous network that it usually forms.

=== Amyotrophic lateral sclerosis ===
Protein and neurofilamentous aggregates are characteristic of patients with amyotrophic lateral sclerosis, a progressive, fatal neurodegenerative disease. Spheroids, specifically, which are protein aggregates of neuronal intermediate filaments, have been found in patients with amyotrophic lateral sclerosis. Peripherin has been found in such spheroids in conjunction with other neurofilaments in other neuronal diseases, thus suggesting that peripherin may play a role in the pathogenesis of amyotrophic lateral sclerosis.

=== As a therapeutic target ===
Possible involvement of intermediate filaments such as peripherin in neurodegenerative diseases is currently being investigated. Interactions between intermediate filaments and other proteins are also being pursued. Peripherin has been shown to associate with protein kinase Cε, inducing its aggregation and leading to increased apoptosis. It may be possible to regulate this aggregation and apoptosis using siRNAs and protein kinase Cε. Pinpointing the source and possible resolution of protein aggregates is a promising direction for potential therapeutics.
