= Central chromatolysis =

Pathologic finding in microscopy

Micrograph of the anterior horn of the spinal cord showing motor neurons with central chromatolysis. H&E stain.

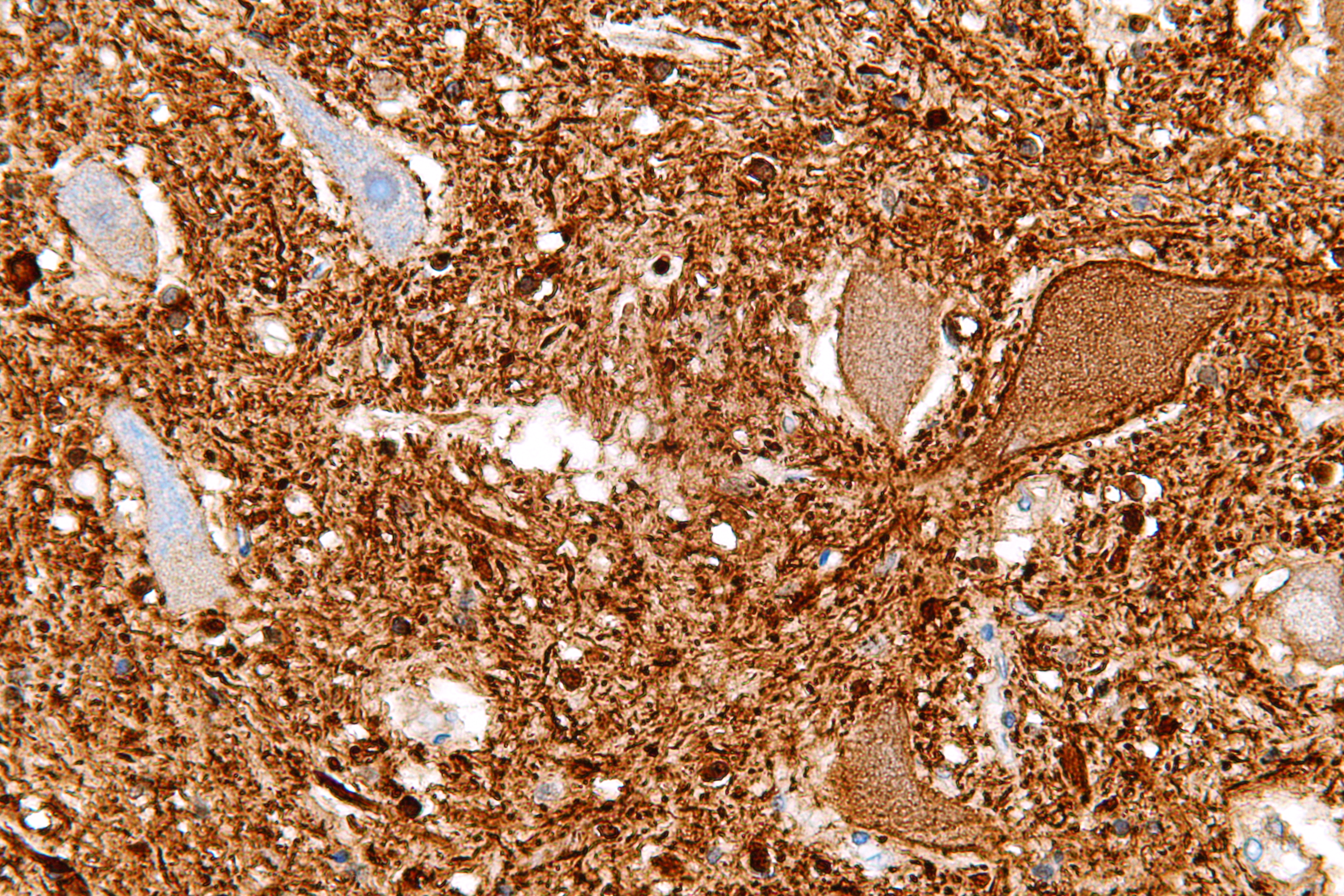
Micrograph of the anterior horn of the spinal cord showing motor neurons with central chromatolysis. Neurofilament immunostain.

Central chromatolysis is a histopathologic change seen in the cell body of a neuron, where the chromatin and cell nucleus are pushed to the cell periphery, in response to axonal injury. This response is associated with increased protein synthesis to accommodate for axonal sprouting. In addition to traumatic injuries, central chromatolysis may be caused by vitamin deficiency (pellagra).

== See also ==
- Motor neuron
