= Internexin =

Protein

Internexin neuronal intermediate filament protein, alpha

Identifiers
- Symbol: INA
- Alt. symbols: NEF5
- NCBI gene: 9118
- HGNC: 6057
- OMIM: 605338
- RefSeq: NM_032727
- UniProt: Q16352

Other data
- Locus: Chr. 10 q24
Search for
- Structures: Swiss-model
- Domains: InterPro

Internexin, alpha-internexin, is a Class IV intermediate filament approximately 66 kDa. The protein was originally purified from rat optic nerve and spinal cord. The protein copurifies with other neurofilament subunits, as it was originally discovered, however in some mature neurons it can be the only neurofilament expressed. The protein is present in developing neuroblasts and in the central nervous system of adults. The protein is a major component of the intermediate filament network in small interneurons and cerebellar granule cells, where it is present in the parallel fibers.

== Structure ==
Alpha-internexin has a homologous central rod domain of approximately 310 amino acid residues that form a highly conserved alpha helical region. The central rod domain is responsible for coiled-coil structure and is flanked by an amino terminal head region and a carboxy terminal tail. This rod domain is also involved in the 10 nm filament assembly structure. The head and tail regions contain segments that are highly homologous to the NF-M's structure. The head region is highly basic and contains many serine and threonine polymers while the tail region has distinct sequence motifs like a glutamate rich region. The alpha domain is composed of heptad repeats of hydrophobic residues that aid the formation of a coiled coil structure. The structure of Alpha-internexin is highly conserved between rats, mice and humans.

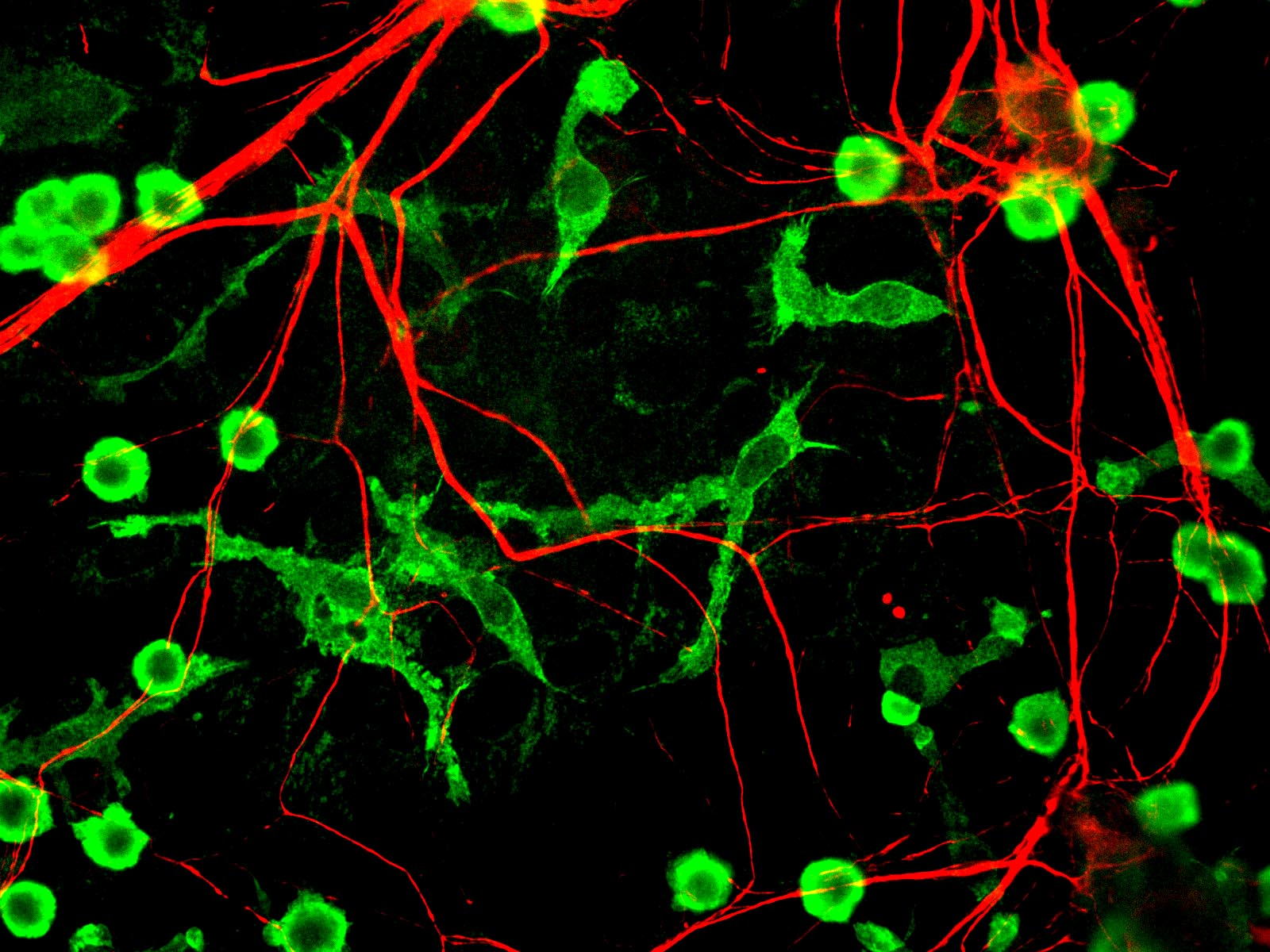
Mixed neuron/glial cultures from p18 rat embryo brain stained with antibody to alpha-internexin which reveals, in red, neuronal processes and cell bodies. Cells were also labelled in green for Coronin 1a, a marker for microglia.

Alpha-internexin can form homopolymers, unlike the heteropolymer the neurofilaments form. This formation suggests that α-internexin and the three neurofilaments form separate filament systems. Not only can alpha-internexin form homopolymers but it form a network of extended filaments in the absence of other intermediate filament proteins and efficiently co-assemble with any type IV or type III subunit, in vitro. In Ching et al., a model of the intermediate filaments assembly is proposed. This model includes the following steps:

- Step 1: in the first step of IF assembly two parallel, unstaggered intermediate filament polypeptides chains form a dimer via their a-helical rod domains; these dimers can be either homodimers or heterodimers.
- Step 2: the dimers may associate laterally to form antiparallel, unstaggered tetramers or antiparallel, staggered tetramers.
- Step 3: the dimers may also associate longitudinally with a short head-to-tail overlap of the a-helical rod domains.
- Step 4: these lateral and longitudinal associations lead to the formation of protofibrils (octamers) and ultimately 10 nm intermediate filaments.

The close connection between the neurofilament triplet proteins and α-internexin is quite obvious. α-internexin is functionally interdependent with the neurofilament triplet proteins. If one genetically deletes NF-M and/or NF-H in mice, the transport and presence, in the axons of the Central Nervous System, of α-internexin will be drastically reduced. Not only are they functionally similar, the turnover rates are also similar among the four proteins.

== Function and expression ==
It is expressed in early development in the neuroblast along with α-internexin and peripherin. As development continues into neurons the neurofilament triplet proteins (NF-L: neurofilament low molecular mass, NF-M: neurofilament medium molecular mass, and NF-H: neurofilament high molecular mass) are expressed in increasing molecular mass order as α-internexin expression decreases. In the neuroblast phase of development α-internexin is found in the neural tube and neural crest derived neuroblasts.

In adult cells, α-internexin is expressed abundantly in the central nervous system, in the cytoplasm of neurons, along with the neurofilament triplet proteins. They are expressed in a relatively fixed stoichiometric ratio to neurofilaments.

Alpha-internexin is a brain and central nervous system filament that is involved in neuronal development and has been suggested to play a role in axonal outgrowth. Gefiltin and xefiltin, homologs of α-internexin in zebrafish and Xenopus laevis, respectively, are highly expressed during retinal growth and optic axon regeneration and therefore have aided the speculation that α-internexin and axonal outgrowth may be connected. With this speculation, studies have been performed to develop a stronger bridge between the two. Through knockout studies using mice, the inhibition of α-internexin had no visible effect on development of the nervous system which suggests that axonal outgrowth is unaffected by α-internexin, however, the knockout study failed to rule out subtle differences that the protein may have caused. Not only has α-internexin been linked to axonal outgrowth but it may regulate axonal stability or diameter through changes in filaments and their subunit composition. Also, internexin could be involved in the maintenance or the formation of dendritic spines. There have been many implications as to the function of α-internexin, but no concrete evidence currently exists to fully support or negate these speculations.

== Disease associations ==
α-internexin has also been implicated in several degenerative diseases such as Alzheimer's disease, amyotrophic lateral sclerosis, dementia with Lewy bodies, Parkinson's disease, neuropathies, tropical spastic paraparesis(a HTLV-1 associated myelopathy). In HTLV-1 myelopathy, Tax, transactivator expressed by HTLV-1, interacts with α-internexin in cell culture resulting in dramatic reduction in Tax transcactivation and intermediate filament formation.

== See also ==
- Neurofilaments
- Intermediate filament
