= NEFH =

Protein-coding gene in the species Homo sapiens

Identifiers
- Aliases: NEFH, NFH, CMT2CC, neurofilament, heavy polypeptide, neurofilament heavy, neurofilament heavy chain
- External IDs: OMIM: 162230; MGI: 97309; GeneCards: NEFH

Gene location (Human)
Chr.	Chromosome 22 (human)
Band	22q12.2	Start	29,480,218 bp
Band	22q12.2	End	29,491,390 bp

Gene location (Mouse)
Chr.	Chromosome 11 (mouse)
Band	11 A1|11 3.12 cM	Start	4,888,754 bp
Band	11 A1|11 3.12 cM	End	4,898,064 bp
RNA expression pattern
Bgee	Human / Mouse (ortholog); Top expressed in: spinal ganglia; pons; lateral nuclear group of thalamus; Brodmann area 23; pars compacta; pars reticulata; superior vestibular nucleus; external globus pallidus; trigeminal ganglion; endothelial cell / Top expressed in: anterior horn of spinal cord; facial motor nucleus; motor neuron; pontine nuclei; deep cerebellar nuclei; medial vestibular nucleus; lateral geniculate nucleus; dorsal tegmental nucleus; medial geniculate nucleus; central gray substance of midbrain; More reference expression data
BioGPS	n/a
Gene ontology
Molecular function	protein-macromolecule adaptor activity; microtubule binding; structural molecule activity; structural constituent of cytoskeleton; kinesin binding; protein kinase binding; dynein complex binding; structural constituent of postsynaptic intermediate filament cytoskeleton
Cellular component	neurofilament; neurofibrillary tangle; myelin sheath; axon; mitochondrion; intermediate filament; cytoplasm; postsynaptic density; cytoskeleton; Schaffer collateral - CA1 synapse; postsynaptic intermediate filament cytoskeleton
Biological process	axon development; intermediate filament bundle assembly; axonogenesis; neurofilament bundle assembly; cell projection assembly; regulation of organelle transport along microtubule; intermediate filament cytoskeleton organization; peripheral nervous system neuron axonogenesis; neurofilament cytoskeleton organization; microtubule cytoskeleton organization; cellular response to leukemia inhibitory factor; postsynaptic intermediate filament cytoskeleton organization
Sources:Amigo / QuickGO
Orthologs
Databases	NCBI: entry; OMA: entry
Species	Human	Mouse
Entrez	4744	380684
Ensembl	ENSG00000100285	ENSMUSG00000020396
UniProt	P12036	P19246
RefSeq (mRNA)	NM_021076	NM_010904
RefSeq (protein)	NP_066554	NP_035034
Location (UCSC)	Chr 22: 29.48 – 29.49 Mb	Chr 11: 4.89 – 4.9 Mb
PubMed search
- Wikidata
View/Edit Human	View/Edit Mouse

Neurofilament, heavy polypeptide (NEFH) is a protein that in humans is encoded by the NEFH gene.

It is the gene for a heavy protein subunit that is combined with medium and light subunits to make neurofilaments, which form the framework for nerve cells.

Mutations in the NEFH gene are associated with Charcot-Marie-Tooth disease.
