= Desmin =

Mammalian protein found in humans

DES

Identifiers
- Aliases: DES, CSM1, CSM2, LGMD2R, desmin, LGMD1D, CMD1F, CDCD3, LGMD1E
- External IDs: OMIM: 125660; MGI: 94885; GeneCards: DES

Gene location (Human)
Chr.	Chromosome 2 (human)
Band	2q35	Start	219,418,377 bp
Band	2q35	End	219,426,734 bp

Gene location (Mouse)
Chr.	Chromosome 1 (mouse)
Band	1 C4|1 38.85 cM	Start	75,336,973 bp
Band	1 C4|1 38.85 cM	End	75,345,223 bp
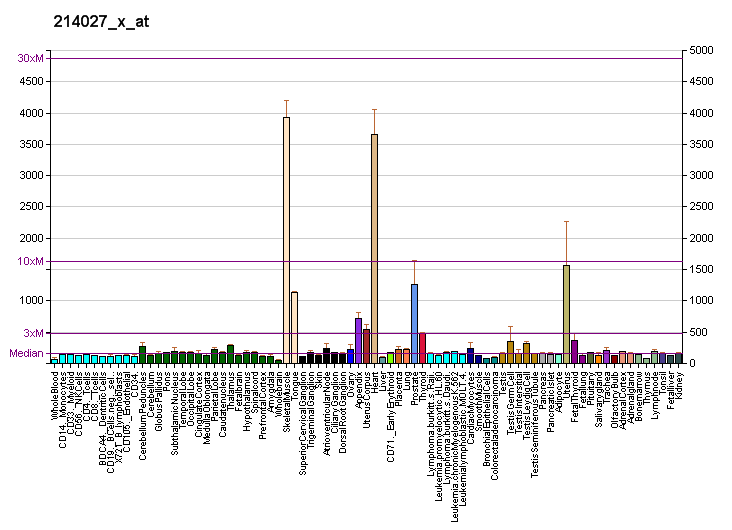

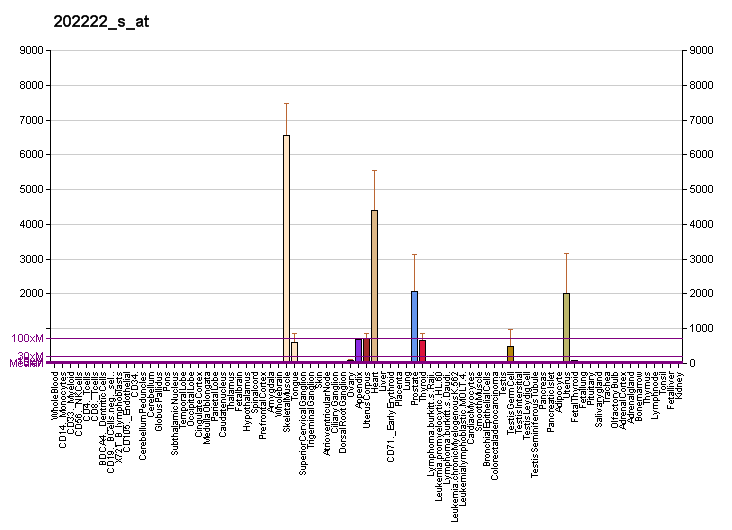
RNA expression pattern
Bgee	Human / Mouse (ortholog); Top expressed in: saphenous vein; apex of heart; gastrocnemius muscle; muscle of thigh; gastric mucosa; right auricle of heart; left ventricle; myocardium of left ventricle; thoracic diaphragm; muscle layer of sigmoid colon / Top expressed in: muscle of thigh; gastrula; ankle; triceps brachii muscle; temporal muscle; esophagus; medial head of gastrocnemius muscle; digastric muscle; sternocleidomastoid muscle; decidua; More reference expression data
BioGPS	More reference expression data
Gene ontology
Molecular function	protein binding; structural constituent of cytoskeleton; identical protein binding; structural molecule activity; cytoskeletal protein binding
Cellular component	intercalated disc; sarcolemma; intermediate filament cytoskeleton; cytoplasm; contractile fiber; cytosol; neuromuscular junction; membrane; Z discdkac; plasma membrane; fascia adherens; cytoskeleton; extracellular exosome; intermediate filament; cell-cell junction; cardiac myofibril; nucleus
Biological process	muscle contraction; intermediate filament organization; cytoskeleton organization; muscle filament sliding; regulation of heart contraction
Sources:Amigo / QuickGO
Orthologs
Databases	NCBI: entry; OMA: entry
Species	Human	Mouse
Entrez	1674	13346
Ensembl	ENSG00000175084	ENSMUSG00000026208
UniProt	P17661	P31001
RefSeq (mRNA)	NM_001927	NM_010043
RefSeq (protein)	NP_001918; NP_001369637; NP_001369638; NP_001369639; NP_001369640 NP_001369641; NP_001369642	NP_034173
Location (UCSC)	Chr 2: 219.42 – 219.43 Mb	Chr 1: 75.34 – 75.35 Mb
PubMed search
- Wikidata
View/Edit Human	View/Edit Mouse

Desmin is a protein that in humans is encoded by the DES gene. Desmin is a muscle-specific, type III intermediate filament that integrates the sarcolemma, Z disk, and nuclear membrane in sarcomeres and regulates sarcomere architecture.

== Structure ==
Desmin is a 53.5 kDa protein composed of 470 amino acids, encoded by the human DES gene located on the long arm of chromosome 2. There are three major domains to the desmin protein: a conserved alpha helix rod, a variable non alpha helix head, and a carboxy-terminal tail. Desmin, as all intermediate filaments, shows no polarity when assembled. The rod domain consists of 308 amino acids with parallel alpha helical coiled coil dimers and three linkers to disrupt it. The rod domain connects to the head domain. The head domain 84 amino acids with many arginine, serine, and aromatic residues is important in filament assembly and dimer-dimer interactions. The tail domain is responsible for the integration of filaments and interaction with proteins and organelles. Desmin is only expressed in vertebrates, however homologous proteins are found in many organisms. Desmin is a subunit of intermediate filaments in cardiac muscle, skeletal muscle and smooth muscle tissue. In cardiac muscle, desmin is present in Z-discs and intercalated discs. Desmin has been shown to interact with desmoplakin and αB-crystallin.

== Function ==
Desmin was first described in 1976, first purified in 1977, the gene was cloned in 1989, and the first knockout mouse was created in 1996. The function of desmin has been deduced through studies in knockout mice. Desmin is one of the earliest protein markers for muscle tissue in embryogenesis as it is detected in the somites. Although it is present early in the development of muscle cells, it is only expressed at low levels, and increases as the cell nears terminal differentiation. A similar protein, vimentin, is present in higher amounts during embryogenesis while desmin is present in higher amounts after differentiation. This suggests that there may be some interaction between the two in determining muscle cell differentiation. However desmin knockout mice develop normally and only experience defects later in life. Since desmin is expressed at a low level during differentiation another protein may be able to compensate for desmin's function early in development but not later on.

In adult desmin-null mice, hearts from 10 week-old animals showed drastic alterations in muscle architecture, including a misalignment of myofibrils and disorganization and swelling of mitochondria; findings that were more severe in cardiac relative to skeletal muscle. Cardiac tissue also exhibited progressive necrosis and calcification of the myocardium. A separate study examined this in more detail in cardiac tissue and found that murine hearts lacking desmin developed hypertrophic cardiomyopathy and chamber dilation combined with systolic dysfunction. In adult muscle, desmin forms a scaffold around the Z-disk of the sarcomere and connects the Z-disk to the subsarcolemmal cytoskeleton. It links the myofibrils laterally by connecting the Z-disks. Through its connection to the sarcomere, desmin connects the contractile apparatus to the cell nucleus, mitochondria, and post-synaptic areas of motor endplates. These connections maintain the structural and mechanical integrity of the cell during contraction while also helping in force transmission and longitudinal load bearing.

In human heart failure, desmin expression is upregulated, which has been hypothesized to be a defense mechanism in an attempt to maintain normal sarcomere alignment amidst disease pathogenesis. There is some evidence that desmin may also connect the sarcomere to the extracellular matrix (ECM) through desmosomes which could be important in signalling between the ECM and the sarcomere which could regulate muscle contraction and movement. Finally, desmin may be important in mitochondria function. When desmin is not functioning properly there is improper mitochondrial distribution, number, morphology and function. Since desmin links the mitochondria to the sarcomere it may transmit information about contractions and energy need and through this regulate the aerobic respiration rate of the muscle cell.

== Clinical significance ==
Desmin-related myofibrillar myopathy (DRM or desminopathy) is a subgroup of the myofibrillar myopathy diseases and is the result of a mutation in the gene that codes for desmin which by changing the protein structure prevents it from forming protein filaments, and rather, forms aggregates of desmin and other proteins throughout the cell. Desmin (DES) mutations have been associated with restrictive, dilated, idiopathic, arrhythmogenic and non-compaction cardimyopathy. Even within the same family the observed cardiac phenotype could be broad and diverse. The N-terminal part of the 1A desmin subdomain is a genetic hot spot region for mutations affecting filament assembly. Some of these DES mutations cause an aggregation of desmin within the cytoplasm. Some mutations, like p.A120D or p.R127P, were discovered in families, where several members had sudden cardiac death. In addition, DES mutations cause frequently cardiac conduction diseases.

Desmin has been evaluated for role in assessing the depth of invasion of urothelial carcinoma in TURBT specimens.
