= Sex linkage =

Sex-specific patterns of inheritance

Sex linkage describes the sex-specific patterns of inheritance and presentation when a gene mutation (allele) is present on a sex chromosome (allosome) rather than a non-sex chromosome (autosome). In humans, these are termed X-linked recessive, X-linked dominant and Y-linked. The inheritance and presentation of all three differ depending on the sex of both the parent and the child. This makes them characteristically different from autosomal dominance and recessiveness.

There are many more X-linked conditions than Y-linked conditions, since humans have several times as many genes on the X chromosome than the Y chromosome. Only females are able to be carriers for X-linked conditions; males will always be affected by any X-linked condition, since they have no second X chromosome with a healthy copy of the gene. As such, X-linked recessive conditions affect males much more commonly than females.

In X-linked recessive inheritance, a son born to a carrier mother and an unaffected father has a 50% chance of being affected, while a daughter has a 50% chance of being a carrier, however a fraction of carriers may display a milder (or even full) form of the condition due to a phenomenon known as skewed X-inactivation, in which the normal process of inactivating half of the female body's X chromosomes preferably targets a certain parent's X chromosome (the father's in this case). If the father is affected, the son will not be affected, as he does not inherit the father's X chromosome, but the daughter will always be a carrier (and may occasionally present with symptoms due to aforementioned skewed X-inactivation).

In X-linked dominant inheritance, a son or daughter born to an affected mother and an unaffected father both have a 50% chance of being affected (though a few X-linked dominant conditions are embryonic lethal for the son, making them appear to only occur in females). If the father is affected, the son will always be unaffected, but the daughter will always be affected.

A Y-linked condition will only be inherited from father to son and will always affect every generation.

The inheritance patterns are different in animals that use sex-determination systems other than XY. In the ZW sex-determination system used by birds, the mammalian pattern is reversed, since the male is the homogametic sex (ZZ) and the female is heterogametic (ZW).

== Background ==
In humans (and mammals in general), biological sex is determined by genetics. However this is not the case for all organisms. For instance, the biological sex of select reptiles is environmentally determined, and the sex of select worms is dependent on location.

22 of the 23 pairs of human chromosomes are autosomal (not involved in sex determination), while the 23rd pair of human chromosomes are the sex chromosomes. The possession of two X-chromosomes defines a biological female, while the possession of one X and one Y chromosome defines a biological male. The two sex chromosomes differ in size and gene content, and unlike the sets of autosomal chromosomes, are not homologous. The X-chromosome contains an estimated 1400 genes, most of which are involved in tissue development and the development of human disorders. The Y-chromosome is host to the SRY gene, which is involved in the development of several male sex characteristics, while the identified functions of many of the remaining approximately 200 genes on the Y-chromosome are associated with human disease. Sex linkage thus refers to the association of a trait encoded by one of the genes on these sex chromosomes. There are many more X-linked conditions than Y-linked conditions due to the larger size of the X-chromosome and greater number of genes encoded within it.

In classical genetics, a mating experiment called a reciprocal cross is performed to test if an animal's trait is sex-linked.

== X-linked patterns of inheritance ==
A disease or trait determined by a gene on the X-chromosome demonstrates X-linked inheritance. Historically, X-linked inheritance has been divided into the patterns of X-linked dominant inheritance and X-linked recessive inheritance as synonymous with classical Mendelian inheritance of genes on autosomal chromosomes. However, more recently scholars have suggested the discontinuation of the use of the terms dominant and recessive when referring to X-linked inheritance, stating that the highly variable penetrance of X-linked traits in females as a result of mechanisms such as skewed X-inactivation or somatic mosaicism is difficult to reconcile with standard definitions of dominance and recessiveness.

(A)	(B)	(C)

Illustration of some X-linked heredity outcomes (A) the affected father has one X-linked dominant allele, the mother is homozygous for the recessive allele: only daughters (all) will be affected. (B) the affected mother is heterozygous with one copy of the X-linked dominant allele: both daughters and sons will have 50% probability to be affected. (C) the heterozygous mother is called "carrier" because she has one copy of the recessive allele: sons will have 50% probability to be affected, 50% of unaffected daughters will become carriers like their mother.

== X-linked dominant inheritance ==
The phenotype of an X-linked dominant trait is exhibited by both males and females, and requires only one copy of the affected allele.

X-linked dominant inheritance is the pattern by which a trait encoded by an allele on the X-chromosome is passed down through generations, wherefore only one copy of that allele is sufficient for an individual to be affected (dominance). Unlike with X-linked recessive traits, females are more often affected by X-linked dominant traits than males as females have two X-chromosomes as opposed to one. Moreover, some X-linked dominant conditions (for example, Aicardi syndrome) are embryonically or neonatally lethal in hemizygous males (XY), and thus can be seen to only affect heterozygous females, who experience less severe symptoms.

=== Frequency and patterns of inheritance ===
In X-linked dominant inheritance, the transmission of the gene depends on the genotype of each of the parents. A mother heterozygous for an X-linked dominant trait will be affected, and half of her children (whether female or male) will inherit her affected X-chromosome and be affected themselves, assuming an unaffected father. Of the children of a father affected by an X-linked dominant trait and an unaffected mother, all daughters will be affected (having inherited their father's only affected X-chromosome), while no sons will be affected (having received their father's Y-chromosome). A child affected by an X-linked dominant condition will always have at least one affected parent, and an affected son will always have an affected mother.

== X-linked recessive inheritance ==
In X-linked recessive inheritance, males can only inherit the trait from the mother, and females can be carriers as a result of a carrier mother or affected father.

X-linked recessive inheritance describes one of the patterns of inheritance of genetic traits or disorders encoded by an allele (version of a gene) situated on the X-chromosome. In X-linked recessive inheritance, females (XX) must have two copies of the allele (homozygous), while males (XY) require only one copy of the allele (hemizygous) to display the phenotype. Thus, it is far more common for males to be affected by X-linked recessive traits.

A female heterozygous for an X-linked recessive trait is considered a carrier. While a carrier female most often does not display the phenotype, rare cases of skewed X-chromosome inactivation, can lead to varied levels of expression. This would occur when, during the normal process of inactivating half of a female's X-chromosomes, inactivation preferentially targets X-chromosomes inherited from a single parent, thus the remaining active X-chromosomes from the other parent are disproportionately expressed.

There are characteristic patterns for X-linked recessive inheritance. As each parent contributes one sex chromosome to their offspring, sons cannot receive the X-linked trait from affected fathers, who provide only a Y-chromosome. Consequently, affected males must inherit the X-linked recessive trait from their mothers. Sons of a healthy carrier female have a 50% change of being affected, while sons of an affected female will always be affected. Females must inherit a X-linked recessive allele from each parent. All daughters of an affected father and healthy non-carrier mother will be carriers. Daughters of an affected father and carrier mother will have a 50% chance of being affected, and daughters of two affected parents will always be affected. While there is no male-to-male transmission of X-linked recessive traits, an affected male can pass his recessive X allele to a grandson through his unaffected carrier daughter.

== X-linked diseases ==
=== X-linked dominant diseases ===
- Aicardi syndrome
- Alport syndrome (majority of cases)
- Coffin–Lowry syndrome (CLS)
- Fragile-X syndrome
- Goltz syndrome
- Idiopathic hypoparathyroidism
- Incontinentia pigmenti
- Porphyria (2-10% of cases)
- Rett syndrome (5% of cases)
- Vitamin D resistant rickets (X-linked hypophosphatemia)

==== Alport syndrome ====
Alport syndrome is a genetic disorder that primarily affects the kidneys by damaging the glomeruli, which are tiny filtering units inside the kidneys.It is caused by inherited mutations in the COL4A3, COL4A4, and COL4A5 genes, which are responsible for producing type IV collagen. These mutations disrupt the formation of basement membranes, particularly in the kidneys, inner ears, and eyes, where this collagen network plays a key structural role. The specific gene affected determines the form of Alport syndrome: mutations in COL4A5 cause the X-linked form (XLAS), while mutations in COL4A3 or COL4A4, located on chromosome 2, are associated with autosomal recessive (ARAS) or autosomal dominant (ADAS) forms.

Common signs and symptoms of Alport syndrome include hematuria (blood in urine), proteinuria (protein in urine), hearing loss, and eye abnormalities.

Diagnosis typically involves urine and blood tests, hearing and vision assessments, and genetic testing to confirm the mutation and identify the specific type of Alport syndrome. Kidney biopsy can reveal a characteristic 'basketweave' appearance of the glomerular basement membrane under electron microscopy. In some cases, skin or kidney tissue may be tested for the absence of type IV collagen proteins. Genetic testing is especially useful when biopsy is inconclusive or unavailable.

While there is no cure, treatments focus on slowing the progression of the kidney disease and managing symptoms. ACE inhibitors are commonly used to control blood pressure and reduce proteinuria. If kidney failure develops, dialysis or kidney transplant is often effective. Rarely, transplant recipients may develop anti-GBM disease due to antibodies against type IV collagen.

==== Fragile X syndrome ====
Fragile X syndrome is a genetic neurodevelopmental disorder caused by a CGG trinucleotide repeat expansion in the FMR1 gene on the X chromosome. It is inherited in an X-linked dominant pattern and is the most common known inherited genetic cause of autism spectrum disorder. The condition affects approximately 1 in 3,600 males and 1 in 4,000 to 6,000 females.

Fragile X syndrome occurs when the CGG repeat expansion exceeds 200 repeats, causing methylation and silencing of the FMR1 gene. This leads to a deficiency of FMRP, a protein essential for normal synaptic development and brain plasticity.

Fragile X syndrome typically presents with learning disabilities to severe intellectual impairment, along with distinct physical features such as a long face, large or protruding ears, flat feet, and low muscle tone. Many individuals, especially males, also exhibit behavioural traits including social anxiety, hyperactivity, hand-flapping, and self-injurious behaviors such as biting. Females, who have two X chromosomes, are generally less severely affected due to X-inactivation.

Diagnosis typically involves identifying a mutation in the FMR1 gene using polymerase chain reaction (PCR) and Southern blot analysis to measure CGG repeat expansions and methylation status. Earlier cytogenetic methods, such as detecting "fragile sites" on the X chromosome, have largely been replaced due to low reliability, particularly in females. Early diagnosis is important to support timely intervention and genetic counseling.

==== Rett syndrome ====
Rett syndrome is a severe neurodevelopmental disorder that primarily affects females, with a prevalence of approximately 1 in 8,500. It is caused by mutations in the MECP2 gene located on the X chromosome and is inherited in an X-linked dominant pattern. However, the vast majority (over 99%) of cases result from de novo mutations, often from the paternal germline.

Following a period of seemingly normal development, Rett syndrome progresses through four clinical stages. Stage I, or early-onset, typically begins between 6 and 18 months of age with subtle developmental delays. Stage II, the rapid destructive phase, involves a sudden loss of purposeful hand use and spoken language, often accompanied by repetitive hand movements, breathing irregularities, and autistic-like behaviours. In Stage III, or the plateau phase, some behavioural improvements may occur, though motor dysfunction, apraxia, and seizures remain common. Stage IV, the late motor deterioration phase, is characterized by progressive loss of mobility and muscle rigidity, while communication and cognition generally stabilize.

The condition is rarely seen in males, as those with MECP2 mutations typically do not survive infancy unless they have Klinefelter's syndrome or mosaicism. In contrast, affected females often survive into middle age, with symptom severity influenced by the specific mutation and patterns of X-chromosome inactivation.

Diagnosis is based on clinical presentation and confirmed through genetic testing for MECP2 mutations once the established diagnostic criteria are met. While there is no cure, treatment focuses on managing symptoms with physical and speech therapy, medications for seizures, and supportive care. In 2023, trofinetide became the first medication approved in the United States specifically for Rett syndrome.

==== X-linked hypophosphatemia (vitamin D resistant rickets) ====
X-linked hypophosphatemia is a rare genetic form of rickets caused by mutations in the PHEX gene on the X chromosome. Unlike nutritional rickets, X-linked hypophosphatemia does not respond to vitamin D supplements. Instead, the PHEX mutation leads to overproduction of the hormone FGF23, which causes the kidneys to waste phosphate and impairs bone mineralization. Reduced PHEX enzyme activity allows the accumulation of osteopontin, a mineralization-inhibiting protein, to accumulate in bones and teeth. These combined effects result in soft bones (osteomalacia), dental issues (odontomalacia), short stature, and bow-leggedness. The condition affects approximately 1 in 20,000.

Symptoms vary by age. In children, common signs include rickets, fatigue, delayed growth, craniostenosis (premature fusion of skull bones), and more. Adults may experience osteomalacia (soft bones), fractures or pseudofractures, dental abscesses, hearing loss, and joint pain.

Diagnosis is based on clinical and biochemical findings, including low serum phosphate, elevated alkaline phosphatase, and excessive urinary phosphate loss.

Treatment has traditionally included phosphate supplements and active vitamin D analogs. More recently, burosumab, a monoclonal antibody that targets FGF23, has been approved and shown to normalize phosphate levels and improve skeletal outcomes in both children and adults.

=== X-linked recessive diseases ===
The incidence of X-linked recessive conditions in females is the square of that in males. For example, if 1 in 20 males in a human population are red–green color blind, then 1 in 400 females in the population are expected to be color-blind (^{1}/_{20})*(^{1}/_{20}). Examples include:

- Aarskog–Scott syndrome
- Adrenoleukodystrophy
- Bruton's agammaglobulinemia
- Color blindness
- Complete androgen insensitivity syndrome
- Congenital aqueductal stenosis (hydrocephalus)
- Duchenne muscular dystrophy
- Fabry disease
- Glucose-6-phosphate dehydrogenase deficiency
- Haemophilia A and B
- Hunter syndrome
- Inherited nephrogenic diabetes insipidus
- Menkes disease (kinky hair syndrome)
- Ornithine carbamoyltransferase deficiency
- Wiskott–Aldrich syndrome

==== Duchenne muscular dystrophy ====
Duchenne muscular dystrophy is a severe neuromuscular disease causing progressive weakness and damage of muscle tissues, leading to mobility loss and difficulties in daily activities. In a later stage of Duchenne muscular dystrophy, as respiratory and cardiac muscles start to degenerate, affected individuals are likely to develop complications such as respiratory failure, cardiomyopathy and heart failure. 1 in 3,600 male births worldwide are affected by Duchenne muscular dystrophy, moreover, it presents itself at around ages 2–4 and progressively worsens. Most cases of Duchenne muscular dystrophy are inherited from the mother who is a carrier of the X-linked recessive trait, however, approximately 30% occur due to random mutations that are not inherited.

Duchenne muscular dystrophy arises from a mutation, likely to be the deletion of the exons, a nucleotide sequence in the DMD gene that codes for dystrophin. Dystrophin is a protein responsible for strengthening and stabilizing muscle fibres. With the loss of the dystrophin complex, the muscle cells would no longer be protected and therefore result in progressive damage or degeneration. Although interventions vary case by case, corticosteroids are often used to delay the progressive degeneration of muscle cells.

==== X-linked agammaglobulinemia ====
X-linked agammaglobulinemia is a primary immunodeficiency disorder that impairs the body's ability to produce antibodies, which are proteins protecting us from disease-causing antigens, resulting in severe bacterial infections.

X-linked agammaglobulinemia is associated with a mutation in the Bruton's tyrosine kinase (BTK) gene, a cytoplasmic signalling molecule, on the X chromosome. The gene is responsible for producing BTK, an enzyme regulating B cells development and maturation within the bone marrow. It is also involved in the further development of the B cells that migrate into the secondary lymphoid tissues like the lymph nodes and spleen. B cells are a type of white blood cells essential in the production of antibodies, when at an early stage, called pre-B cells, they rely on expansion and survival signals involving BTK to mature.

In affected individuals, their BTK gene mutations can range from point mutations to indels that alter the amino acid sequence and the structure of BTK making it faulty. Therefore, the loss of BTK gene functions, prevents the maturation from pre-B cell to B cell lymphocytes hence, not able to differentiate into antibodies-producing plasma cells. With low antibodies, individuals are highly vulnerable to bacterial and viral infections.

==== Red-green colour blindness ====
Red-green colour blindness is a type of colour vision deficiency caused by a mutation in X-linked genes, affecting cone cells responsible for absorbing red or green light. Primarily affecting males (1 in 12) compared to females (1 in 200), as the condition requires all the X chromosomes to have the mutations.

The perception of red and green light is attributed to the Long (L) and Medium (M) wavelength cones, respectively. In Red-green colour blindness, mutations take place on the OPN1LW which impairs L-cones, and OPN1MW genes, which impairs the medium cones coding for the photopigments in the cones. In milder cases, those affected exhibit reduced sensitivity to red or green light, as a result of hybridization of the genes, shifting the response of one cone towards that of the other. In the more extreme conditions, there is a deletion or replacement of the respective coding genes, resulting in the absence of L or M cones photopigments and thus losing the ability to differentiate between red or green light completely.

==== Hemophilia A ====
Haemophilia A is a blood clotting disease caused by a genetic defect in clotting factor VIII. It causes significant susceptibility to both internal and external bleeding. 1 in 5,617 live male births is affected, and the condition primarily affects males, while females are usually carriers with mild low clotting factor level symptoms, due to X-inactivation. The X-linked mutations are inherited from the mother, however, about ⅓ cases are mutations like point mutations or indels that have occurred spontaneously. Mutations in the F8 gene cause hemophilia A, while mutations in the F9 gene cause hemophilia. The F8 gene encodes for coagulation factor VIII, hence with missing proteins there cannot be effective clotting of the blood.

Individuals having more severe haemophilia can experience more frequent and intense bleeding, and typically severe hemophilia A affects most patients. Patients with mild haemophilia often do not experience heavy bleeding except for surgeries and significant trauma.

Glucose-6-phosphate dehydrogenase deficiency

Glucose-6-phosphate dehydrogenase (G6PD) deficiency, is characterized by when the enzyme that helps red blood cells to work properly. Without the enzyme red blood cells will prematurely break down leading to hemolytic anemia. This is a condition that shows a low red blood cell count since the body cannot compensate for the quick degrading cells. Glucose-6-phosphate dehydrogenase is an enzyme that protects red blood cells from oxidative stress caused by reactive oxygen species, it will reduce the amount of ROS accumulation of ROS in the red blood cells. A mutation in the G6PD gene causes this deficiency, leaving the cells with no protective enzyme. Approximately 400 million individuals have been affected by G6PD deficiency. Since the gene is located on the X- chromosome, therefore, the condition usually affects males more than females. Since males received have the mutated gene on the X-chromosome from the carrier mothers, they tend to show the symptoms of G6PD deficiency. Since females have two X chromosomes, they are typically carriers. However, when the healthy G6PD gene-carrying chromosome is inactivated females may exhibit mild symptoms.

Wiskott–Aldrich syndrome

Wiskott-Aldrich syndrome is an X-linked recessive disorder that is caused by mutations in the WAS gene that encodes for the WASp protein. It is characterized by weakened immune function, eczema, and problems with blood clotting. This protein is responsible for cell movement and cell-to-cell adhesions. It relays the signals from the surface of all blood cells to the actin cytoskeleton of the cells to trigger movement and adhesion. When there is the loss of WASp due to the mutation it causes the actin cytoskeleton to not properly form, or not form at all. In white blood cells, this becomes a problem as the lack of actin cytoskeleton does not allow it to respond to the environment and foreign invaders. Therefore, having impaired immune responses causes increased vulnerability to infections and autoimmune diseases. Moreover, a lack of WASp proteins can impair cell growth and induce early cell death. The WAS gene is located on the X-chromosome, hence primarily affecting the males who inherit the mutated X-chromosome. Females tend to be the carriers and typically do not show symptoms until the healthy X-chromosome is inactivated.

== Screening for genetic diseases ==
Genetic screening, which includes carrier screening, prenatal screening and newborn screening may be performed to enable early detection of genetic defects.

=== Carrier screening ===
Carrier screening is conducted on prospective parent(s) to determine if they are carriers (heterozygous) for an X-linked recessive or autosomal recessive disease. Individuals who undergo carrier screening commonly have a family history of genetic disease or belong to an at-risk population and wish to determine the likelihood of having a child with a genetic disorder. Carrier screening is performed by taking a blood sample, saliva sample or buccal swab and using laboratory techniques such as next-generation sequencing or Polymerase Chain Reaction (PCR) to determine if the parent carries the allele implicated in the genetic disease.

=== Prenatal screening ===
Prenatal screening is can be conducted on pregnant females to test for a number of genetic conditions. It is more commonly used to test for aneuploidy (for example, Down syndrome or trisomy 21), but can also be used to detect X-linked recessive or X-linked dominant disorders (for example, fragile X-syndrome). Prenatal screening involves maternal blood tests and ultrasound to defect such defects in the developing fetus. This can confirm the diagnosis of a genetic condition, allowing parents to prepare or consider terminating the pregnancy.

=== Newborn screening ===
Newborn screening is conducted on infants less than a week old to test for a variety of genetic disorders, specifically those with high morbidity and mortality rates to enable early intervention. Newborn screening is conducted by analyzing the biochemistry of a spot of dried blood (often obtained via a heel prick test). This form of screening is also used to detect endocrine and metabolic disorders.

== Y-linked inheritance ==
=== The Y chromosome ===
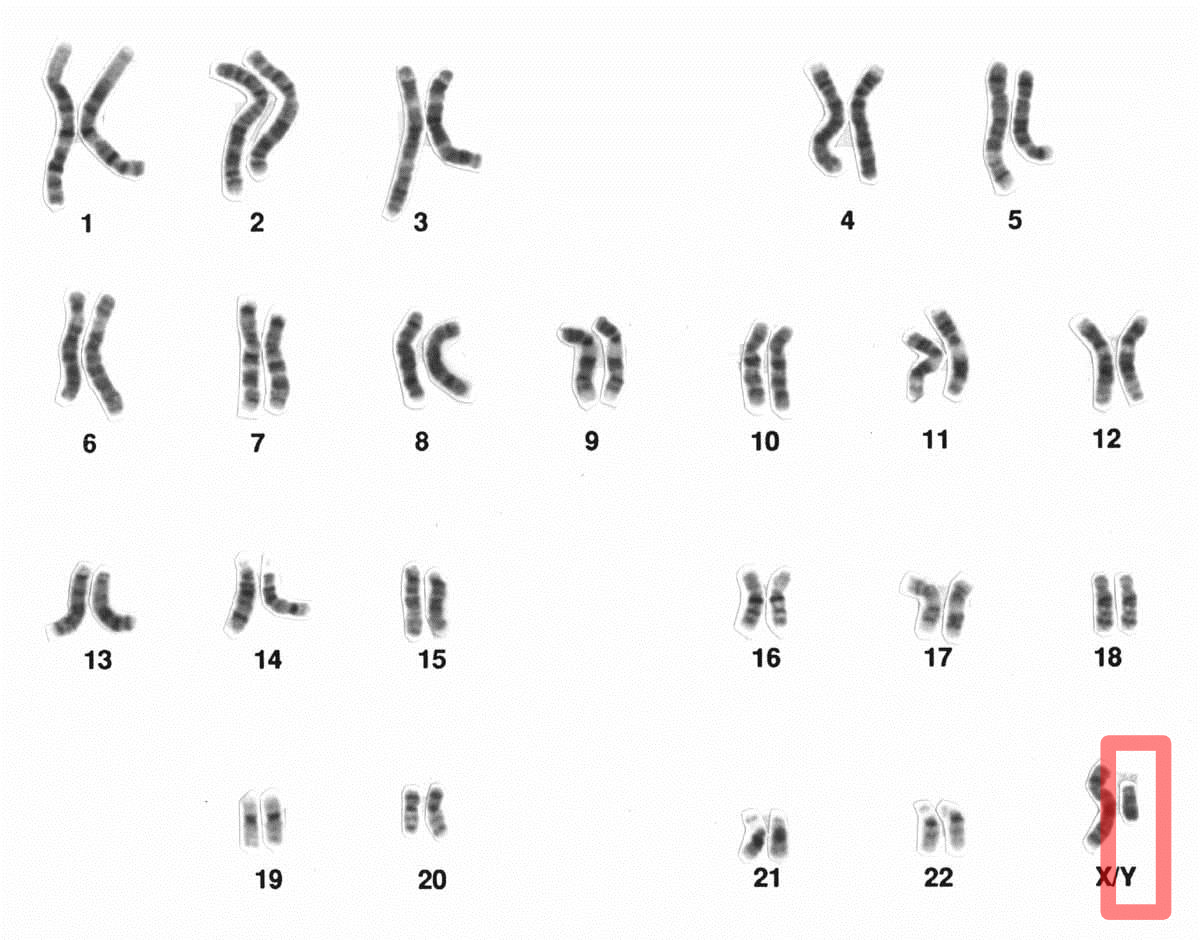
This image depicts a karyotype. The Y chromosome is at the bottom right in a red box. Note how it is notably smaller than the X chromosome, the chromosome to its left.

The Y chromosome is composed of approximately 59 million base pairs and 200 genes, entailing approximately 66 protein-coding genes. Since only biological males possess the Y chromosome, it is essential in male sexual differentiation, which results in the production of male sex hormones that lead to the development of male sex organs, reproduction, fertility, and spermatogenesis, commonly known as sperm production. Additionally, due to the small length of the Y chromosome in comparison to the X chromosome, recombination is mostly suppressed, and thus it remains relatively distinct from the X chromosome, maintaining important genes for male fertility and sexual differentiation. Particularly, the SRY gene on the Y chromosome is known to be involved in sex determination. As well, AZF, azoospermia factor region encodes for 16 proteins, and are thus related to the production of sperm.

The Y chromosome has a highly repetitive sequence, and thus had many gaps that were not able to be sequenced until recently. Based on advances in the Makova Lab at Penn State and Phillippy at the Human Genome Research Institute, they successfully filled in the missing sequence gaps.

=== The SRY gene ===
The SRY gene, being the sex-determining region of the Y chromosome, gives the genetic information required for the body to code for proteins that are involved in male sexual differentiation. The expression of the SRY gene is regulated via a myriad of transcription factors, which is a protein that can bind to genes of interest and increase or decrease their expression. Specific to SRY these include, Six1, WT1, and Gata4. SRY expression is regulated spatially and temporally in a strict manner. The SRY gene encodes a transcription factor called the Testes Determining Factor (Tdf), and Tdf binds to and activates another gene called Sox9. Sox9 then codes a transcription factor that leads to the development of the testes via many downstream pathways that ultimately result in the targeting of Sertoli cell which is where sperm is produced and the Lydig cell, also called testicular somatic cells, which is where the androgen hormone is produced, that is essential for male sexual differentiation. Therefore, SRY expression leads to testis development in biological XY males, and absence of SRY in biological XX females, leads to ovary development.

Swyer syndrome, also known as complete gonadal dysgenesis or pure gonadal dysgenesis, is a condition that impairs the process of sexual differentiation in males. Male individuals with this condition have a normal XY genotype, yet due to the impairment of the SRY gene, the protein critical in male sexual determination is non-functional or is not produced at all. As a result, male sexual differentiation is prevented, and an affected individual will lack male sexual characteristics such as gonads, and will instead develop biological female-typical sex characteristics, such as a uterus, fallopian tubes, etc.

=== Y-linked inheritance ===
Y-linked inheritance, also known as Holandric inheritance, refers to genes that are inherited via the Y chromosome. In other words, Y-linked inheritance involves genes that are only carried on the Y chromosome, also known as Y-linked genes.

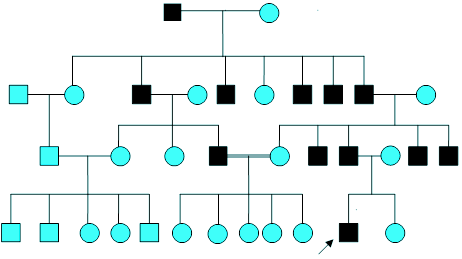
This is a pedigree representing the offspring of individuals. Squares represent males, and circles represent females. More specifically, this pedigree depicts Y-linked or Holandric inheritance. This shows how Y-linked disorders will be passed to all son offspring, and will not be passed down at all to daughters, due to their absence of chromosome.

Inheritance of Y-linked genes can occur in two ways: complete inheritance and incomplete inheritance. Complete Y-linkage results when a gene is only found on a certain area on the Y chromosome either because there is no allele i.e. a copy of that gene, on the X chromosome or because it does not exchange with the X chromosome's allele. Complete Y linkage of heterogamous organisms can result in the following possible outcomes:

- Traits that only occur in males
- Y-linked disorders of males will be passed on to all sons
- The daughters of affected men being phenotypically normal, i.e. 'normal' presenting, and not having affected offspring

Conversely, incomplete Y linkage is when traits on a gene cross-over and exchange information between the X and Y chromosome.

=== Y-linked disorders ===
==== Overview ====
The first few Y-linked inheritance cases were recognized in the early 20th century, with initial theories proposing certain traits were passed exclusively from father to son. However, it was not until genetic advancements and cytogenetic techniques that enabled researchers to have a better understanding of the Y chromosome in greater detail. When scientist began mapping the Y chromosome and identifying traits that followed a paternal lineage, it became evident that certain genetic conditions were linked to the male-specific chromosome. The identification of Y-linked inheritance marked a significant milestone in laying the groundwork for expanding research into male-specific conditions. Further understanding led to exploration of developmental disorders, allowing of diagnostic and therapeutic strategies to be explored in medical genetics. Eventually, ongoing investigations into Y chromosome revealed the broader picture in human biology, evolution and disease susceptibility.

==== Hypertrichosis ====
Hypertrichosis is a genetic condition that results in the excessive growth of hair on a specific area of the body, that is abnormal for the age, sex or race of an individual. Specifically, hypertrichosis centralized to the outer ear, also known as the auricle, is a Y-linked disordered, commonly referred to as hypertrichosis pinnae auris. Since hypertrichosis pinnae auris is a Y-linked disorder, this means only biological males and subsequent male offspring can be affected by this disorder. Tommasi C. was crucial in determining the Y-linked origin of this disorder, by creating a pedigree that elicited holandric inheritance. Conversely, hypertrichosis cannot be confused with Hirustism, which is characterized by excessive androgen sensitive hair growth, and thus is most often diagnosed in women and children that tend to have male-typical hair patterns.

Considered to be relatively rare as the congenital form is classified in 2 categories; generalized hypertrichosis (CGH) and localized hypertrichosis (CLH).

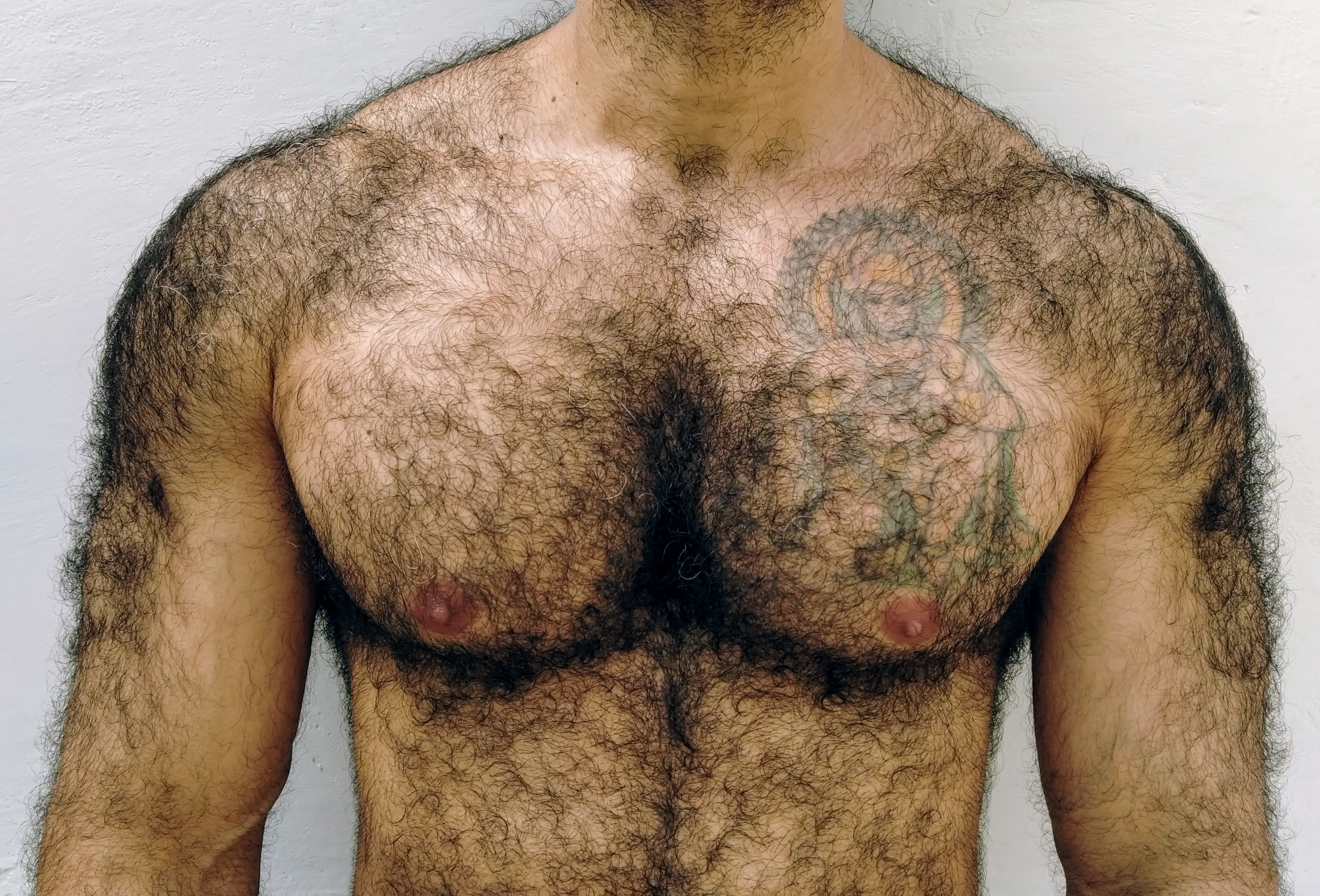
The image depicts hypertrichosis, specifically overgrowth of chest hair in varying places

CGH is seen amongst individuals with excessive hair growth that cover most of the body while CLH affects a specific area of the body, typically a patch of area. Although the incidence is unknown, it seen that CGH is extremely rare with very few cases documented worldwide compared to CLH is more commonly seen. Now acquired hypertrichosis is a type that can develop later in life, typically from medicinal triggers or from underlying medical conditions.

==== Webbed toes ====
Webbing of the toes is the result of premature arrested development in the fetal stage. The premature arrest of development results in second and third digit fusion of the skin. The Y-linked trait of webbed toes causes a skin connection between the second and third digit. Research studies based in a pedigree analysis have shown that webbed toes follow holandric inheritance in biological males.

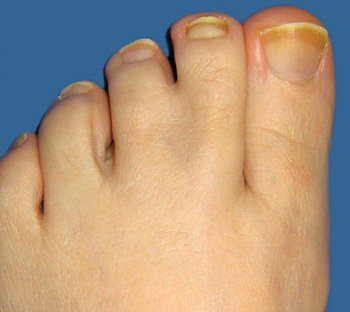
This image depicts webbed toes, whereby there is a connection of the second and third digits.

Considered to be the most prevalent congenital limb malformation where the occurrence is 1 in 2000-3000 in live births, accounting for 20% of congenial hand malformation. The condition is more frequently seen in males where it is a 2:1 ratio for male-to-females. Syndactyl can present as an "isolated anomaly" where it occurs as a standalone condition often with no known cause. In other scenarios, syndactyl is a features amongst other symptoms of a larger genetic disorder (ie. Holt-Oram syndrome).

=== Infertility in biological males ===
==== Overview ====
Y-linked genes responsible for spermatogenesis can result in male infertility, characterized by azoospermia, or hypo-fertility, which is the hindered production of sperm. Azoospermia is the absence of functional sperm in male ejaculate due to issues in sperm motility or lack of sperm production. As a result, Y-chromosome linked infertility is characterized as the inability to fertilize an egg and produce children. Sperm infertility results from the failure of the sperm to mature or a disfigured sperm that is not able to travel and fertilize an egg effectively.

==== Prevalence of Y chromosome Infertility ====
Male infertility affects 1 in 20 men, at 0.05% and primary spermatogenic failure accounts for a large portion of these cases. More specifically, Y chromosome infertility is relatively rare at a 0.03-0.05% frequency.

==== Etiology of Y chromosome Infertility ====
Mutations to the male-specific region of the Y chromosome (MSY) are typically the cause of spermatogenic failure, which is the reduced or absent sperm production in semen. More specifically, deletions in long arm of the Y chromosome are associated with spermatogenic failure, as well some paternal lineages of the Y chromosome are associated with reduced sperm counts. Y chromosome deletions are determined as the most frequent cause of genetic azoospermia, however other instances such as rearrangements, deletions and duplications may contribute to infertile biological males.

== Sex chromosome aneuploidy ==
Thus far, this article has discussed the patterns of inheritance of sex-linked genes / traits in diploid organisms with the canonical XX (female) or XY (male) genotype. However, there exists a very small fraction of the human population with aneuploidy (an abnormal number) of the sex chromosomes. This includes monosomy of the X-chromosome (XO genotype), also called Turner syndrome, in which up to 0.04% of females are born with one X-chromosome as supposed to two. Turner syndrome can result in developmental and health-related issues, including short stature, problems with ovarian development, and congenital heart defects. Females can also present with trisomy of the X-chromosome, or the XXX genotype, which can result in tall stature, and in some cases, delayed development of speech, language, and motor functions. Sex chromosome aneuploidy which results in male development includes the XXY genotype, and very rarely, the XXYY genotype. XXY, also known as Klinefelter syndrome, can result in a variety of symptoms, the severity of which is widely variable. Symptoms may include tall stature and reduced testosterone production, leading to delayed or incomplete development of male sex characteristics. Those with Klinefelter syndrome will also be at greater risk for developing of learning disorders, Attention-Deficit Hyperactivity Disorder (ADHD), Autism Spectrum Disorder (ASD), and metabolic syndromes. Males with the XXYY genotype exhibit similar but often more severe symptoms to Klinefelter syndrome, and are infertile.

It is notable that, while sex chromosome aneuploidy is not an inherited condition (and instead arises due to nondisjunction of the sex chromosomes during meiosis) in individuals with an abnormal number of sex chromosomes, the patterns of inheritance and expression of sex-linked genes and traits will vary from those discussed for XX and XY individuals. This is largely due to the dosage imbalance of one or both of the sex-chromosomes. For instance, a XO female with Turner syndrome would be affected by X-linked recessive traits in the same way as XY males, lacking a second X-chromosome encoding a dominant allele to mask the recessive phenotype. Moreover, inactivation of all but one X-chromosomes by Xist, and the fact that nondisjunction during meiosis can lead to aneuploidy in either all or some of the body's cells, can lead to genetic mosaicism and intermediate phenotypes.

== Sex-linkage in animals ==
Most mammals, including humans, use the XY sex determination system and thus follow the same patterns of sex-linked inheritance discussed herein so long as the sex chromosomes are present in normal ploidy (diploidy). However, patterns of inheritance of sex-linked traits differ in animals that use sex-determination systems other than XY. For instance, in the ZW sex-determination system used by birds, the mammalian pattern is reversed, since the male is the homogametic (ZZ) and the female is heterogametic (ZW).

Drosophila melanogaster, a common model organism in genetics and developmental biology, carry both the X and Y sex chromosomes. However, the rules of sex determination are not the same as in humans and other placental mammals in which sex is determined by the presence or absence of the Y-chromosome. Instead, sex is determined by the ratio of X-chromosomes to autosomes, the X:A ratio. A ratio of 1:2 results in male development, while a ratio of 1:1 results in female development. Drosophila have two autosomes, thus XO and XY flies are males (1X:2A), while XX flies are females (2X:2A). As the X-chromosome makes up a far more significant portion of the genome, far more genes are sex-linked in Drosophila as compared to humans. Moreover, the mechanism of dosage compensation in Drosophila is not X-inactivation in females, but the two-fold upregulation of expression of genes encoded on the X-chromosome in males.

Much of the scientific knowledge on sex-linked traits was derived from observations and experimental evidence made in non-human animals. Some of the discoveries instrumental to forming this body of knowledge include:

- The first sex-linked gene ever discovered was the "lacticolor" X-linked recessive gene in the moth Abraxas grossulariata by Leonard Doncaster.
- White eyes in Drosophila melanogaster flies was one of the earliest sex-linked genes discovered.
- Fur color in domestic cats: Calico or tortoiseshell cats are nearly always female because these cats receive one allele for black (or gray) fur colour on one inherited X-chromosome, and one allele for orange fur colour on the other X-chromosome. White fur colour is located on an autosome. Thus, only females and XXY males can have this fur coloration.

== History ==
Experimental cross performed by Thomas Hunt Morgan, illustrating the X-linked inheritance of white-eyed mutation in fruit flies

=== Discovery of sex chromosomes ===
The relationship between sex chromosomes and Mendelian inheritance was first discovered by Nettie Stevens. Steven's was influenced by McClung's work highlighting, that some insect species, the difference in chromosome counts possibly determined whether cells develop into males or females. In Steven's study called Studies in spermatogenesis, she found that biological females carry two X chromosomes, whereas males carry one X and a smaller Y chromosome. By identifying the male unique role of the Y chromosome, Stevens was able to confirm a chromosomal role in sex determination. She had done this by using a microscope Tenebrio molitor, mealworm beetles, to observe that there were 20 chromosome in both the male and females. However, in the males, she had found that the 20th chromosome was significantly smaller than the other 19 chromosomes. Steven's continued Studies in spermatogenesis, and found the same pattern in 18 other species. Additionally, her work contradicted the common theories that attributed to sex determination, including role of environmental factors.

=== Discovery of X-linked inheritance ===
Red-green colour blindness was the first described on paper, in 1794 by John Dalton, who was affected by the disorder himself. However, its recognition of its X-linked inheritance characteristic was only established later. The X-chromosome was discovered in 1890 by Hermann Henking, which he discovered while studying spermatocyte divisions of the firebug. He found that one chromosome behaved different from all the others, and did not divide during meiosis. Instead, he found that it went into one of the two germ cells. This cell that did not divide became known as the X-chromosome. Then in 1910, Thomas Hunt Morgan discovered an X-linked mutation on a Drosophila, who then conducted experiments and observations to understand the X-linked inheritance. He observed a white-eye male fruit fly, which is rare, and through cross-breeding experiments, he found that the mutation was inherited differently in males and females. He found that males, who had the only one X-chromosomes displayed the condition, if the mutated gene was present.

=== Discovery of X-inactivation ===
In 1961, Mary F. Lyon proposed that one of the two X chromosomes in female mammalian cells would experience random inactivation (see X-chromosome inactivation) in the early embryonic stage. According to her hypothesis, both males and females should have one single X chromosome that is active. This enhanced the understanding of the fundamental mechanisms of X-linked inheritance.

== Related terms ==
It is important to distinguish between sex-linked characters, which are controlled by genes on sex chromosomes, and two other categories.

=== Sex-influenced traits ===
Sex-influenced or sex-conditioned traits are phenotypes affected by whether they appear in a male or female body. Even in a homozygous dominant or recessive female the condition may not be expressed fully. Example: baldness in humans.

=== Sex-limited traits ===
These are characters only expressed in one sex. They may be caused by genes on either autosomal or sex chromosomes. Examples: female sterility in Drosophila; and many polymorphic characters in insects, especially in relation to mimicry. Closely linked genes on autosomes called "supergenes" are often responsible for the latter.

== See also ==
- X-linked dominant inheritance
- X-linked recessive inheritance
- Genetic epidemiology
- List of genetic disorders
