= Tony Labillois =

Canadian statistician

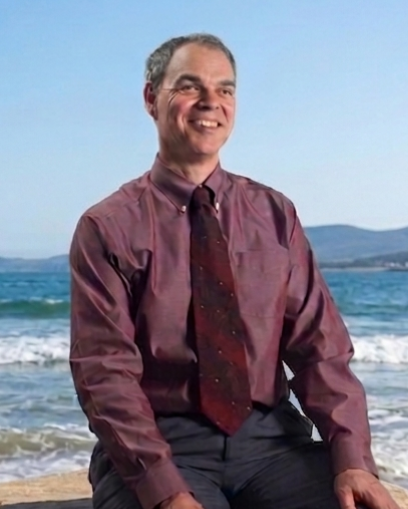
- Born: 1967; Gaspé Peninsula
- Education: Université Laval; Canada School of Public Service
- Occupation: Statistician
- Employer: Statistics Canada
- Awards: Statistics Canada Career Excellence Award (2025); Elected member of the International Statistical Institute (2025); King Charles III Coronation Medal (2025); Queen Elizabeth II Diamond Jubilee Medal (2012); Silver Medal GTEC (2003)

Tony Labillois is a Canadian statistician recognized for his commitment to accessibility and inclusion for people with disabilities. Born with a visual impairment, he pursued a career at Statistics Canada until his retirement in 2024 and has remained active both nationally and internationally ever since.

== Early life ==
Tony was born in 1967 on the Gaspé Peninsula in Québec. His parents learned he had congenital cataracts shortly after his birth, and he would live with vision of approximately 20/400 in his left eye after unsuccessful surgery in his right eye. His cataracts also caused him nystagmus, resulting in involuntary eye movements.

His parents chose to send him to the local elementary school in New Richmond rather than to board at the Nazareth Institute in Montreal. Since he was unable to read the blackboard, he instead developed his ability to memorize what he heard. The sea played a central role in his life, and his childhood was marked by fishing, boating, and swimming at the beach.

Tony then attended Antoine-Bernard high school in Carleton-sur-Mer, where he worked hard to achieve grades of 90% or higher. He convinced his parents to buy him his first computer in 1981, when he was in his second year of high school, and taught himself computer science and programming. He became co-manager of his school's computer lab and introduced students to the basics of computing. For four summers, he worked as a programmer at the Stone Consolidated Pulp and Paper Mill in New Richmond.

An award was created in Tony's name and presented to him at his graduation ball in 1984 to recognize his determination. Since then, the Tony Labillois Award has been given to graduating students who have demonstrated perseverance and courage in the face of a major obstacle, and Tony participates by presenting the award himself or through a representative and matching the school's scholarship. Receiving this award had a profound impact on Tony's life and how he perceives himself.

Tony moved to Cap-Rouge at the end of the summer of 1984 to pursue his college studies in pure and applied sciences at Campus Notre-Dame-de-Foy. To see the blackboard, he used a small telescope, which he also used in other situations in his daily life. It was around this time that he bought his first car, which his friends drove for him.

While he was interested in the natural sciences, Tony decided instead to pursue university studies in statistics, wanting to be realistic about his future career. He moved to Quebec City, where he obtained a bachelor's degree specializing in statistics in 1989 from Université Laval.

== Career ==
Tony decided to participate in a Statistics Canada recruitment campaign in 1988, while still a student. Before taking the exam, he requested accommodations, but on the day of, they were not provided. Having always managed without assistance, he insisted on taking the exam anyway, but the examiner insisted he postpone it in order to receive his requested accommodations. Tony was touched by this consideration, noting that such a gesture was far from common at the time. Statistics Canada offered him a job as a methodologist in 1989, and he moved to Ottawa to work at the agency. He was provided with a swing arm so he could position his computer screen close to his face.

Tony initially worked as a methodologist in the divisions responsible for business and household survey methods, before becoming a manager in 1997 and leading the design and implementation of over twenty special business surveys. In the year 2000, he became an assistant director and led the implementation of the secure electronic data collection infrastructure, for which his team won the GTEC Silver Medal in 2003 for improving services to citizens and businesses. He co-led the revision of the Financial Management System before becoming the data warehouse manager for the System of National Accounts in 2008.

Tony was the manager of the National Accounts Integration Group from 2013 to 2015, where he co-led the 2012 version of the Canadian Classification of Institutional Units and Sectors, developed to implement the international recommendations published in the 2008 National Accounts handbook. He then returned to the role of assistant director and supported the federal and provincial governments during a major softwood lumber crisis in 2015. He also participated in an international cooperation project with Senegal between 2018 and 2020 to improve the country's mining statistics.

In 2020, Tony was appointed to a director role and developed new programs and modernized public sector statistical processes. He was subsequently appointed Director General in 2022, a position in which he co-led the Disaggregated Data Action Plan, which provides a better understanding of the realities of diverse groups through more detailed data, thereby contributing to more equitable policies and services. He participated in the creation of the Centre for Municipal and Local Data in partnership with the Federation of Canadian Municipalities, which provides, among other things, disaggregated financial data on municipalities and other local public governments. Tony represented Canada at the United Nations Human Rights Council in Geneva during the 4th Universal Periodic Review, where he advocated for the importance of disaggregated data.

Throughout his career, Tony has participated in national and international conferences, presenting papers and sometimes even sharing his personal and professional journey. He was involved in several Statistics Canada management committees as well as interdepartmental committees and leads a professional life focused on continuous learning and collaborative work.

Tony retired from Statistics Canada in July 2024. Since January 2025, he has worked as a consultant in accessibility, public policy, leadership, and data.

In 2025, Tony was recognized as an elected member of the International Statistical Institute for his significant and sustained contributions at the national and international levels in the field. In 2026, Statistics Canada presented him with the Career Excellence Award at its 43rd Annual Awards of Excellence.

== Commitment to accessibility ==
In 2002, Tony became the Disability Champion at Statistics Canada, acting as a liaison between employees with disabilities and management to identify issues and implement concrete actions that promote their inclusion in the workplace. He also supported employees with episodic, temporary, or invisible disabilities. From 2013 to 2024, he was a member of the Interdepartmental Committee of Disability Champions.

Tony participated in the consultations held from 2016 to 2017 for Bill C-81, An Act to ensure a barrier-free Canada (Accessible Canada Act), which came into force on July 11, 2019. He also served on the Parliamentary Precinct campus' Universal Accessibility Advisory Committee from 2019 to 2024 and was a guest contributor to the Office of Public Service Accessibility 2022-2023 evaluation working group at the Treasury Board of Canada Secretariat.

Tony volunteers his time and expertise in several accessibility and inclusion initiatives. Since 2020, he has served as Vice-Chair of the Governing Council and Chair of the Advisory Council of the Canadian Accessibility Network, established in December 2019, which enables more than 150 organizations and 250 professionals to collaborate on promoting economic and social accessibility for people with disabilities across Canada. From 2021 to 2024, he was a member of the Board of Directors of Kéroul, an organization dedicated to making culture and tourism accessible to people with disabilities. He is also a mentor with the MentorAbility Canada program, an association that supports the recruitment and employment of people with disabilities, and with SkillingUp Canada, which supports digital skills development.

In 2025, Tony, who has never used a cane or a guide dog, participated in the Mira Foundation's Vision Challenge, which provides free guide and assistance dogs to people with visual and motor impairments, as well as to people with autism. As part of this challenge, he participated in a car race with more than 35 cars, where he drove blindfolded, guided by a co-pilot.

== Selected publications ==
- "Transforming the Federal Government Is Not Enough to Build an Interoperable Digital Canada." CIRANO (October 14, 2026). With Alain Dudoit.
- "Trusted Data for Prosperity and Human Rights: The Canadian Experience." Joint Statistical Meeting 2026, Boston, Massachusetts, August 1-6, 2026.
- "Disaggregated Data in Canada: Leveraging Citizen Data to Complement Official Statistics." 5th ISI Regional Statistics Conference, Valleta, Malta, 3-5 June, 2026.
- "Federalism and the quality of official statistics: Comparative lessons from Argentina, Canada, Germany, India, Nigeria, Switzerland and the United States." Statistical Journal of the IAOS (2026). With Luca Di Gennaro Splendore, Carl Camilleri, Steve Macfeely, and Mario Thomas Vassalo.
- "Citizen-centric public sector data interoperability in Canada: Enabling a mutualized sovereign capacity." CIRANO (May 11, 2026). With Alain Dudoit and Anne-Marie Hubert.
- Conclusion to Constitutional Intelligence: A Decision Architecture for Trustworthy AI Governance, by Celio Oliveira (Friesenpress, 2026).
- "Leadership as stewardship: Cultivating ethical culture and communicating values in national statistical offices." Conference of European Statisticians, Geneva, Switzerland, 12-13 March, 2026.
- "Public sector data interoperability and responsible adoption of AI in Canada: Strategic overview and call to action." CIRANO (February 2, 2026). With Alain Dudoit and Celio Oliveira.
- "Digital sovereignty and artificial intelligence in Canada: From system fragmentation to integrated strategic capacity in the public sector." CIRANO (December 2, 2025). With Alain Dudoit.
- "Research and analysis to better understand data and collection activities." In Proceedings of the Survey Methods Section: Statistical Society of Canada Annual Meeting, May 2004. With Judy Lee.
