= Congenital cataract =

Opacity in the eye's lens present at birth

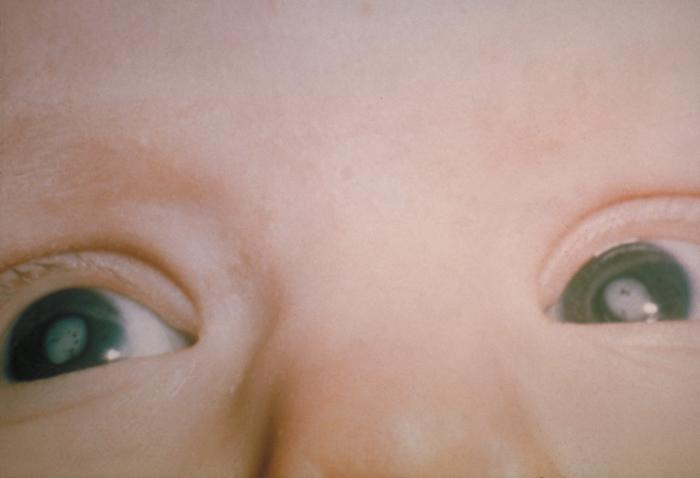
- Bilateral cataracts in an infant due to congenital rubella syndrome.
- Specialty: Medical genetics, ophthalmology

Congenital cataracts are a lens opacity that is present at birth. Congenital cataracts occur in a broad range of severity. Some lens opacities do not progress and are visually insignificant, others can produce profound visual impairment.

Congenital cataracts may be unilateral or bilateral. They can be classified by morphology, presumed or defined genetic cause, presence of specific metabolic disorders, or associated ocular anomalies or systemic findings.

Treatment options depend on the severity of the condition. For children under the age of two years old whose vision is affected by the cataracts in both eyes, surgical options include intraocular lens implantation or a lensectomy.

Congenital cataracts are considered to be a significant cause of childhood blindness. This condition is considered 'treatable' with early intervention and compared to other types of childhood visual loss problems, however, in parts of the world where treatment options are not available such as some low-income countries, the condition may go untreated and the person may lose their vision. Early in life treatment is important, especially during development, in order that the person's eyes and visual system develops normally.

== Signs and symptoms ==
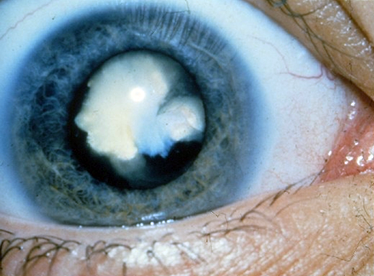
Congenital cataract in an adult

Congenital cataracts occur in a variety of morphologic configurations, including lamellar, polar, sutural, coronary, cerulean, nuclear, capsular, complete, membranous. Some signs that a child may have a cataract are the child being unable to follow faces or objects, inward or outward deviation of one or both eyes, shaking of one or both eyes, and/or the presence of white reflex in one or both eyes.

== Cause ==
In general, approximately one-third of congenital cataracts are a component of a more extensive syndrome or disease (e.g., cataract resulting from congenital rubella syndrome), one-third occur as an isolated inherited trait, and one-third result from undetermined causes. Metabolic diseases tend to be more commonly associated with bilateral cataracts.

Genetic & metabolic	Infections	Anomalies	Toxic
Down syndrome Hallermann-Streiff syndrome Lowe syndrome Galactosemia Cockayne syndrome Marfan syndrome Trisomy 13- 15 Hypoglycemia Alport syndrome Myotonic dystrophy Fabry disease Hypoparathyroidism Conradi syndrome Incontinentia pigmenti	Toxoplasmosis Other (Coxsackievirus, Syphilis, Varicella-Zoster, HIV, and Parvo B19) Rubella Cytomegalovirus Herpes Simplex (HSV-1, HSV-2)	Aniridia Anterior segment dysgenesis Persistent fetal vasculature (PFV) Posterior lenticonus	Corticosteroids Radiation

Ultrasound axial scan of the fetal head with eye movements and a unilateral lens opacity seen at 20 weeks of pregnancy

=== Genetics ===
Approximately 50% of all congenital cataract cases may have a genetic cause which is quite heterogeneous. It is known that different mutations in the same gene can cause similar cataract patterns, while the highly variable morphologies of cataracts within some families suggest that the same mutation in a single gene can lead to different phenotypes. More than 25 loci and genes on different chromosomes have been associated with congenital cataract. Mutations in distinct genes, which encode the main cytoplasmic proteins of human lens, have been associated with cataracts of various morphologies, including genes encoding crystallins (CRYA, CRYB, and CRYG), lens specific connexins (Cx43, Cx46, and Cx50), major intrinsic protein (MIP) or Aquaporin, cytoskeletal structural proteins, paired-like homeodomain transcription factor 3 (PITX3), avian musculoaponeurotic fibrosarcoma (MAF), and heat shock transcription factor 4 (HSF4).

== Diagnosis ==
All newborns should have screening eye examinations, including an evaluation of the red reflexes.

- The red reflex test is best performed in a darkened room and involves shining a bright direct ophthalmoscope into both eyes simultaneously from a distance of 1– 2 ft. This test can be used for routine ocular screening by nurses, pediatricians, family practitioners, and optometrists.
- Retinoscopy through the child's undilated pupil is helpful for assessing the potential visual significance of an axial lens opacity in a pre-verbal child. Any central opacity or surrounding cortical distortion greater than 3 mm can be assumed to be visually significant.
- Laboratory Tests : In contrast to unilateral cataracts, bilateral congenital cataracts may be associated with many systemic and metabolic diseases. A basic laboratory evaluation for bilateral cataracts of unknown cause in apparently healthy children includes:

- Urine test for reducing substance, galactose 1-phosphate uridyltransferase, galactokinase, amino acids
- Infectious diseases: TORCH and varicella titers, VDRL
- Serum calcium, phosphorus, glucose and ferritin

== Treatment ==
=== Surgery ===
In general, the younger the child, the greater the urgency in removing the cataract, because of the risk of amblyopia during development. For optimal visual development in newborns and young infants, a visually significant unilateral congenital cataract should be detected and removed before age 6 weeks, and visually significant bilateral congenital cataracts should be removed before age 10 weeks. Surgical options if the cataracts are bilateral and the vision is compromised include removing the affected lens of the eye and correcting the vision as early as possible so that the infants eyes can develop normally with visual stimuli.

Some congenital cataracts are too small to affect vision, therefore no surgery or treatment will be done. If they are superficial and small, an ophthalmologist will continue to monitor them throughout a patient's life. Commonly, a patient with small congenital cataracts that do not affect vision will eventually be affected later in life; generally this will take decades to occur.

== Prognosis ==
The prognosis for a congenital cataract varies based on several factors. These factors include clouding of the lens present at birth, time of detection, and effectiveness of treatment. When detected early, a congenital cataract has the most favorable outcome. Most cases of congenital cataracts require surgery to remove the cataract, but advancements in pediatric ophthalmology and surgical techniques have significantly improved success rates. Prompt surgical intervention can help restore vision. Early intervention can also prevent long-term conditions such as amblyopia, also known as lazy eye. The prognosis may be influenced by associated conditions or complications. Follow-up care is essential to monitor visual development and address any potential challenges that may arise. With timely and appropriate management, many individuals with congenital cataracts can achieve good visual outcomes and lead fulfilling lives.

== Epidemiology ==
- Congenital cataracts are responsible for nearly 10% of all vision loss in children worldwide.
- Congenital cataracts are one of the most common treatable causes of visual impairment and blindness during infancy, with an estimated prevalence of 1 to 6 cases per 10,000 live births.
