= Samoyed hereditary glomerulopathy =

Medical condition of the dog breed

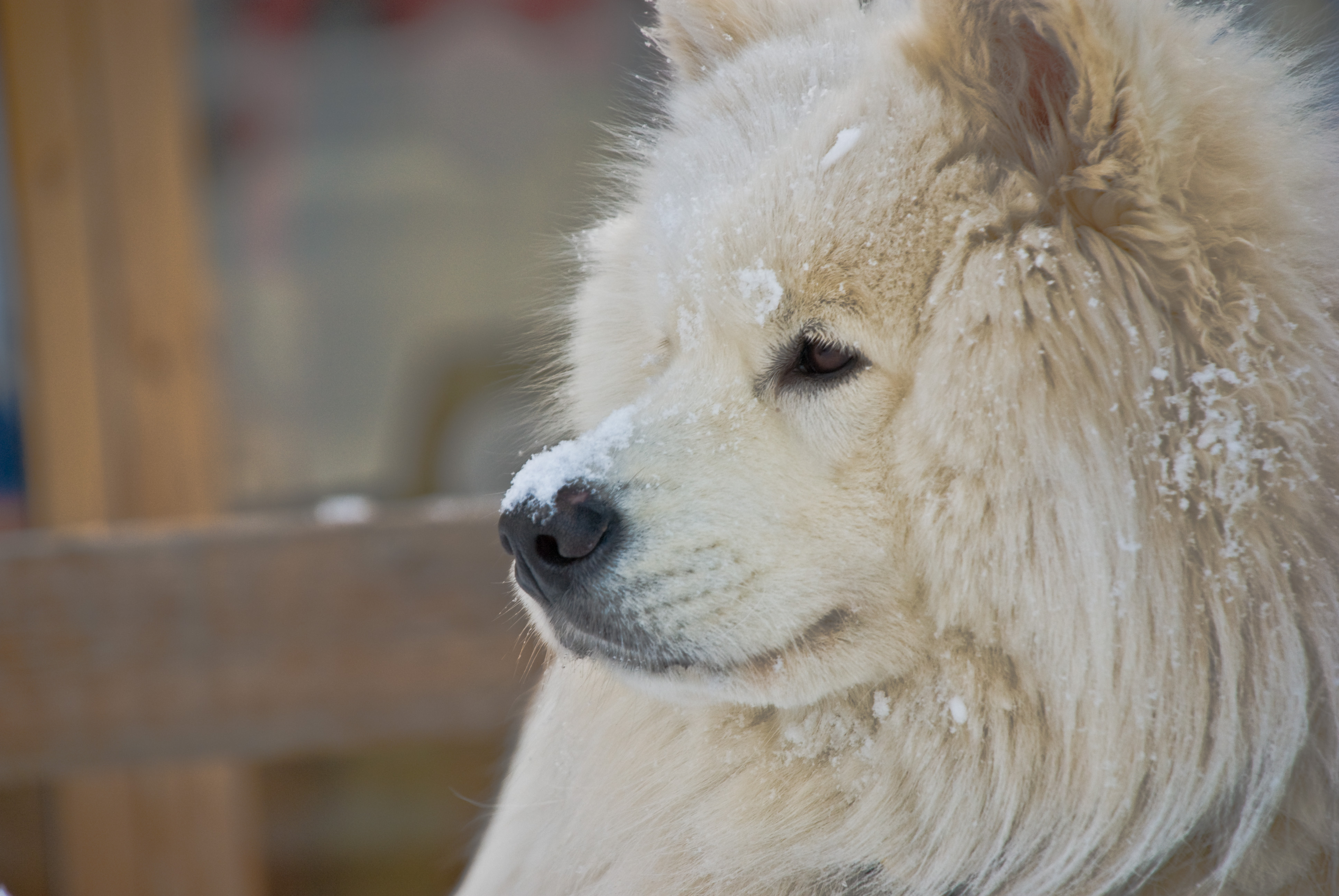
Healthy Samoyed dog

Samoyed hereditary glomerulopathy (SHG) is a hereditary, X-linked, noninflammatory disease of the renal glomeruli, occurring in the Samoyed breed of dog. The disease has been shown to be a model for Alport syndrome in humans in that the disease resembles that of the human disease. Because of this, it is sometimes referred to by the name given to the disease in humans when referring to the conditions in Samoyed dogs. Alternatively, it may also be known as X-linked hereditary nephritis. Genetically, the trait is inherited as a sex-linked, genetically dominant disease, and thus affects male dogs to a greater degree than female dogs, since males only have one X chromosome.

== Description ==
SHG is caused by a nonsense mutation in codon 1027 of the COL4A5 gene on the X chromosome (glycine to stop codon), which is similar to Alport syndrome in humans. The disease is simply inherited, X-linked dominant, with males generally having more severe symptoms than females. Clinically, from the age of three to four months, proteinuria in both sexes is seen. In dogs older than this, kidney failure in combination with more or less pronounced hearing loss occurs swiftly, and death at the age of 8 to 15 months is expected. In heterozygous females, whereby only one of the two X chromosomes carry the mutation, the disease develops slowly.

The disease is specific to the Samoyed, in that the Samoyed is the only breed of dog to show the more rapid progression to kidney failure and death, as well as affecting males to a much more severe degree than females. The Samoyed, however, is not the only breed of dog to suffer from life-threatening renal diseases. Proteinuria has been found consistently in Samoyeds, Doberman Pinschers, and Cocker Spaniels.

== Diagnosis ==
Affected male and carrier female dogs generally begin to show signs of the disease at two to three months of age, with proteinuria. By three to four months of age, symptoms include for affected male dogs: bodily wasting and loss of weight, proteinuria and hypoalbuminemia. Past nine months of age, hypercholesterolemia may be seen. In the final stages of the disease, at around 15 months of age for affected males, symptoms are reported as being kidney failure, hearing loss and death. Since the condition is genetically dominant, diagnosis would also include analysis of the health of the sire and dam of the suspected affected progeny if available.

== Treatment ==
The disease can be treated only to slow down the development, by use of cyclosporine A and ACE inhibitors, but not stopped or cured.
