= Type IV collagen =

Non-fibrillar collagen found in the structure of basement membranes

Collagen IV (ColIV, Col4) is a type of collagen found primarily in the basal lamina. The collagen IV C4 domain at the C-terminus is not removed in post-translational processing, and the fibers link head-to-head, rather than in parallel. Also, collagen IV lacks the regular glycine in every third residue necessary for the tight, collagen helix. This makes the overall arrangement more sloppy with kinks. These two features cause the collagen to form in a sheet, the form of the basal lamina.

Collagen IV is the more common usage, as opposed to the older terminology of "type-IV collagen". Collagen IV exists in all metazoan phyla, to whom it served as an evolutionary stepping stone to multicellularity.

There are six human genes associated with it: COL4A1, COL4A2, COL4A3, COL4A4, COL4A5, and COL4A6.

== Function ==
Type IV collagen is a type of collagen that is responsible for providing a scaffold for stability and assembly. It is also predominantly found in extracellular basement membranes. It aids in cell adhesion, migration, survival, expansion, and differentiation.

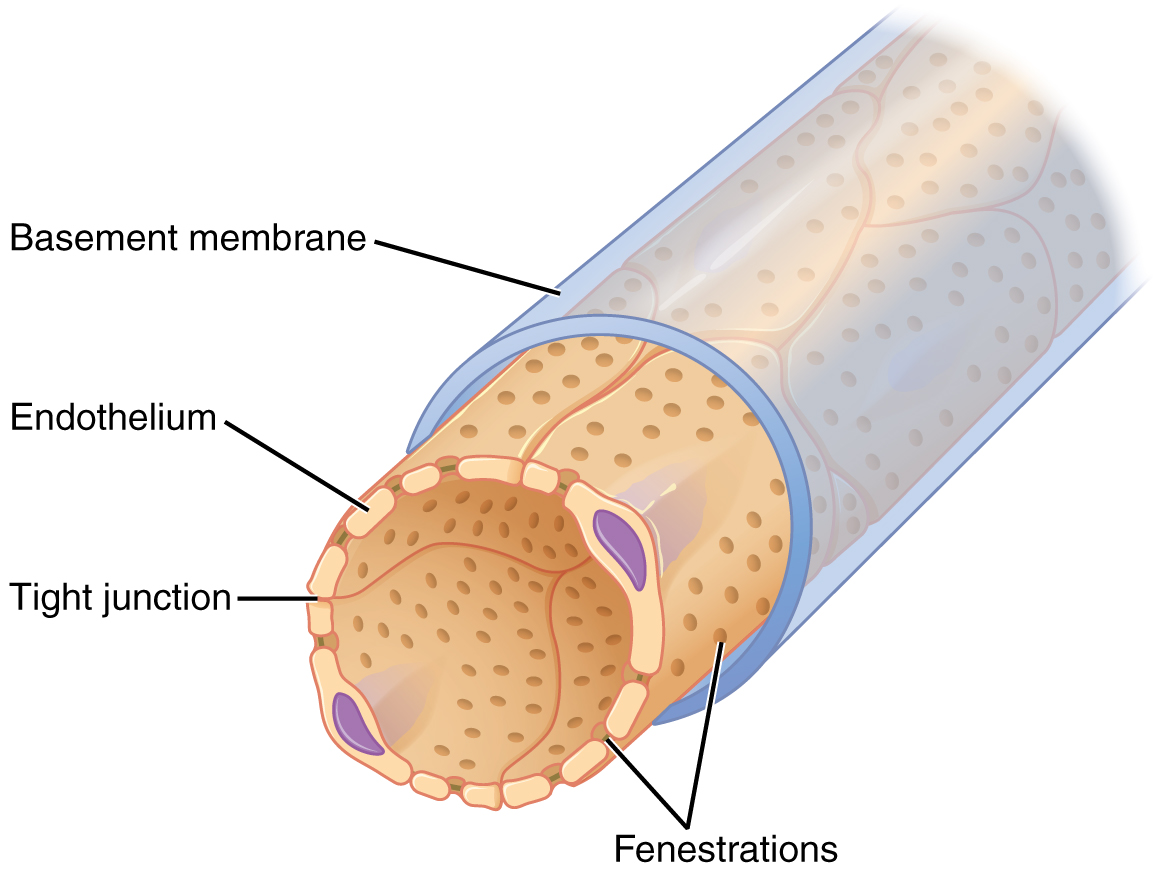

== Synthesis ==
To begin, this type of collagen is synthesized by the assembly of a specific trimer, when the three NC1 domains initiate molecular interactions between the three α-chains. Protomer trimerization then proceeds from the carboxy terminus to yield the fully assembled protomer. The next step in assembly is collagen IV dimerization. Two collagen IV protomers associate through the carboxy-terminal NC1 trimer to form the NC1 hexamer. These interactions form the core of the type IV collagen scaffold. The scaffold evolves into a collagen IV superstructure by "end-to-end" and lateral connections between collagen IV protomers. The collagen molecule is then formed. Lastly, the type IV collagen molecules bind together to form a complex protein network.

To summarize, the process of collagen synthesis occurs mainly in the cells of fibroblasts which are specialized cells with the main function of synthesizing collagen. Collagen synthesis occurs both intracellularly and extracellularly. However, when looking specifically at type IV collagen, it is mostly synthesized extracellularly.

== Structure ==
The C4 Domain at the C-terminus is not removed in the post-translational process, and as a result, the structure of the fibers are linked in a "head-to-head" format instead of in a parallel fashion. It also lacks a glycine in every third amino acid residue that is responsible for the tight collagen helix, as a result it will be more flexible and kinked than other types of collagen.

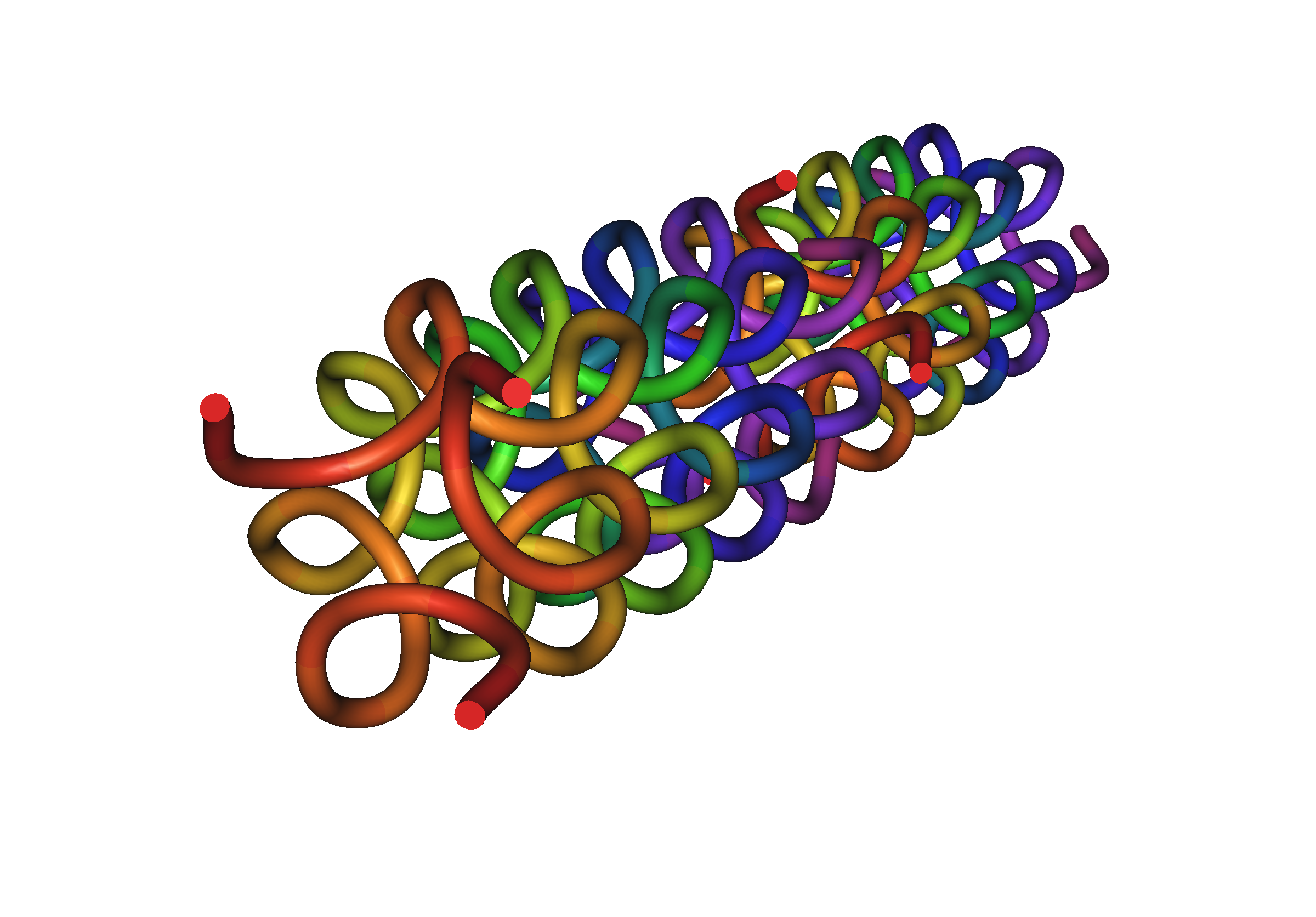
Tight collagen helix

== Differences with type I collagen ==
The most common collagen is type I collagen, which makes up 90% of all collagen. It is found in all dermal layers at high proportions while type IV collagen is only found at the basement membrane of the epidermal junction. Despite their differences in commonality, they are both strongly altered during aging or cancer progression.

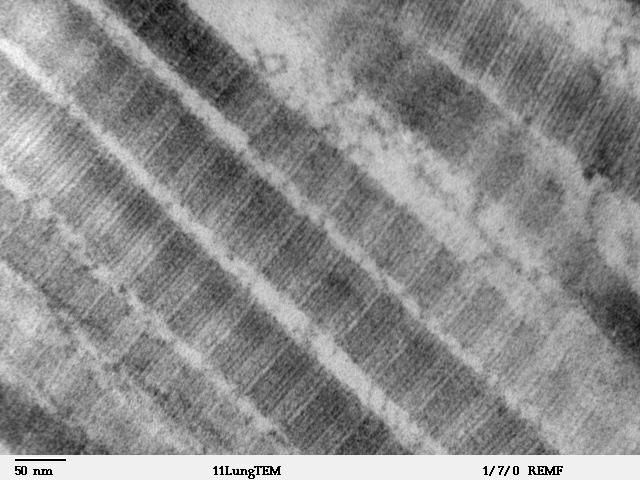
Parallel direction of fibers in Type I

== Clinical significance ==
Depending on genetic and nongenetic factors including alterations in gene expression, splice variations, post-translational modifications, and the chain-specific assembly of particular α-chains, different organs can be affected during their development and in the adult life span.

Collagen IV has been the focus of extensive research ranging from biochemistry perspectives, to pathology, and genetic disorders. This is the only collagen type that is encoded by six different genes. The six α-chains of collagen IV can recognize each other with incredible specificity and will assemble into unique heterotrimers. After secretion into the extracellular membrane, these molecules will further interact to form higher molecular organizations. These, along with other proteins, will form unique basement membranes in tissue-specific manners. Through interactions with specific cellular receptors such as integrins, the basement membrane collagen IV networks not only provide structural support to the cells and tissues, but they also affect the biological rate during and after the development. New discoveries keep unraveling information about genetic mutations, biosynthesis, molecular assembly, and network formation of type IV collagen, and this increases the understanding of the critical role of this collagen in health and disease.

=== Goodpasture syndrome ===
The alpha-3 subunit (COL4A3) of collagen IV is thought to be the antigen implicated in Goodpasture syndrome, wherein the immune system attacks the basement membranes of the glomeruli and the alveoli upon the antigenic site on the alpha-3 subunit becoming unsequestered due to environmental exposures.

Goodpasture syndrome presents with nephritic syndrome and hemoptysis. Microscopic evaluation of biopsied renal tissue will reveal linear deposits of Immunoglobulin G by immunofluorescence. This is classically in young adult males.

=== Alport syndrome ===
Mutations to the genes COL4A3, COL4A4 and/or COL4A5 coding for collagen IV lead to Alport syndrome. This will cause thinning and splitting of the glomerular basement membrane. It may present as isolated hematuria, sensorineural hearing loss, and ocular disturbances and is passed on genetically in an autosomal dominant, autosomal recessive, or X-linked manner.

=== Liver disease ===
Liver fibrosis and cirrhosis are associated with the deposition of collagen IV in the liver. Serum collagen IV concentrations correlate with hepatic tissue levels of collagen IV in subjects with alcoholic liver disease and hepatitis C and fall following successful therapy.

=== HANAC syndrome ===
Mutations in COL4A1 exons 24 and 25 are associated with HANAC (autosomal dominant hereditary angiopathy with nephropathy, aneurysms, and muscle cramps). It has also been confirmed that mutations in the COL4A1 gene occur in some patients with porencephaly and schizencephaly.

=== Congenital cataract ===
In humans, a novel mutation of the COL4A1 gene coding for collagen type IV was found to be associated with autosomal dominant congenital cataract in a Chinese family. This mutation was not found in unaffected family members or in 200 unrelated controls. In this study, sequence analysis confirmed that the Gly782 amino acid residue was highly conserved. This report of a new mutation in the COL4A1 gene is the first report of a non-syndromic autosomal dominant congenital cataract that highlights an important role for collagen type IV in the physiological and optical properties of the lens.

=== Cardiovascular disease ===
Type IV collagen is a main component of basement membranes in various tissues (arteries included).

Over the past decade, studies have repeatedly found single-nucleotide polymorphisms located in the collagen (COL) 4A1 and COL4A2 genes to be associated with cardiovascular disease, and the 13q34 locus harboring these genes is one of the 160 genome-wide significant risk loci for coronary artery disease. COL4A1 and COL4A2 encode the α1- and α2-chains of collagen type IV. This is a major component of basement membranes in various tissues including arteries. There are clinical reports linking 13q34 to coronary artery disease, atherosclerosis, and artery stiffening from experimental studies based on vascular cells and tissue.

Additionally, in the cardiovascular field, the COL4A1 and COL4A2 regions on chromosome 13q34 are a highly replicated locus for coronary artery disease. In a normal wall of arteries, collagen type IV acts to inhibit smooth muscle cell proliferation. Accordingly, it was demonstrated that protein expression of collagen type IV in human vascular smooth muscle cells is regulated by both SMAD3 protein and TGFβ mediated stimulation of mRNA. Altogether, it was concluded that the pathogenesis of coronary artery disease may be regulated by COL4A1 and COL4A2 genes.

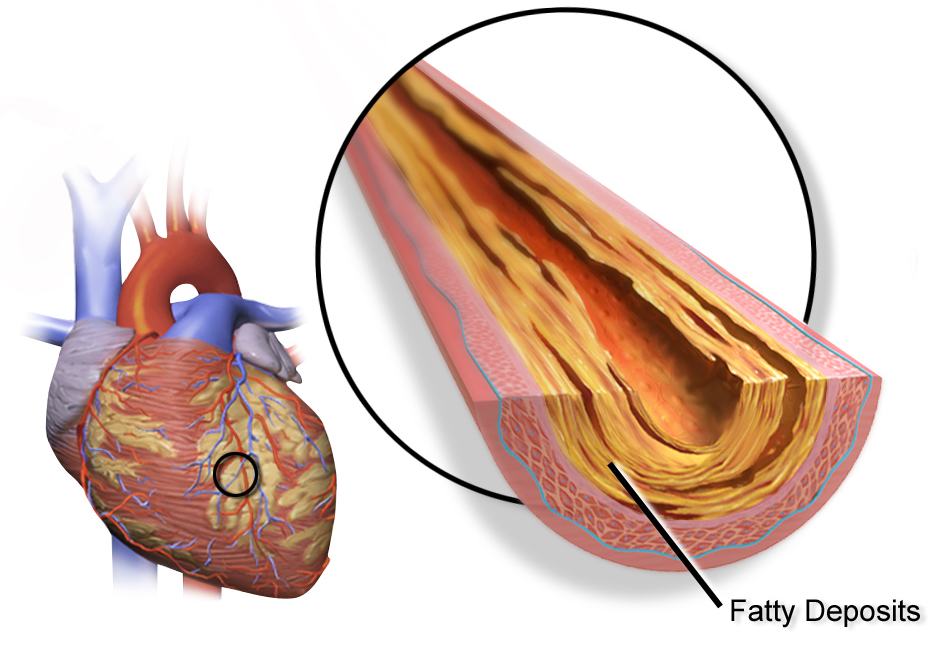
Fatty deposits causing coronary artery plaque

=== Pancreatic cancer cells ===
This type of collagen can cause an increase in pancreatic cancer cells and is able to inhibit apoptosis through an autocrine loop.

This autocrine loop provides essential cell survival signals to the pancreatic cancer cells.

Type IV collagen is expressed close to the cancer cells in vivo, forming basement membrane like structures on the cancer cell surface that colocalize with the integrin receptors. The interaction between type IV collagen produced by the cancer cell, and integrins on the surface of the cancer cells, are important for continuous cancer cell growth, maintenance of a migratory phenotype, and for avoiding apoptosis.

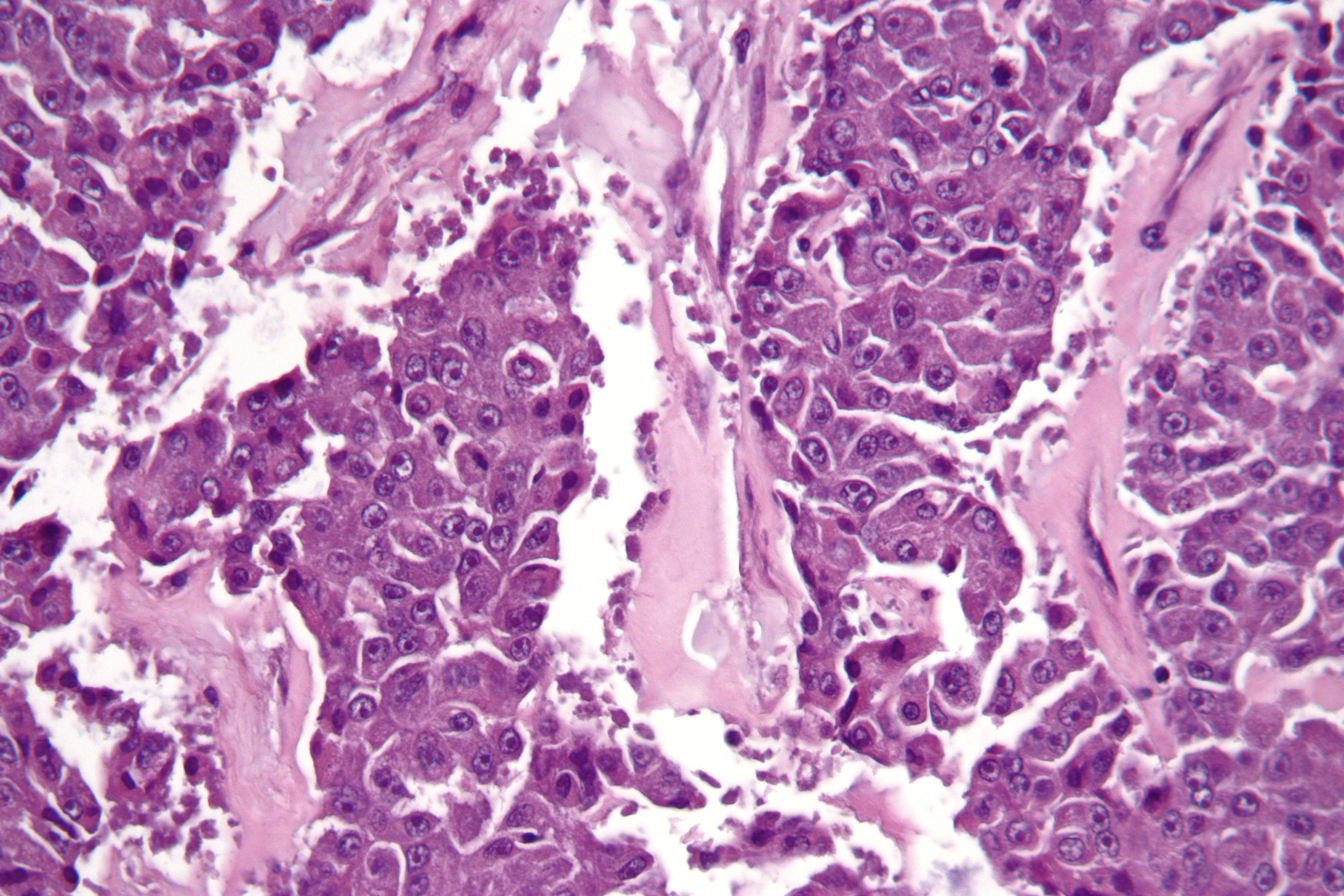
Pancreatic cancer cell in high magnification

=== Scurvy ===
Scurvy is a nutritional deficiency of water-soluble vitamin C or ascorbic acid. It is rare in the developing world and is mostly seen in infants, the elderly, and alcoholics, all who may have inadequate nutritional intake and malnutrition.

Patients may present with general fatigue, weakness, poor wound healing, anemia, and gum disease. Clinically, one of the first signs of scurvy occurs on the skin and manifests as perifollicular hemorrhage where follicles of the skin are plugged with keratin. These areas appear as bruise-like spots around the hair follicles. There can also be fragile hairs arranged in a corkscrew confirmation.

A lack of ascorbic acid leads to epigenetic DNA hypermethylation and inhibits the transcription of various types of collagen found in skin, blood vessels, and tissue.

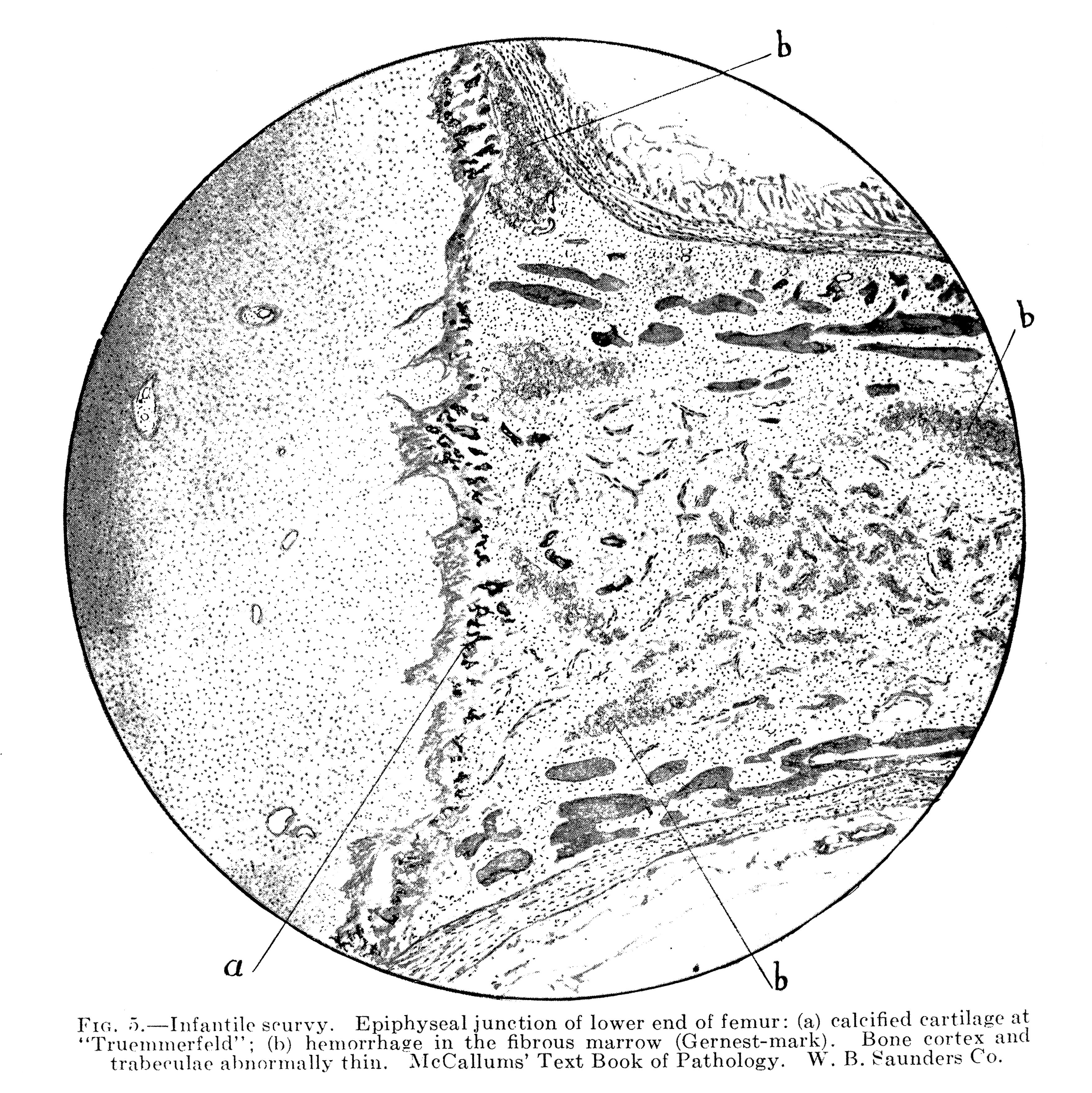
Calcified cartilage, hemorrhage in fibrous marrow, and abnormally thin bone cortex due to scurvy

=== Collagen hybridizing peptides ===
Collagen, the major structural component of nearly all mammalian tissues, undergoes extensive proteolytic remodeling during developmental states and a variety of life-threatening diseases such as cancer, myocardial infarction, and fibrosis. While degraded collagen could be an important marker of tissue damage, it is difficult to detect and target using conventional tools. As a result, a collagen hybridizing peptide is specifically hybridized to the degraded, unfolded collagen chains, can be used to image degraded collagen and inform tissue remodeling activity in various tissues.

Labeled with 5-carboxyfluorescein and biotin, the collagen hybridizing peptide can enable direct localization and quantification of collagen degradation in isolated tissues within pathologic states ranging from osteoarthritis and myocardial infarction, to glomerulonephritis and pulmonary fibrosis, as well as in normal tissues during developmental programs associated with embryonic bone formation and skin aging.

The general correlation between the level of collagen remodeling and the amount of denatured collagen in tissue, show that the collagen hybridizing peptide probes can be used across species and collagen types (including type IV collagen), providing a versatile tool for not only pathology and developmental biology research, but also disease diagnosis via histology.

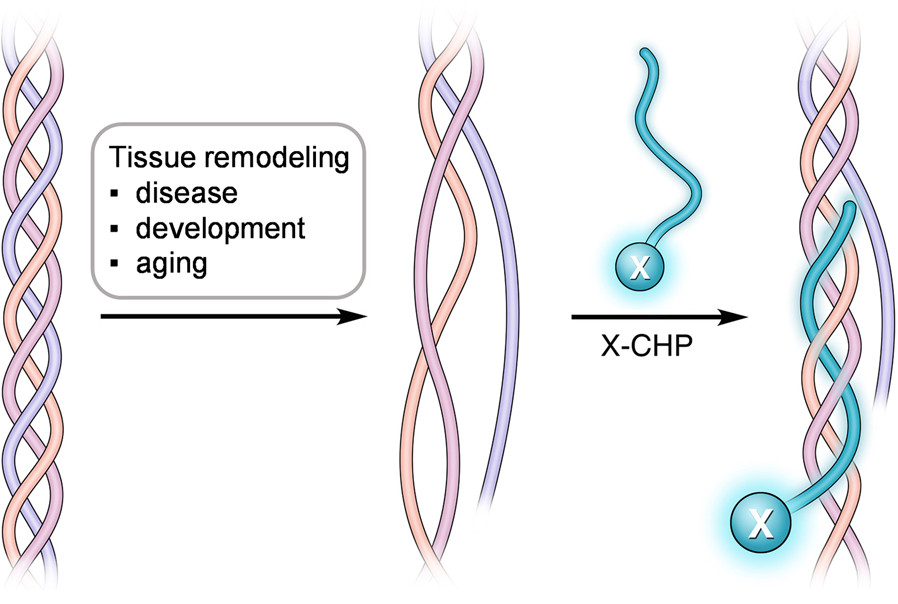
Collagen hybridizing peptides

An autosomal recessive encephalopathy associated with mutations in this gene has also been reported.

Increased glomerular and mesangial deposition of collagen IV occurs in diabetic nephropathy and increased urinary levels are associated with the extent of renal injury.

== See also ==
- Spongin, a variant of this collagen type found in some animals
