= Type IV collagen C4 domain =

C4
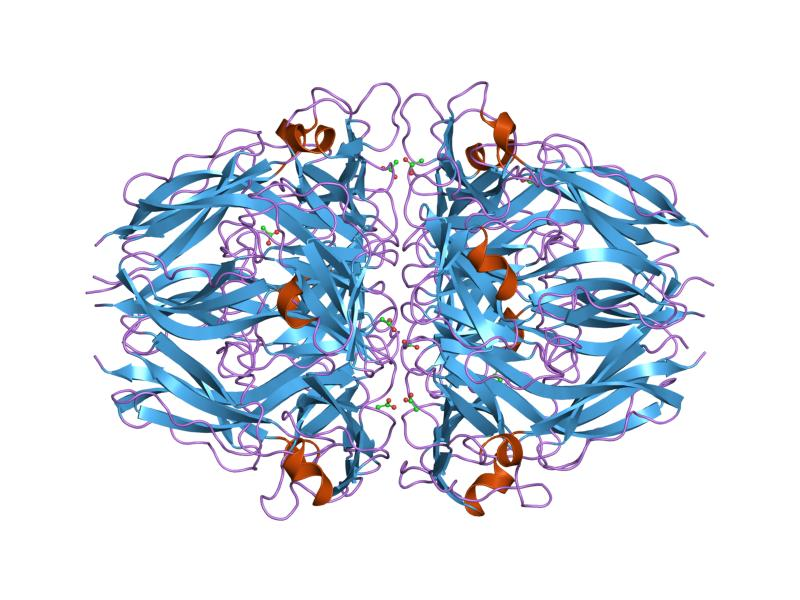
- the 1.9-a crystal structure of the noncollagenous (nc1) domain of human placenta collagen iv shows stabilization via a novel type of covalent met-lys cross-link

Identifiers
- Symbol: C4
- Pfam: PF01413
- Pfam clan: CL0056
- InterPro: IPR001442
- SMART: C4
- PROSITE: PDOC00031
- MEROPS: C47
- SCOP2: 1hra / SCOPe / SUPFAM
- TCDB: 2.A.16
Available protein structures:
- PDB: IPR001442 PF01413 (ECOD; PDBsum)
- AlphaFold: IPR001442; PF01413

In molecular biology, the type IV collagen C4 domain (or collagen IV NC1 domain) is a duplicated domain present at the C-terminus of type IV collagens. Each type IV collagen contains a long triple-helical collagenous domain flanked by a short 7S domain of 25 amino acids and a globular non-collagenous C4 domain of ~230 amino acids at the N and C terminus, respectively. In protomer assembly, the C4 domains of three chains interact, forming a C4 trimer, to select and register chains for triple helix formation. In network assembly, the C4 trimers of two protomers interact, forming a C4 hexamer structure, to select and connect protomers.

The collagen IV C4 domain contains 12 cysteines, and all of them are involved in disulphide bonds. It folds into a tertiary structure with predominantly beta-strands. The collagen IV C4 domain is composed of two similarly folded subdomains stabilised by three intrachain disulphide bonds involving the following pairs: C1-C6, C2-C5, and C3-C4. Each subdomain represents a compact disulphide-stabilised triangular structure, from which a finger-like hairpin loop projects into an incompletely formed six-stranded beta-sheet of an adjacent subdomain of the same or of an adjacent chain clamping the subdomains tightly together.
