= Collagen, type IV, alpha 6 =

Mammalian protein found in humans

COL4A6

Identifiers
- Aliases: COL4A6, CXDELq22.3, DELXq22.3, DFNX6, collagen type IV alpha 6, collagen type IV alpha 6 chain
- External IDs: OMIM: 303631; MGI: 2152695; GeneCards: COL4A6

Gene location (Human)
Chr.	X chromosome (human)
Band	Xq22.3	Start	108,155,607 bp
Band	Xq22.3	End	108,439,497 bp

Gene location (Mouse)
Chr.	X chromosome (mouse)
Band	X|X F1- F2	Start	139,948,399 bp
Band	X|X F1- F2	End	140,257,072 bp
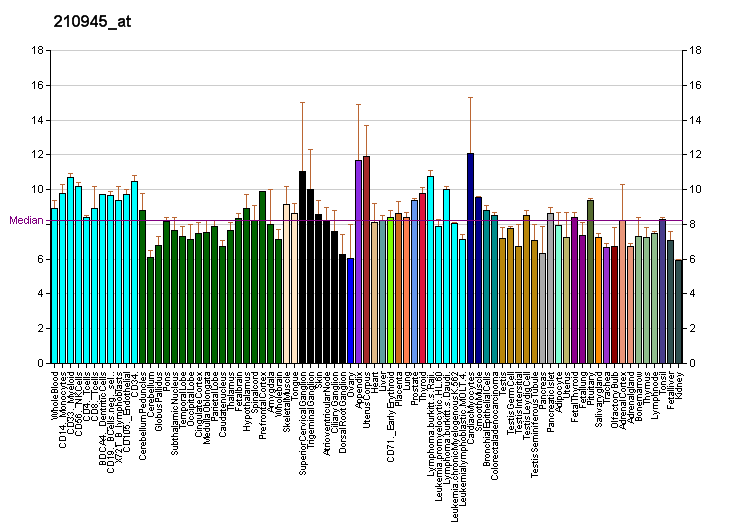

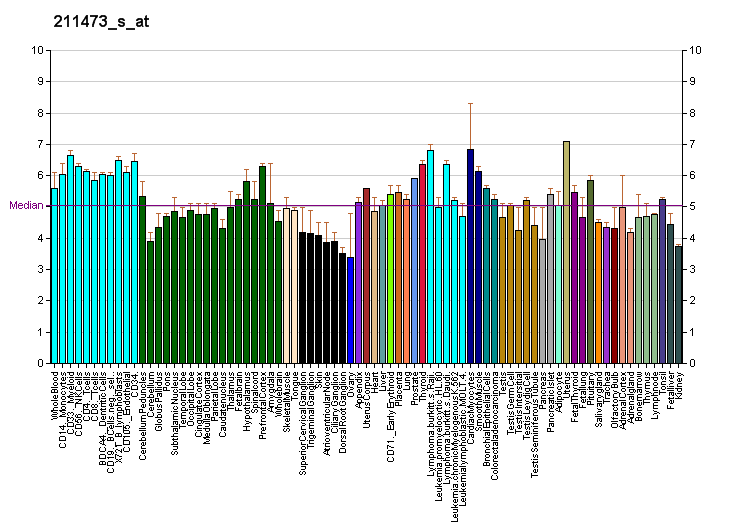

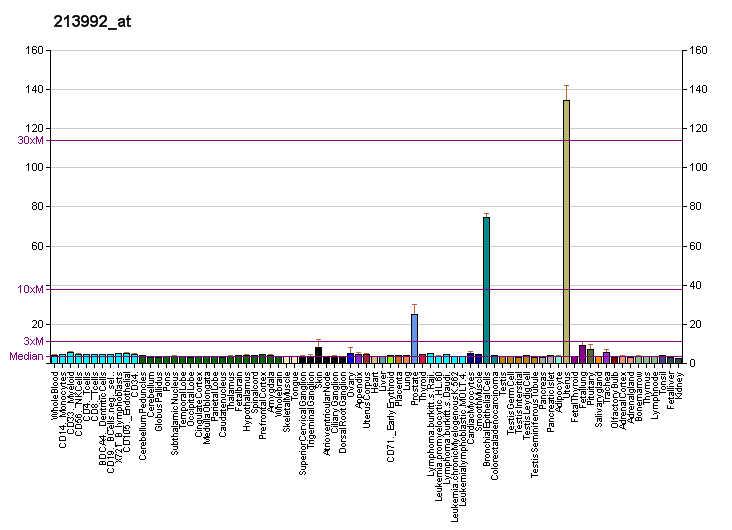
RNA expression pattern
Bgee	Human / Mouse (ortholog); Top expressed in: gastric mucosa; ventricular zone; seminal vesicula; urethra; urinary bladder; body of uterus; left uterine tube; mucosa of urinary bladder; tail of epididymis; decidua / Top expressed in: lens; uterus; urinary bladder; mesonephros; facial skeleton; neurocranium; skeleton; membranous bone; Dermatocranium; mandible; More reference expression data
BioGPS	More reference expression data
Gene ontology
Molecular function	extracellular matrix structural constituent; extracellular matrix structural constituent conferring tensile strength
Cellular component	collagen type IV trimer; endoplasmic reticulum lumen; basement membrane; collagen; extracellular region; extracellular space; extracellular matrix; collagen-containing extracellular matrix
Biological process	cell adhesion; extracellular matrix organization; collagen-activated tyrosine kinase receptor signaling pathway
Sources:Amigo / QuickGO
Orthologs
Databases	NCBI: entry; OMA: entry
Species	Human	Mouse
Entrez	1288	94216
Ensembl	ENSG00000197565	ENSMUSG00000031273
UniProt	Q14031	n/a
RefSeq (mRNA)	NM_001287758; NM_001287759; NM_001287760; NM_001847; NM_033641	NM_053185
RefSeq (protein)	NP_001274687; NP_001274688; NP_001274689; NP_001838; NP_378667 NP_001274688.1	n/a
Location (UCSC)	Chr X: 108.16 – 108.44 Mb	Chr X: 139.95 – 140.26 Mb
PubMed search
- Wikidata
View/Edit Human	View/Edit Mouse

Collagen alpha-6(IV) chain is a protein that in humans is encoded by the COL4A6 gene.

This gene encodes one of the six subunits of type IV collagen, the major structural component of basement membranes. Like the other members of the type IV collagen gene family, this gene is organized in a head-to-head conformation with another type IV collagen gene, alpha 5 type IV collagen, so that the gene pair shares a common promoter. Deletions in the alpha 5 gene that extend into the alpha 6 gene result in diffuse leiomyomatosis accompanying the X-linked Alport syndrome caused by the deletion in the alpha 5 gene. Two splice variants have been identified for this gene.
