= PITX3 =

Protein-coding gene

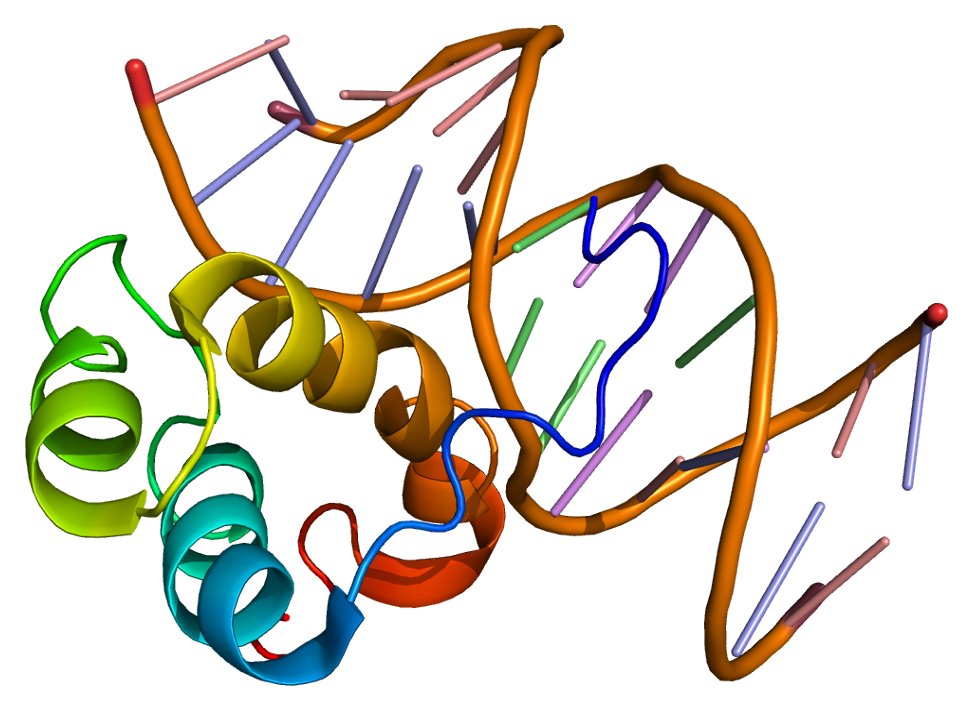

Identifiers
- Aliases: PITX3, ASMD, ASOD, CTPP4, CTRCT11, PTX3, paired like homeodomain 3, ASGD1
- External IDs: OMIM: 602669; MGI: 1100498; GeneCards: PITX3

Gene location (Mouse)
Chr.	Chromosome 19 (mouse)
Band	19 C3|19 38.75 cM	Start	46,124,124 bp
Band	19 C3|19 38.75 cM	End	46,136,765 bp
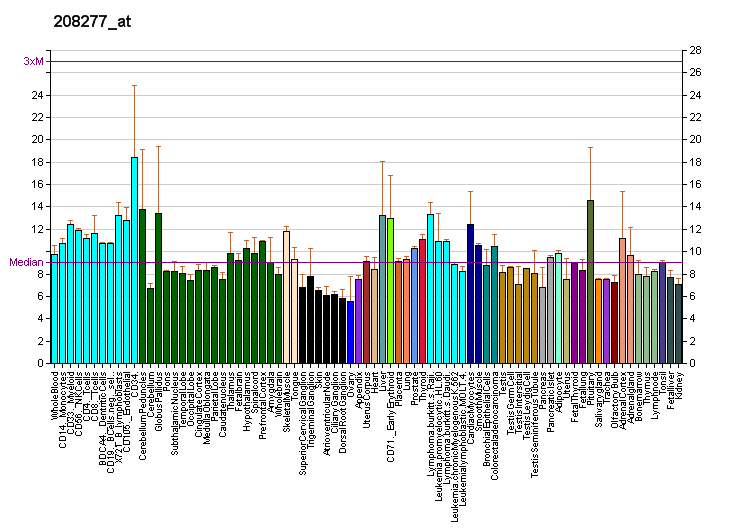
RNA expression pattern
Bgee	Human / Mouse (ortholog); Top expressed in: gastrocnemius muscle; skeletal muscle tissue; ventricle of the heart; left ventricle; mesencephalon; substantia nigra; face; sensory nervous system; sensory organ; kidney / Top expressed in: lens; muscle of thigh; embryo; lip; female urethra; male urethra; lens placode; temporal muscle; embryo; internal carotid artery; More reference expression data
BioGPS	More reference expression data
Gene ontology
Molecular function	RNA polymerase II cis-regulatory region sequence-specific DNA binding; DNA-binding transcription factor activity; DNA binding; sequence-specific DNA binding; DNA-binding transcription activator activity, RNA polymerase II-specific; DNA-binding transcription factor activity, RNA polymerase II-specific
Cellular component	nucleus; soma
Biological process	animal organ morphogenesis; positive regulation of transcription, DNA-templated; multicellular organism development; dopaminergic neuron differentiation; regulation of gene expression; neuron development; lens development in camera-type eye; regulation of transcription, DNA-templated; lens fiber cell differentiation; lens morphogenesis in camera-type eye; transcription by RNA polymerase II; locomotory behavior; midbrain development; positive regulation of transcription by RNA polymerase II; transcription, DNA-templated; ageing; negative regulation of gliogenesis; response to immobilization stress; response to cocaine; response to morphine; positive regulation of neuron apoptotic process; negative regulation of neurogenesis; response to methamphetamine hydrochloride; positive regulation of cell proliferation in midbrain; cellular response to glial cell derived neurotrophic factor; anatomical structure morphogenesis
Sources:Amigo / QuickGO
Orthologs
Databases	NCBI: entry
Species	Human	Mouse
Entrez	5309	18742
Ensembl	n/a	ENSMUSG00000025229
UniProt	O75364	O35160
RefSeq (mRNA)	NM_005029	NM_008852
RefSeq (protein)	NP_005020	NP_032878
Location (UCSC)	n/a	Chr 19: 46.12 – 46.14 Mb
PubMed search
- Wikidata
View/Edit Human	View/Edit Mouse

Pituitary homeobox 3 is a protein that in humans is encoded by the PITX3 gene.

== Function ==
This gene encodes a member of the RIEG/PITX homeobox family, which is in the bicoid class of homeodomain proteins. Members of this family act as transcription factors. This protein is involved in lens formation during eye development, and the specification and terminal differentiation of mesencephalic dopamine neurons in the substantia nigra compacta that are lost in Parkinson's disease.

== Clinical significance ==
Mutations of this gene have been associated with anterior segment mesenchymal dysgenesis (ASMD) and congenital cataracts.
