= Arthur Cecil Alport =

South African doctor and discoverer of Alport Syndrome

- Born: 1880
- Died: 1959 (aged about 79); London
- Citizenship: South African
- Education: University of Edinburgh Medical School (MB ChB, 1905; MD 1919)
- Known for: Identification of Alport syndrome; One Hour of Justice: The Black Book of the Egyptian Hospitals
- Scientific career
- Fields: Physician
- Workplaces: Ministry of Pensions, London; St. Mary's Hospital, Paddington; King Fuad I Hospital, University of Cairo

Arthur Cecil Alport, M.D. (1880–1959) was a South African physician who first identified the Alport syndrome in a British family in 1927.

== Biography ==
After graduating in medicine from the University of Edinburgh Medical School with an MB ChB in 1905, he returned to Transvaal Colony to practice medicine in Johannesburg, where he owned a small gold mine. However, this proved to be non-productive.

During World War I Alport served with the Royal Army Medical Corps in South West Africa and in Macedonia and Salonika. After the war Alport received his MD by thesis in 1919 from the University of Edinburgh Medical School. Alport worked as a specialist in tropical medicine at the Ministry of Pensions, London. From 1922 he worked for fourteen years under professor Frederick Samuel Langmead (1879-1969) as assistant director of the newly established medical unit at St. Mary's Hospital, Paddington.

On the advice of Sir Alexander Fleming (1881-1955), Dr. Alport, in 1937, went to Cairo to become professor of medicine at the King Fuad I Hospital, University of Cairo. He was appalled by the fraudulent practices of dishonesty and corruption, which he encountered in Egyptian hospitals at the time, but even more so of the neglect of the poor patients, and it was entirely in keeping with his moral integrity that he initiated a crusade of reformation.

These conditions were the theme of his book One Hour of Justice: The Black Book of the Egyptian Hospitals, a privately published pamphlet, which he dedicated to the twin gods of decency and justice - and ultimately had the desired effect as a bill for the reform of the Egyptian medical faculty. It was presented to the Legislature in 1944. Alport remained unconvinced that he had succeeded and came to believe that he had been let down by British colleagues. In 1947 this sense of betrayal led him to resign from the fellowship of the Royal College of Physicians of London. He died in his old hospital in London in 1959, at the age of 79 years.

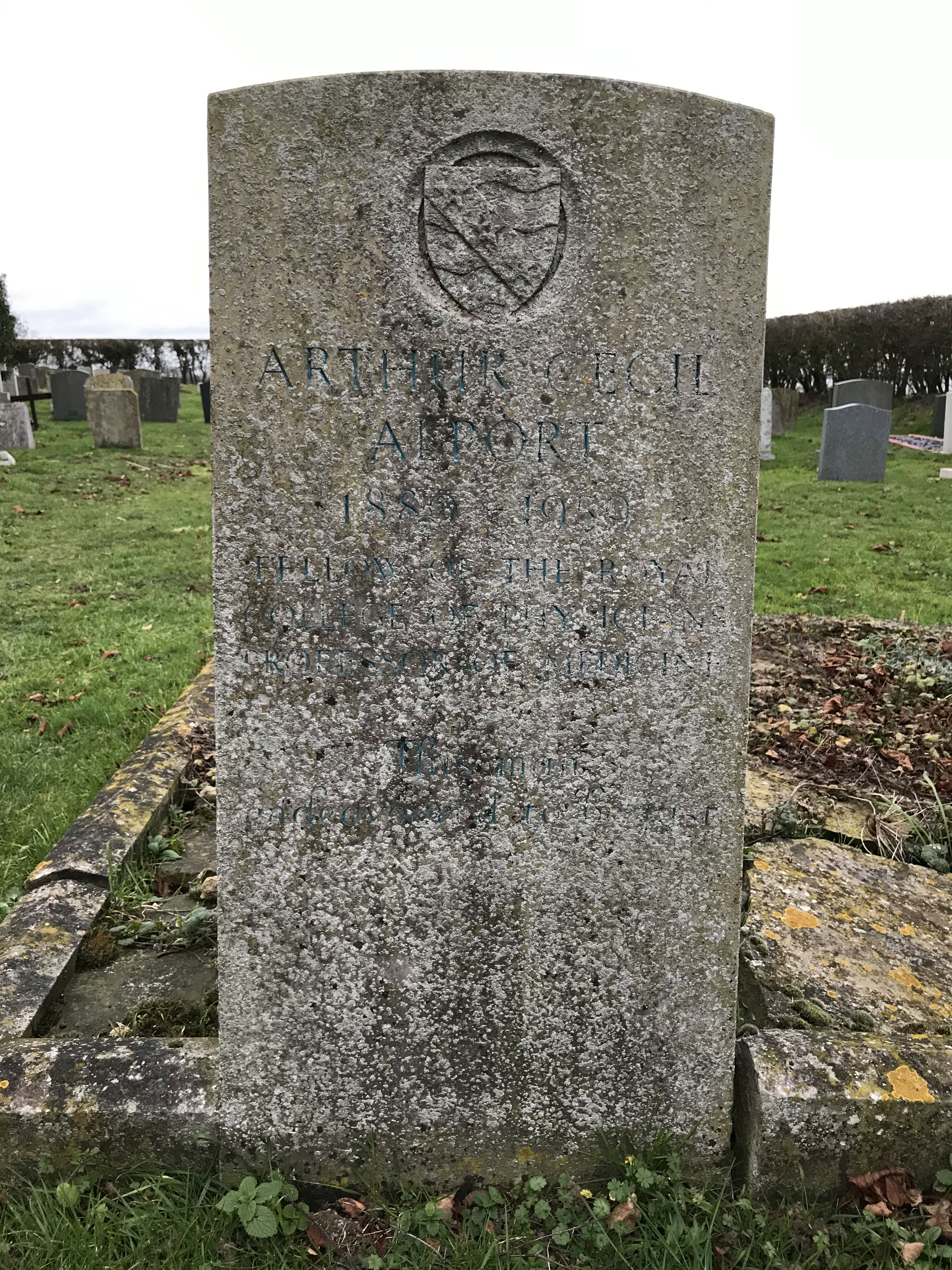
The grave of Arthur Cecil Alport in the churchyard of St John the Baptist, Layer de la Haye, Essex.
