= Collagen, type IV, alpha 3 =

Protein found in humans

COL4A3

Identifiers
- Aliases: COL4A3, collagen type IV alpha 3 chain, ATS2, ATS3
- External IDs: OMIM: 120070; MGI: 104688; GeneCards: COL4A3

Gene location (Human)
Chr.	Chromosome 2 (human)
Band	2q36.3	Start	227,164,624 bp
Band	2q36.3	End	227,314,792 bp

Gene location (Mouse)
Chr.	Chromosome 1 (mouse)
Band	1|1 C5	Start	82,564,642 bp
Band	1|1 C5	End	82,699,780 bp
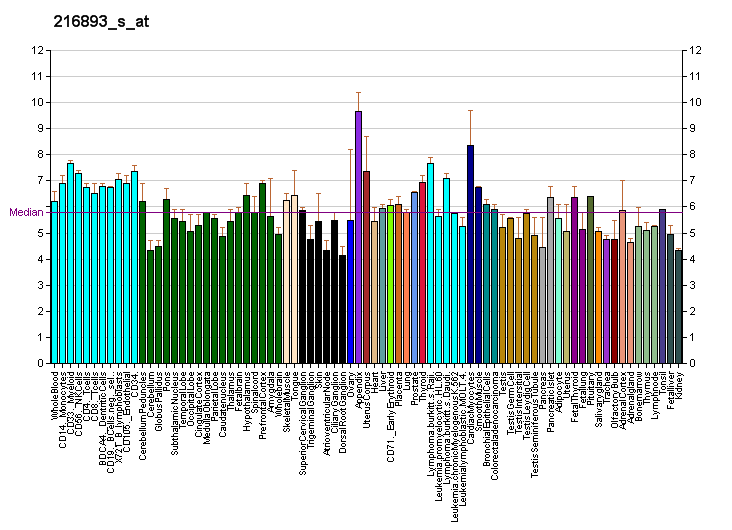

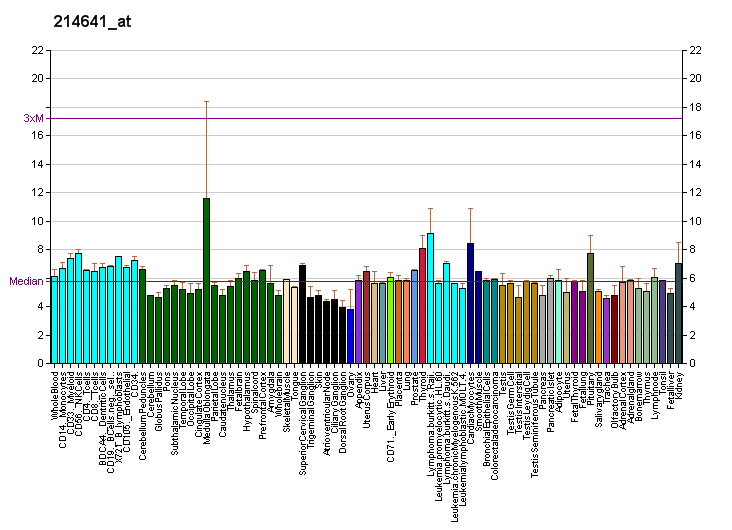

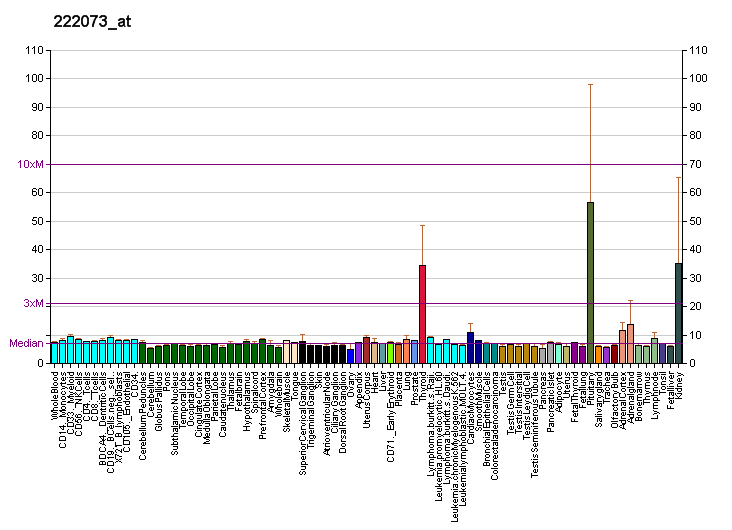
RNA expression pattern
Bgee	Human / Mouse (ortholog); Top expressed in: Skeletal muscle tissue of biceps brachii; retinal pigment epithelium; glutes; renal medulla; endothelial cell; glomerulus; triceps brachii muscle; optic nerve; metanephric glomerulus; buccal mucosa cell / Top expressed in: epithelium of lens; retinal pigment epithelium; right lung; right lung lobe; right kidney; human kidney; left lung; left lung lobe; aortic valve; iris; More reference expression data
BioGPS	More reference expression data
Gene ontology
Molecular function	extracellular matrix structural constituent; structural molecule activity; protein binding; metalloendopeptidase inhibitor activity; integrin binding; extracellular matrix structural constituent conferring tensile strength
Cellular component	collagen; endoplasmic reticulum lumen; intracellular membrane-bounded organelle; endoplasmic reticulum; extracellular region; basement membrane; collagen type IV trimer; extracellular space; extracellular matrix; collagen-containing extracellular matrix
Biological process	extracellular matrix organization; hearing; blood circulation; cell adhesion; endothelial cell apoptotic process; cell population proliferation; activation of cysteine-type endopeptidase activity involved in apoptotic process; negative regulation of cell population proliferation; cell surface receptor signaling pathway; negative regulation of endopeptidase activity; negative regulation of angiogenesis; glomerular basement membrane development; collagen-activated tyrosine kinase receptor signaling pathway; response to glucose
Sources:Amigo / QuickGO
Orthologs
Databases	NCBI: entry; OMA: entry
Species	Human	Mouse
Entrez	1285	12828
Ensembl	ENSG00000169031	ENSMUSG00000079465
UniProt	Q01955	Q9QZS0
RefSeq (mRNA)	NM_000091; NM_031362; NM_031363; NM_031364; NM_031365 NM_031366	NM_007734
RefSeq (protein)	NP_000082	NP_031760
Location (UCSC)	Chr 2: 227.16 – 227.31 Mb	Chr 1: 82.56 – 82.7 Mb
PubMed search
- Wikidata
View/Edit Human	View/Edit Mouse

Collagen alpha-3(IV) chain is a protein that in humans is encoded by the COL4A3 gene.

Type IV collagen, the major structural component of basement membranes, is a multimeric protein composed of three alpha subunits; this gene encodes the alpha 3 subunit. These subunits are encoded by six different genes, alpha 1 through alpha 6, each of which can form a triple helix structure with two other subunits to form type IV collagen. In Goodpasture's syndrome, autoantibodies bind to the collagen molecules in the basement membranes of alveoli and glomeruli. The epitopes that elicit these autoantibodies are localized largely to the non-collagenous C-terminal domain of the protein. A specific kinase phosphorylates amino acids in this same C-terminal region and the expression of this kinase is upregulated during pathogenesis. There are multiple alternate transcripts that appear to be unique to this human alpha 3 gene and alternate splicing is restricted to the six exons that encode this C-terminal domain. This gene is also linked to an autosomal recessive form of Alport syndrome. The mutations contributing to this syndrome are also located within the exons that encode this C-terminal region. Like the other members of the type IV collagen gene family, this gene is organized in a head-to-head conformation with another type IV collagen gene so that each gene pair shares a common promoter. Some exons of this gene are interspersed with exons of an uncharacterized gene which is on the opposite strand.

== Disease Database ==
LOVD Alport gene variant databases (COL4A3, COL4A4, COL4A5)
