= Collagen, type IV, alpha 5 =

Protein-coding gene in humans

COL4A5

Identifiers
- Aliases: COL4A5, ASLN, ATS, CA54, collagen type IV alpha 5, collagen type IV alpha 5 chain, ATS1
- External IDs: OMIM: 303630; MGI: 88456; GeneCards: COL4A5

Gene location (Human)
Chr.	X chromosome (human)
Band	Xq22.3	Start	108,439,838 bp
Band	Xq22.3	End	108,697,545 bp

Gene location (Mouse)
Chr.	X chromosome (mouse)
Band	X F2|X 62.16 cM	Start	140,258,381 bp
Band	X F2|X 62.16 cM	End	140,472,230 bp
RNA expression pattern
Bgee	Human / Mouse (ortholog); Top expressed in: gastric mucosa; ventricular zone; seminal vesicula; corpus callosum; body of uterus; urethra; tail of epididymis; right uterine tube; inferior ganglion of vagus nerve; left uterine tube / Top expressed in: epithelium of lens; ascending aorta; iris; left lung lobe; vas deferens; atrium; aortic valve; tunica media of zone of aorta; vestibular sensory epithelium; ciliary body; More reference expression data
BioGPS	n/a
Gene ontology
Molecular function	extracellular matrix structural constituent; extracellular matrix structural constituent conferring tensile strength
Cellular component	extracellular region; basement membrane; neuromuscular junction; collagen; collagen type IV trimer; endoplasmic reticulum lumen; extracellular space; extracellular matrix; collagen-containing extracellular matrix
Biological process	extracellular matrix organization; neuromuscular junction development; collagen-activated tyrosine kinase receptor signaling pathway
Sources:Amigo / QuickGO
Orthologs
Databases	NCBI: entry; OMA: entry
Species	Human	Mouse
Entrez	1287	12830
Ensembl	ENSG00000188153	ENSMUSG00000031274
UniProt	P29400	n/a
RefSeq (mRNA)	NM_000495; NM_033380; NM_033381	NM_001163155; NM_007736
RefSeq (protein)	NP_000486; NP_203699	n/a
Location (UCSC)	Chr X: 108.44 – 108.7 Mb	Chr X: 140.26 – 140.47 Mb
PubMed search
- Wikidata
View/Edit Human	View/Edit Mouse

Collagen alpha-5(IV) chain is a protein that in humans is encoded by the COL4A5 gene.

This gene encodes one of the six subunits of type IV collagen, the major structural component of basement membranes. Mutations in this gene are associated with X-linked Alport syndrome, also known as hereditary nephritis. Like the other members of the type IV collagen gene family, this gene is organized in a head-to-head conformation with another type IV collagen gene so that each gene pair shares a common promoter. Three transcript variants have been identified for this gene.

== Disease Databases ==
ARUP COL4A5 gene variant database

LOVD Alport gene variant databases (COL4A5, COL4A3, COL4A4)

== See also ==
- Collagen
- Type-IV collagen
- Alport syndrome
