= Collagen, type IV, alpha 4 =

Protein found in humans

COL4A4

Identifiers
- Aliases: COL4A4, CA44, collagen type IV alpha 4, collagen type IV alpha 4 chain, BFH, ATS2
- External IDs: OMIM: 120131; MGI: 104687; GeneCards: COL4A4

Gene location (Human)
Chr.	Chromosome 2 (human)
Band	2q36.3	Start	227,002,714 bp
Band	2q36.3	End	227,164,453 bp

Gene location (Mouse)
Chr.	Chromosome 1 (mouse)
Band	1|1 C5	Start	82,426,144 bp
Band	1|1 C5	End	82,564,570 bp
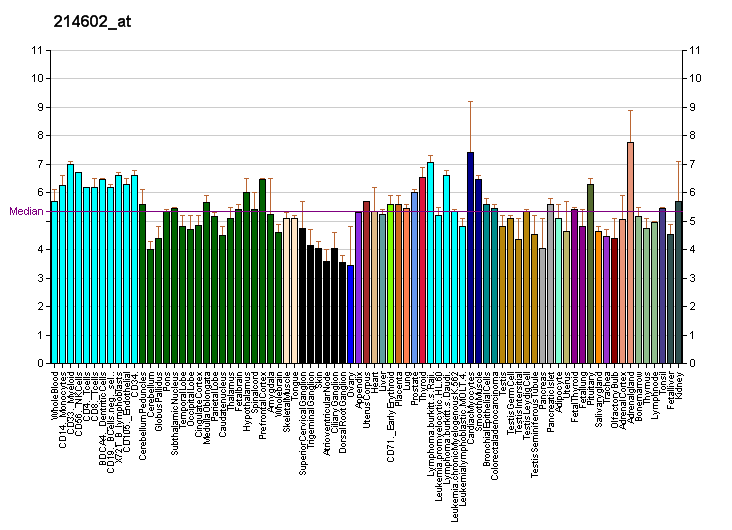
RNA expression pattern
Bgee	Human / Mouse (ortholog); Top expressed in: renal medulla; retinal pigment epithelium; tail of epididymis; right coronary artery; left coronary artery; caput epididymis; visceral pleura; ascending aorta; right auricle of heart; human kidney / Top expressed in: epithelium of lens; right lung lobe; retinal pigment epithelium; left lung lobe; efferent ductule; iris; vestibular membrane of cochlear duct; human kidney; right kidney; ciliary body; More reference expression data
BioGPS	More reference expression data
Gene ontology
Molecular function	extracellular matrix structural constituent; extracellular matrix structural constituent conferring tensile strength
Cellular component	extracellular region; basement membrane; collagen; collagen type IV trimer; endoplasmic reticulum lumen; extracellular space; extracellular matrix; collagen-containing extracellular matrix
Biological process	extracellular matrix organization; glomerular basement membrane development; angiogenesis; endothelial cell morphogenesis
Sources:Amigo / QuickGO
Orthologs
Databases	NCBI: entry; OMA: entry
Species	Human	Mouse
Entrez	1286	12829
Ensembl	ENSG00000081052	ENSMUSG00000067158
UniProt	P53420	Q9QZR9
RefSeq (mRNA)	NM_000092	NM_007735
RefSeq (protein)	NP_000083	NP_031761
Location (UCSC)	Chr 2: 227 – 227.16 Mb	Chr 1: 82.43 – 82.56 Mb
PubMed search
- Wikidata
View/Edit Human	View/Edit Mouse

Collagen alpha-4(IV) chain is a protein that in humans is encoded by the COL4A4 gene.

This gene encodes one of the six subunits of type IV collagen, the major structural component of basement membranes. This particular collagen IV subunit, however, is only found in a subset of basement membranes. Like the other members of the type IV collagen gene family, this gene is organized in a head-to-head conformation with another type IV collagen gene so that each gene pair shares a common promoter. Mutations in this gene are associated with type II autosomal recessive Alport syndrome (hereditary glomerulonephropathy) and with familial benign hematuria (thin basement membrane disease). Two transcripts, differing only in their transcription start sites, have been identified for this gene and, as is common for collagen genes, multiple polyadenylation sites are found in the 3' UTR.

== Disease Database ==
LOVD Alport gene variant databases (COL4A4, COL4A3, COL4A5)
