= Lenticonus =

Lenticonus (/len·ti·co·nus/ (len″tĭ-ko´nus)) [lens + L. conus, cone] is a rare congenital anomaly of the eye characterized by a conical protrusion on the crystalline lens capsule and the underlying cortex. It can reach a diameter of 2 to 7 mm. The conus may occur anteriorly or posteriorly. If the bulging is spherical, instead of conical, the condition is referred to as lentiglobus. It produces a decrease in visual acuity and irregular refraction that cannot be corrected by either spectacle or contact lenses.

Biomicroscopically lenticonus is characterized by a transparent, localized, sharply demarcated conical projection of the lens capsule and cortex, usually axial in localization. In an early stage, retro-illumination shows an oil droplet configuration. Using a narrow slit, the image of a conus is observed. In a more advanced stage associated subcapsular and cortical opacities appear. Retinoscopically the oil droplet produces a pathognomonic scissors movement of the light reflex. This phenomenon is due to the different refraction in the central and the peripheral area of the lens. Ultrasonography also can illustrate the existence of a lenticonus. A-scan ultrasonography may reveal an increased lens thickness and B- scanultrasonography may show herniated lenticular material, suggestive of a lenticonus. Amblyopia, cataract, strabismus and loss of central fixation may be observed in association with lenticonus posterior. Cataract, flecked retinopathy, posterior polymorphous dystrophy and corneal arcus juvenilis may be encountered in association with lenticonus anterior that occurs as a part of the Alport syndrome.

There exist two distinct types of lenticonus based on the face of the lens affected.

== Types ==
1. Lenticonus anterior; lenticonus anterior is part of the waardenburg syndrome
2. Lenticonus posterior; lenticonus posterior is more common than lenticonus anterior and is sometimes found in Lowe syndrome

Alport syndrome mostly causes anterior lenticonus. It can rarely cause posterior lenticonus, but this is uncommon.
