= List of A1 genes, proteins or receptors =

This is a list of genes, proteins or receptors named A1 or Alpha-1 :

- Actin, alpha 1
- Actinin, alpha 1
- Adaptor-related protein complex 2, alpha 1
- Aldehyde dehydrogenase 3 family, member A1
- Aldehyde dehydrogenase 4 family, member A1
- Aldehyde dehydrogenase 5 family, member A1
- Aldehyde dehydrogenase 6 family, member A1
- Aldehyde dehydrogenase 9 family, member A1
- Aldehyde dehydrogenase 18 family, member A1
- Aldo-keto reductase family 1, member A1
- Alpha-1-microglobulin/bikunin precursor
- Apolipoprotein A1 and ApoA-1 Milano
- ATPase, H+ transporting, lysosomal V0 subunit a1
- ATPase, Na+/K+ transporting, alpha 1
- ATP synthase, H+ transporting, mitochondrial F1 complex, alpha 1
- BCL2-related protein A1
- Butyrophilin, subfamily 1, member A1
- Butyrophilin, subfamily 3, member A1
- Capping protein (actin filament) muscle Z-line, alpha 1
- Carboxypeptidase A1
- Casein kinase 1, alpha 1
- Casein kinase 2, alpha 1
- Catenin (cadherin-associated protein), alpha 1
- Centaurin, alpha 1
- Cholinergic receptor, nicotinic, alpha 1
- Coagulation factor XIII, A1 polypeptide
- collagen, type I, alpha 1
- collagen, type II, alpha 1
- Collagen, type III, alpha 1
- Collagen, type IV, alpha 1
- Collagen, type V, alpha 1
- Collagen, type VI, alpha 1
- Collagen, type VII, alpha 1
- Collagen, type VIII, alpha 1
- Collagen, type IX, alpha 1
- Collagen, type X, alpha 1
- Collagen, type XI, alpha 1
- Collagen, type XII, alpha 1
- Collagen, type XIII, alpha 1
- Collagen, type XIV, alpha 1
- Collagen, type XV, alpha 1
- Collagen, type XVI, alpha 1
- Collagen, type XVII, alpha 1
- Collagen, type XVIII, alpha 1
- Collagen, type XIX, alpha 1
- Collagen, type XXV, alpha 1
- Collagen, type XXVII, alpha 1
- Crystallin, beta A1
- Cyclic nucleotide-gated channel alpha 1
- Cyclin A1
- Cytochrome P450, family 1, member A1
- Defensin, alpha 1
- Dystrophin-associated protein A1
- Ephrin A1
- Eukaryotic translation elongation factor 1 alpha 1
- Family with sequence similarity 13, member A1
- Family with sequence similarity 19 (chemokine (C-C motif)-like), member A1
- Gamma-aminobutyric acid (GABA) A receptor, alpha 1
- Gap junction protein, alpha 1
- GDNF family receptor alpha 1
- Glutathione S-transferase A1
- Glycine receptor, alpha 1
- Heat shock protein 90kDa alpha (cytosolic), member A1
- Hemoglobin, alpha 1
- Heterogeneous nuclear ribonucleoprotein A1
- Homeobox A1
- Immunoglobulin heavy constant alpha 1
- Importin alpha 1
- Interferon, alpha 1
- Interleukin 13 receptor, alpha 1
- Karyopherin alpha 1
- Laminin, alpha 1
- Major histocompatibility complex, class II, DP alpha 1
- Major histocompatibility complex, class II, DQ alpha 1
- Myosin light chain A1, an actin-binding protein
- NADH dehydrogenase (ubiquinone), alpha 1
- Nucleolar protein, member A1
- PCDHA4
- Phospholipase A1
- Phosphorylase kinase, alpha 1
- Plexin A1
- Polymerase (DNA directed), alpha 1
- Potassium large conductance calcium-activated channel, subfamily M, alpha 1
- Proteasome (prosome, macropain) subunit, alpha 1
- Protein kinase, AMP-activated, alpha 1
- Protein tyrosine phosphatase, receptor type, f polypeptide (PTPRF), interacting protein (liprin), alpha 1
- Protocadherin alpha 1
- Pulmonary surfactant-associated protein A1
- Pyruvate dehydrogenase (lipoamide) alpha 1
- RNA binding motif protein, Y-linked, family 1, member A1
- Replication protein A1
- S100 calcium binding protein A1
- Sec61 alpha 1
- Serum amyloid A1
- Solute carrier family 35 (CMP-sialic acid transporter), member A1
- Spectrin, alpha 1
- Sperm protein associated with the nucleus, X-linked, family member A1
- Syntrophin, alpha 1
- Transient receptor potential cation channel, member A1
- UDP glucuronosyltransferase 1 family, polypeptide A1
- Urea Transporter A1
- a gene found in the maize encoding for the dihydroflavonol 4-reductase (reducing dihydroflavonols into flavan-4-ols) in the phlobaphene metabolic pathway

proteins

- α-1-antitrypsin, an acute-phase protein in the Alpha 1-antitrypsin deficiency, a genetic disorder
- Annexin A1, a human protein
- Outer membrane phospholipase A1, a bacterial protein

receptors

- α-1-Adrenoceptor, an adrenergic receptor with the primary effect of vasoconstriction
  - Alpha-1 blocker, a variety of drugs which block α1-adrenergic receptors in arteries and smooth muscles
- Adenosine A1 receptor
- EPH receptor A1
- A1, a subfamily of rhodopsin-like receptors
- SR-A1, a type of scavenger receptors

domains

- CTA1, a portion of the cholera toxin chain

alleles

- A1, an allele in the DRD2 TaqI polymorphism that could be involved in alcoholism
