= Sarcospan =

SSPN

Identifiers
- Aliases: SSPN, DAGA5, KRAG, NSPN, SPN1, SPN2, sarcospan
- External IDs: OMIM: 601599; MGI: 1353511; GeneCards: SSPN

Gene location (Human)
Chr.	Chromosome 12 (human)
Band	12p12.1	Start	26,121,991 bp
Band	12p12.1	End	26,299,290 bp

Gene location (Mouse)
Chr.	Chromosome 6 (mouse)
Band	6 G3|6 77.7 cM	Start	145,877,367 bp
Band	6 G3|6 77.7 cM	End	145,910,949 bp
RNA expression pattern
Bgee	Human / Mouse (ortholog); Top expressed in: synovial joint; Skeletal muscle tissue of rectus abdominis; body of tongue; urethra; saphenous vein; trigeminal ganglion; Achilles tendon; vena cava; spinal ganglia; tibia / Top expressed in: myocardium of ventricle; cardiac muscles; cardiac muscle tissue of left ventricle; thoracic diaphragm; digastric muscle; interventricular septum; triceps brachii muscle; vastus lateralis muscle; ankle; sternocleidomastoid muscle; More reference expression data
BioGPS	n/a
Orthologs
Databases	NCBI: entry; OMA: entry
Species	Human	Mouse
Entrez	8082	16651
Ensembl	ENSG00000123096	ENSMUSG00000030255
UniProt	Q14714	Q62147
RefSeq (mRNA)	NM_001135823; NM_005086	NM_010656; NM_001310837
RefSeq (protein)	NP_001129295; NP_005077	NP_001297766; NP_034786
Location (UCSC)	Chr 12: 26.12 – 26.3 Mb	Chr 6: 145.88 – 145.91 Mb
PubMed search
- Wikidata
View/Edit Human	View/Edit Mouse

Sarcospan is a protein that in humans is encoded by the SSPN gene.

Originally identified as Kirsten ras associated gene (KRAG), sarcospan is a 25-kDa transmembrane protein located in the dystrophin-associated protein complex of skeletal muscle cells, where it is most abundant. It contains four transmembrane spanning helices with both N- and C-terminal domains located intracellularly. Loss of SSPN expression occurs in patients with Duchenne muscular dystrophy. Dystrophin is required for proper localization of SSPN. SSPN is also an essential regulator of Akt signaling pathways. Without SSPN, Akt signaling pathways will be hindered and muscle regeneration will not occur.

== Function ==
Sarcospan is a protein that plays a crucial role in muscle health and function. It is part of the dystrophin-associated glycoprotein complex (DGC), which is a protein complex found in muscle cells that helps to maintain the structural integrity of muscle fibers. Sarcospan interacts with other proteins in the DGC, and mutations in the gene that encodes sarcospan can lead to muscular dystrophy, a group of genetic disorders characterized by progressive muscle weakness and degeneration.

Sarcospan has multiple functions within the DGC that contribute to its role in muscle health. The DGC is a complex of proteins that spans the cell membrane of muscle cells and links the extracellular matrix to the intracellular cytoskeleton, providing stability and integrity to the muscle fiber. Sarcospan is one of the components of the DGC and interacts with other proteins in the complex, including dystrophin, syntrophins, and dystroglycans.

One of the key functions of sarcospan is to help stabilize the DGC and promote its proper localization at the muscle cell membrane. Sarcospan interacts with dystroglycans, which are transmembrane proteins that connect the DGC to the extracellular matrix. This interaction helps to anchor the DGC to the muscle cell membrane and contributes to the overall stability of the muscle fiber. Additionally, sarcospan interacts with syntrophins, which are adapter proteins that link the DGC to the actin cytoskeleton inside the muscle cell. This interaction helps to maintain the structural integrity of the muscle fiber and is important for muscle contraction and force generation.

=== Cell signaling ===
Sarcospan also plays a role in signaling pathways that are involved in muscle growth and regeneration. Studies have shown that sarcospan can regulate the activity of certain signaling molecules, such as focal adhesion kinase (FAK), which is involved in cell adhesion and migration. Sarcospan has been implicated in the regulation of muscle stem cells, known as satellite cells, which are responsible for muscle regeneration after injury or damage. Sarcospan has been shown to modulate satellite cell activation and migration, suggesting that it may have a role in muscle repair and regeneration processes.

Sarcospan is primarily localized to the muscle cell membrane, specifically at the neuromuscular junction (NMJ) and the sarcolemma, which is the plasma membrane of muscle cells. The NMJ is the specialized synapse between the motor neuron and the muscle fiber, where nerve impulses are transmitted to the muscle to initiate contraction. The DGC, including sarcospan, is enriched at the NMJ, where it plays a critical role in maintaining the integrity of the muscle membrane and ensuring proper neuromuscular signaling.

In addition to the NMJ, sarcospan is also localized along the sarcolemma, which is the continuous plasma membrane that surrounds the entire muscle fiber. Sarcospan is distributed in a striated pattern along the sarcolemma, suggesting that it may have specific roles in different regions of the muscle fiber. The precise localization of sarcospan to the NMJ and the sarcolemma is important for its function in stabilizing the DGC and promoting muscle integrity.

== Mutations and diseases ==
Mutations in the gene that encodes sarcospan have been implicated in the development of muscular dystrophy, which is a group of genetic disorders characterized by progressive muscle weakness and degeneration. Muscular dystrophy is caused by mutations in various genes that are involved in the structure and function of muscle, including dystrophin, which is a key component of the DGC that interacts with sarcospan. The loss of dystrophin results in muscular dystrophy. SSPN upregulates the levels of Utrophin-glycoprotein complex (UGC) to make up for the loss of dystrophin in the neuromuscular junction. Sarcoglycans bind to SSPN and form the SG-SSPN complex, which interacts with dystroglycans (DG) and Utrophin leading to the formation of the UGC. SSPN regulates the amount of Utrophin produced by the UGC to restore laminin binding due to the absence of dystrophin. If laminin binding is not restored by SSPN, contraction of the membrane is present. In dystrophic mdx mice, SSPN increases levels of Utrophin and restores the levels of laminin binding, reducing the symptoms of muscular dystrophy

Mutations in the gene that encodes sarcospan have been implicated in the development of muscular dystrophy, which is a group of genetic disorders characterized by progressive muscle weakness and degeneration. Muscular dystrophy is caused by mutations in various genes that are involved in the structure and function of muscle, including dystrophin, which is a key component of the DGC that interacts with sarcospan.

== Research applications ==
The study of sarcospan has important research applications that may contribute to the development of therapeutic interventions for muscular dystrophy and other muscle-related disorders.

=== Therapeutic strategies ===
The elucidation of the role of sarcospan in muscular dystrophy has led to the exploration of potential therapeutic strategies that target sarcospan or the DGC. For example, approaches aimed at restoring sarcospan expression or function have been investigated as potential therapeutic interventions for muscular dystrophy. Gene therapy techniques, such as viral-mediated gene delivery, have been explored to restore sarcospan expression in muscle cells, with promising results in preclinical studies. Additionally, gene editing technologies, such as CRISPR-Cas9, have been used to correct sarcospan mutations in muscle cells, offering potential gene-based therapeutic approaches for muscular dystrophy.

=== Drug development ===
Sarcospan has been considered as a potential target for drug development in the treatment of muscular dystrophy. Small molecule compounds that can modulate sarcospan function or stabilize the DGC have been explored as potential therapeutic agents. For example, studies have shown that targeting specific signaling pathways, such as the FAK pathway, which is regulated by sarcospan, can improve muscle function in animal models of muscular dystrophy. Additionally, compounds that can enhance the stability or localization of the DGC, including sarcospan, have been investigated for their potential to ameliorate muscle membrane fragility and reduce muscle damage in muscular dystrophy.

=== Biomarker development ===
Sarcospan has been proposed as a potential biomarker for muscular dystrophy and other muscle-related disorders. Biomarkers are measurable indicators that can provide information about disease status, progression, and response to treatment. Sarcospan levels in blood or other biological samples may reflect the integrity of the DGC and muscle membrane, and changes in sarcospan levels may be indicative of disease progression or response to therapeutic interventions. Development of sarcospan as a biomarker may aid in diagnosis, prognosis, and monitoring of muscular dystrophy and other muscle-related disorders.

=== Mechanistic studies ===
Research on sarcospan has provided insights into the molecular mechanisms underlying muscle development, regeneration, and disease. Studies using animal models or cell culture systems have helped to elucidate the role of sarcospan in the stability and function of the DGC, its involvement in signaling pathways, and its contribution
