= Dystrobrevin alpha =

Protein found in humans

DTNA

Identifiers
- Aliases: DTNA, D18S892E, DRP3, DTN, DTN-A, LVNC1, dystrobrevin alpha
- External IDs: OMIM: 601239; MGI: 106039; GeneCards: DTNA
Available structures
PDB	Ortholog search: PDBe RCSB
PDB	List of PDB id codes 2E5R

Gene location (Human)
Chr.	Chromosome 18 (human)
Band	18q12.1	Start	34,493,290 bp
Band	18q12.1	End	34,891,844 bp

Gene location (Mouse)
Chr.	Chromosome 18 (mouse)
Band	18 A2|18 12.08 cM	Start	23,415,135 bp
Band	18 A2|18 12.08 cM	End	23,659,715 bp
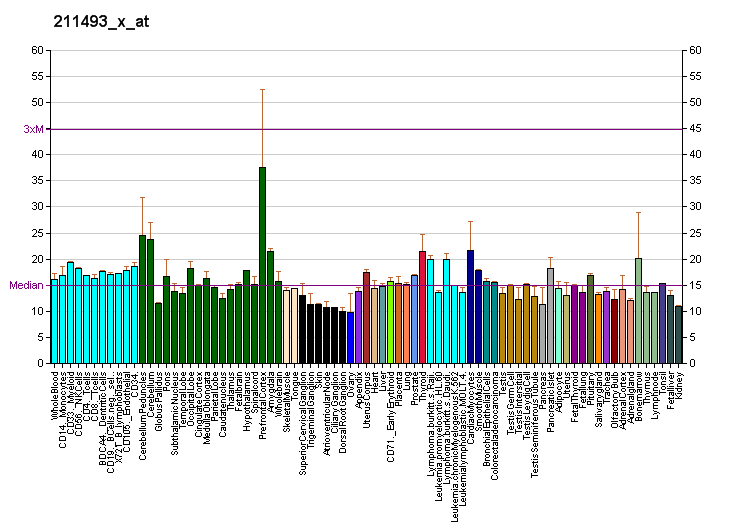

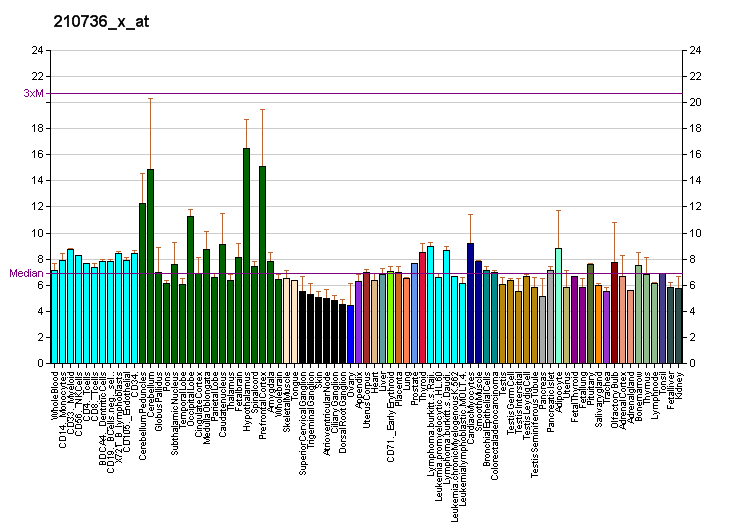

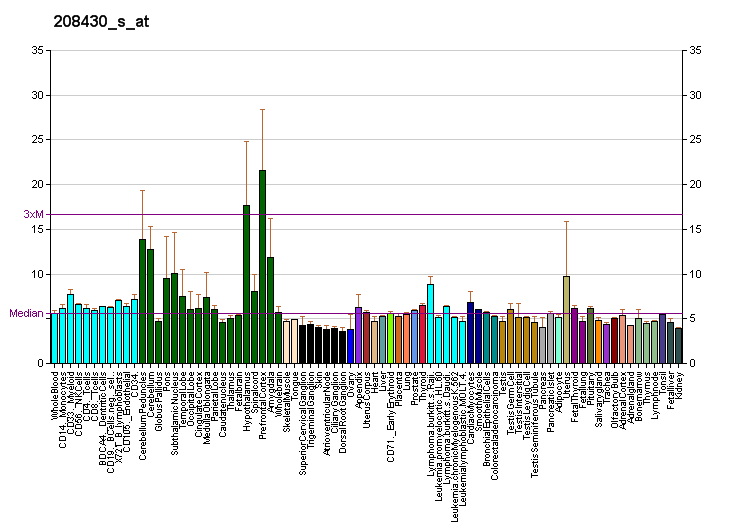
RNA expression pattern
Bgee	Human / Mouse (ortholog); Top expressed in: internal globus pallidus; C1 segment; external globus pallidus; nucleus accumbens; amygdala; superior vestibular nucleus; caudate nucleus; right frontal lobe; corpus callosum; putamen / Top expressed in: saccule; cerebellar vermis; Rostral migratory stream; lobe of cerebellum; mammillary body; median eminence; arcuate nucleus; dorsal tegmental nucleus; lateral geniculate nucleus; olfactory tubercle; More reference expression data
BioGPS	More reference expression data
Gene ontology
Molecular function	zinc ion binding; protein binding; metal ion binding; PDZ domain binding
Cellular component	cytoplasm; extrinsic component of cytoplasmic side of plasma membrane; cell junction; axon; sarcolemma; plasma membrane; cell projection; synapse; membrane; protein-containing complex
Biological process	neuromuscular synaptic transmission; striated muscle contraction; signal transduction; chemical synaptic transmission
Sources:Amigo / QuickGO
Orthologs
Databases	NCBI: entry; OMA: entry
Species	Human	Mouse
Entrez	1837	13527
Ensembl	ENSG00000134769	ENSMUSG00000024302
UniProt	Q9Y4J8	Q9D2N4
RefSeq (mRNA)	NM_001128175; NM_001198938; NM_001198939; NM_001198940; NM_001198941 NM_001198942; NM_001198943; NM_001198944; NM_001198945; NM_001390; NM_001391; NM_001392; NM_032975; NM_032978; NM_032979; NM_032980; NM_032981	NM_001285807; NM_001285808; NM_001285810; NM_001285811; NM_001285813 NM_001285817; NM_010087; NM_207650; NM_001361215; NM_001361216; NM_001361217
RefSeq (protein)	NP_001121647; NP_001185867; NP_001185868; NP_001185869; NP_001185870 NP_001185871; NP_001185872; NP_001185873; NP_001185874; NP_001381; NP_001382; NP_001383; NP_116757; NP_116760; NP_116761; NP_116762; NP_116763	NP_001272736; NP_001272737; NP_001272739; NP_001272740; NP_001272742 NP_001272746; NP_034217; NP_997533; NP_001348144; NP_001348145; NP_001348146
Location (UCSC)	Chr 18: 34.49 – 34.89 Mb	Chr 18: 23.42 – 23.66 Mb
PubMed search
- Wikidata
View/Edit Human	View/Edit Mouse

Dystrobrevin alpha is a protein that in humans is encoded by the DTNA gene.

== Function ==
The protein encoded by this gene belongs to the dystrobrevin subfamily and the dystrophin family. This protein is a component of the dystrophin-associated protein complex (DPC). The DPC consists of dystrophin and several integral and peripheral membrane proteins, including dystroglycans, sarcoglycans, syntrophins and alpha- and beta-dystrobrevin. The DPC localizes to the sarcolemma and its disruption is associated with various forms of muscular dystrophy. This protein may be involved in the formation and stability of synapses as well as the clustering of nicotinic acetylcholine receptors. Multiple alternatively spliced transcript variants encoding different isoforms have been identified.

== Clinical significance ==
Mutations in DTNA are associated with Ménière's disease.

== Interactions ==
Dystrobrevin has been shown to interact with dystrophin.
