= Dystrobrevin =

Protein

dystrobrevin, alpha

Identifiers
- Symbol: DTNA
- NCBI gene: 1837
- HGNC: 3057
- OMIM: 601239
- RefSeq: NM_032981
- UniProt: Q9Y4J8

Other data
- Locus: Chr. 18 q12
Search for
- Structures: Swiss-model
- Domains: InterPro

dystrobrevin, beta

Identifiers
- Symbol: DTNB
- NCBI gene: 1838
- HGNC: 3058
- OMIM: 602415
- RefSeq: NM_033147
- UniProt: O60941

Other data
- Locus: Chr. 2 p24
Search for
- Structures: Swiss-model
- Domains: InterPro

Dystrobrevin is a protein that binds to dystrophin in the costamere of skeletal muscle cells. In humans, there are at least two isoforms of dystrobrevin, dystrobrevin alpha and dystrobrevin beta.

Dystrobrevins are members of dystrophin-related protein family which are thought to play an important role in intracellular signal transduction and provide a membrane scaffold in muscle. Defects in dystrobrevins and their associated proteins cause a range of neuromuscular diseases such as muscular dystrophies. Dystrobrevin was first identified by isolating from the electric organ of the electric ray Torpedo californica. It is a phosphoprotein, which weights 87 kDa, associated with the postsynaptic membrane at the cytoplasmic face. Dystrobrevin proteins have been said to participates in the formation and stability of synapses because it copurifies with acetylcholine receptors from Torpedo electric organ membranes.

In 1997, an experiment was done using the yeast two-hybrid model to identify protein-protein interaction between dystrobrevin and dystrophin-associated protein complex (DPC). The evidence suggested that dystrobrevin works as a motor protein receptor that might play an important role in the transport of components of the dystrophin-associated protein complex to specific intracellular sites. The DPC is expressed in both muscle and non-muscle tissues. It works as a mechanical component of cells and a dynamic multifunctional structure that can serve as a scaffold for signaling molecules. The dystrophin-associated proteins can be divided into three groups depending on their cellular localization: extracellular, transmembrane, and cytoplasmic. Dystrobrevin protein is a part of the cytoplasmic complex and an intracellular protein that binds directly to dystrophin.

In invertebrates, dystrobrevin is present as a single protein, while in vertebrates, there are two isoforms, a-dystrobrevin (DTNA) and β-dystrobrevin (DTNB). Each dystrobrevin isoform has a unique structure with carboxyl termini and sequence homology with the cysteine-rich carboxyl-terminal region of dystrophin. This region of similarity can be divided into several functional domains such as two coiled-coil regions, two EF hands or a ZZ-type zinc finger.

== Evolutionary History ==
A phylogenic tree for the dystrophin protein family has been proposed based on the analysis of known dystrobrevin and dystrophin sequences that were extracted from human and fruit fly proteins. The phylogeny postulated a non-metazoan ancestor that had a single dystrophin/dystrobrevin protein, which probably functioned as a homodimer. At some point before the last common ancestor of metazoans, a duplication lead to a separation of dystrophin and dystrobrevin genes, their protein products forming a heterodimer of more specialized components. In vertebrates, two other duplications occurred. The first gave rise to DRP2, a common ancestor of dystrophin and utrophin, and to α- and β-dystrobrevin. The second resulted in the separate dystrophin and utrophin genes. In addition, sequence alignments of dystrophin family protein strongly support the concept that two distinct subfamilies exist, one consisted of dystrophin, utrophin, and DRP2 and the other consisted of α- and β-dystrobrevin.

== Classification ==
Dystrobrevins are the product of two distinct genes coding for two highly homologous proteins, dystrobrevin α, and dystrobrevin β. Several different transcripts are derived from each gene by alternative splicing or initiation sites, generating a large family of dystrobrevin isoforms.

=== Dystrobrevin alpha ===
The α-dystrobrevin structure is homologous to the cysteine-rich carboxy-terminal domain of dystrophin. This protein is expressed predominantly in skeletal muscle, heart, lung, and central nervous system. It is thought to be involved in synaptic transmission at the neuromuscular junction and in intracellular signaling.

=== Dystrobrevin beta ===
The β-dystrobrevin, is only found in non-muscle tissues, predominantly expressed in kidney and brain, and forms complexes with dystrophin-associated proteins and syntrophin in liver and brain. In the brain, β-dystrobrevin associates with dystrophin isoforms in the cortex, hippocampus, and Purkinje neurons.

== Gene and transcripts ==
The human α-dystrobrevin gene is localized to chromosome 18 and consists of 23 coding exons. α-Dystrobrevin is known to be subject to extensive splicing regulation. The alternative usage of three exons 21, 17B, and 11B generates RNA molecules with different lengths encoding three major α-dystrobrevin products in human skeletal muscle: α-dystrobrevin 1, α-dystrobrevin 2, and α-dystrobrevin 3. Due to alternative splicing within the coding regions, supplemental diversity is observed referred to as variable regions 1, 2, and 3 Firstly, variable region 1 (vr1) consists of a short exon containing three amino acids. In mice, the transcripts including this exon are primarily restricted to the brain but are present in the brain, heart, and skeletal muscle in humans. Secondly, variable region 2 (vr2) consists of exons 17A and 17B which encodes the unique C-terminal tail of α-dystrobrevin 2. Lastly, variable region 3 (vr3) consists of exons 11A, 11B, and 12, and exon 11B encodes the unique C-terminal tail of α-dystrobrevin 3. In mouse skeletal muscle, the splicing of vr2 and vr3 has been reported to be developmentally controlled.

The human β-dystrobrevin gene was localized to the short arm of chromosome 2. Pair-wise comparison between α- and β-dystrobrevin sequences revealed that the two dystrobrevins have 76% identity.

== Structure of protein ==
α- and β-Dystrobrevin proteins structure consisted of four major domains, a ZZ -type zinc finger domain, two EF-hand regions, an α-helical coiled-coil domain containing a dystrophin binding site, and a tyrosine kinase substrate domain. α-Dystrobrevin 1, α-Dystrobrevin 2, and α-dystrobrevin 3 binds to the dystrophin-glycoprotein complex via the amino-terminus region. α-Dystrobrevin 1 and α-Dystrobrevin 2 bind dystrophin through a highly conserved coiled-coil domain.

β-dystrobrevin is detected as a 61-kDa protein in the brain, kidney, liver, and lung. β-dystrobrevin can be distinguished from α-dystrobrevin 2 because it has lower relative mobility. Slight differences in the size of the β-dystrobrevin were observed in the brain compared with the kidney, liver, and lung.

== Localization ==
α-Dystrobrevin 1 is localized in the sarcolemma and is abundant at the neuromuscular junction, and concentrated in the crest of the junctional folds. α-Dystrobrevin 2 is localized around the entire circumference of the sarcolemmal plasma membrane including the neuromuscular junction. α-Dystrobrevin 2 primarily co-localizes with dystrophin at the neuromuscular junction, while α-Dystrobrevin 1 co-localizes with both dystrophin and utrophin. α-Dystrobrevin 3 has been thought to be located on the cytoplasmic site.

The location and expression pattern of β-dystrobrevin was observed by using Northern blots of mouse RNAs. A single 2.5-kb transcript was detected predominantly in the brain and kidney and to a lesser extent in liver and lung. No β-dystrobrevin transcripts were detected in skeletal and cardiac muscle even after long exposures. This evidence suggested that the β-dystrobrevin transcript was weakly expressed or absent in muscle.

== Function ==
The fundamental role of the dystrobrevin protein family remains unclear. Much of what we do know has been observation from biochemical studies of associated proteins and the phenotypic consequences of their loss.

α-Dystrobrevin proteins are suggested to involve in the structural integrity of muscle cells by interacting with cytoskeletal binding proteins and signal transduction by interacting with syntrophin. Firstly, α-Dystrobrevin is a component of the dystrophin-glycoprotein complex, which is extremely useful for maintenance of the skeletal cell integrity. α-dystrobrevin associated with dystrophin at its coil-coil region and with a sarcoglycan-protein complex at the amino-terminal. It has been proposed to function as a structural scaffold linking the dystrophin-glycoprotein complex to the intracellular cytoskeleton. Based on the yeast two-hybrid system and co-immunoprecipitation analysis, three other proteins were identified as additional to α-dystrobrevin-binding proteins: β-synemin, syncoilin, and dysbindin. Syncoilin and β-synemin are both intermediate filament proteins. The intermediate filaments are responsible for forming the structure of the cell cytoskeleton and providing mechanical stability to the cells. Syncoilin co-localizes with α-dystrobrevin at both the neuromuscular junction and sarcolemma while β-Synemin co-localizes with α-dystrobrevin only at the neuromuscular junction. The interaction of α-dystrobrevin and β-synemin provides an additional connection between the intermediate filament system and the dytsrophin-glycoprotein complex. Dysbindin is located at the sarcolemma, and its expression in skeletal muscle is relatively low. Secondly, α-Dystrobrevins participate in intracellular signaling since they bind directly with syntrophin, which is a modular adaptor protein thought to be involved in signal transduction. In skeletal muscle, syntrophins have four main isoforms: α-, β1-, β2-, and γ2-syntrophin.

β-dystrobrevin has been thought to play a structural role in the composition of the dystrophin-associated protein complex in the brain which differs from that in muscle. β-dystrobrevin coimmunoprecipitates with the dystrophin isoforms Dp71 and Dp140 in the brain. Dp140 is concentrated in the brain microvasculature while the Dp71 transcript is found throughout the brain but is particularly abundant in the dentate gyrus of the temporal lobe, and the olfactory bulb.

== Dystrobrevins and muscle diseases ==
The consequences of null mutation are known for humans and rodents in the case of dystrophin, utrophin, and α-dystrobrevin, and for nematode in the case of dystrophin and dystrobrevin. In human, the Duchenne muscular dystrophy is a well-known muscle disease which highlights the importance of dystrophin/ dystrobrevin protein to function of muscle tissue. Duchenne muscular dystrophy (DMD) is a fatal progressive disease of both cardiac and skeletal muscle resulting from the mutations in the DMD gene and loss of the protein dystrophin. The lack of dystrophin that causes Duchenne muscular dystrophy results in secondary loss of other dystrophin-complex components from the membrane. The loss of protein dystrophin ultimately leads to a lethal syndrome of skeletal and cardiac myopathy, stationary night blindness, mental retardation, a cardiac-conduction defect, and a subtle smooth-muscle defect. Some of these traits are also found in a subset of the limb-girdle muscular dystrophies that result from sarcoglycan defects. α-Dystrobrevin proteins were found absent in a heart that is highly susceptible to injury during cardiac stress. The dystrobrevin loss resulted from a weakening of dystrophin's interaction with the membrane-bound dystrophin-glycoprotein complex, and lead to a significant loss of membrane integrity.
