= Ezutromid =

Chemical compound

Legal status
- Legal status: Investigational

Identifiers
- IUPAC name: 5-Ethylsulfonyl-2-naphthalen-2-yl-1,3-benzoxazole
- CAS Number: 945531-77-1
- PubChem CID: 25109292
- ChemSpider: 26344547
- UNII: 645R07LF0D
- CompTox Dashboard (EPA): DTXSID30241525

Chemical and physical data
- Formula: C_{19}H_{15}NO_{3}S
- Molar mass: 337.39 g·mol^{−1}
- 3D model (JSmol): Interactive image
- SMILES: CCS(=O)(=O)c1ccc2c(c1)nc(o2)c3ccc4ccccc4c3
- InChI: InChI=1S/C19H15NO3S/c1-2-24(21,22)16-9-10-18-17(12-16)20-19(23-18)15-8-7-13-5-3-4-6-14(13)11-15/h3-12H,2H2,1H3; Key:KSGCNXAZROJSNW-UHFFFAOYSA-N

Ezutromid is an orally administered small molecule utrophin modulator involved in a Phase 2 clinical trial produced by Summit Therapeutics for the treatment of Duchenne muscular dystrophy (DMD). DMD is a fatal x-linked recessive disease affecting approximately 1 in 5000 males and is a designated orphan disease by the FDA and European Medicines Agency. Approximately 1/3 of the children obtain DMD as a result of spontaneous mutation in the dystrophin gene and have no family history of the disease. Dystrophin is a vital component of mature muscle function, and therefore DMD patients have multifarious forms of defunct or deficient dystrophin proteins that all manifest symptomatically as muscle necrosis and eventually organ failure. Ezutromid is theorized to maintain utrophin, a protein functionally and structurally similar to dystrophin that precedes and is replaced by dystrophin during development. Utrophin and dystrophin are reciprocally expressed, and are found in different locations in a mature muscle cell. However, in dystrophin-deficient patients, utrophin was found to be upregulated and is theorized to replace dystrophin in order to maintain muscle fibers. Ezutromid is projected to have the potential to treat all patients suffering with DMD as it maintains the production of utrophin to counteract the lack of dystrophin to retard muscle degeneration. Both the FDA and European Medicines Agency has given ezutromid an orphan drug designation. The FDA Office of Orphan Products and Development offers an Orphan Drug Designation program (ODD) that allows drugs aimed to treat diseases that affect less than 200,000 people in the U.S. monetary incentives such as a period of market exclusivity, tax incentives, and expedited approval processes.

The Phase 2 clinical trial was ended in 2018 and the medication discontinued after it failed to show any benefit in slowing the disease.

== Clinical trials ==
The first Phase 1b trial (NCT02056808) began in November 2013 and involved 12 patients aged 5–11 years old. The patients were divided into three groups given escalating oral doses testing the safety and tolerability after each increase over the course of 10 days.

Another completed Phase 1b trial (NCT02383511) began February 2015 and involved 12 patients aged 5–13 years old. The goal was to determine the safety, tolerability, and pharmacokinetic parameters by measuring plasma concentration and major metabolite levels over 28 days for three sequence groups. Each sequence involved placebo, 1250 mg, and 2500 mg BID (twice a day) doses given for one week each.

A PhaseOut DMD, Phase 2, Proof of Concept (NCT02858362) clinical trial is underway that tests the clinical safety and efficacy of an oral suspension of ezutromid. The 48-week open-label trial is enrolling 40 boys, ages 5–10, living in the U.K. or U.S. MRI leg muscle change will be measured as well as ezutromid plasma concentration levels, with a secondary goal of obtaining quantifiable images of utrophin membrane stained biopsies at baseline and either 24 or 48 weeks.

== Commercial aspects ==
As of 2016, ataluren was the only approved drug in the EU to treat a specific subpopulation of patients with nmDMD, or DMD caused by a nonsense mutation. However, nonsense mutations only account for approximately 15% of all patients with DMD. Therefore, Summit Therapeutics projects to file for regulatory approval in the US and EU by 2019 and to reach market in 2020. They expect to profit just over £24,046 in 2020 and £942,656 in 2025, which amounts to ~10% CGR for the first 7 years on the basis of treating all DMD patients in the US, EU, Iceland, Norway, Switzerland and Russia.

Furthermore, Summit Therapeutics has entered an agreement with Sarepta Therapeutics as of October 2016 regarding the commercialization of ezutromid. The agreement consists of a collaboration between Sarepta and Summit to share the research and developing costs for the development of novel therapies to treat DMD patients.
