= Dystrobrevin beta =

Protein-coding gene in the species Homo sapiens

DTNB

Identifiers
- Aliases: DTNB, dystrobrevin beta
- External IDs: OMIM: 602415; MGI: 1203728; GeneCards: DTNB

Gene location (Human)
Chr.	Chromosome 2 (human)
Band	2p23.3	Start	25,377,198 bp
Band	2p23.3	End	25,673,647 bp

Gene location (Mouse)
Chr.	Chromosome 12 (mouse)
Band	12 A1.1|12 1.88 cM	Start	3,622,381 bp
Band	12 A1.1|12 1.88 cM	End	3,831,796 bp
RNA expression pattern
Bgee	Human / Mouse (ortholog); Top expressed in: C1 segment; right frontal lobe; prefrontal cortex; cingulate gyrus; anterior cingulate cortex; Brodmann area 9; amygdala; Brodmann area 10; nucleus accumbens; salivary gland / Top expressed in: superior frontal gyrus; Rostral migratory stream; dentate gyrus of hippocampal formation granule cell; neural layer of retina; right kidney; genital tubercle; primary visual cortex; lacrimal gland; granulocyte; seminiferous tubule; More reference expression data
BioGPS	n/a
Orthologs
Databases	NCBI: entry; OMA: entry
Species	Human	Mouse
Entrez	1838	13528
Ensembl	ENSG00000138101	ENSMUSG00000071454
UniProt	O60941	O70585
RefSeq (mRNA)	NM_001256303; NM_001256304; NM_001256308; NM_021907; NM_033147 NM_033148; NM_183360; NM_183361; NM_001320932; NM_001320933; NM_001320934; NM_001320935; NM_001320936; NM_001320937; NM_001351381; NM_001351382; NM_001351383; NM_001351384; NM_001351385; NM_001351386; NM_001351387; NM_001351388; NM_001351389; NM_001351390; NM_001351391; NM_001351392; NM_001351393; NM_001351394; NM_001351395; NM_001394686	NM_001162465; NM_007886; NM_001355528; NM_001374710
RefSeq (protein)	NP_001243232; NP_001243233; NP_001243237; NP_001307861; NP_001307862 NP_001307863; NP_001307864; NP_001307865; NP_001307866; NP_068707; NP_149159; NP_149160; NP_899204; NP_899205; NP_001338310; NP_001338311; NP_001338312; NP_001338313; NP_001338314; NP_001338315; NP_001338316; NP_001338317; NP_001338318; NP_001338319; NP_001338320; NP_001338321; NP_001338322; NP_001338323; NP_001338324	NP_001155937; NP_031912; NP_001342457; NP_001361639
Location (UCSC)	Chr 2: 25.38 – 25.67 Mb	Chr 12: 3.62 – 3.83 Mb
PubMed search
- Wikidata
View/Edit Human	View/Edit Mouse

Dystrobrevin beta is a protein which in humans is encoded by the DTNB gene.

== Function ==
This gene encodes dystrobrevin beta, a component of the dystrophin-associated protein complex (DPC). The DPC consists of dystrophin and several integral and peripheral membrane proteins, including dystroglycans, sarcoglycans, syntrophins and dystrobrevin alpha and beta. The DPC localizes to the sarcolemma and its disruption is associated with various forms of muscular dystrophy. Dystrobrevin beta is thought to interact with syntrophin and the DP71 short form of dystrophin. Alternatively spliced transcript variants encoding different isoforms have been identified.
