= Syntrophin =

The syntrophins are a family of five 60-kiloDalton proteins that are associated with dystrophin, the protein associated with Duchenne muscular dystrophy and Becker muscular dystrophy. The name comes from the Greek word syntrophos, meaning "companion." The five syntrophins are encoded by separate genes and are termed α, β_{1}, β_{2}, γ_{1}, and γ_{2}. Syntrophin was first identified as a dystrophin-associated protein present in the Torpedo electric organ (originally called "58K protein"). Subsequently, α-syntrophin was shown to be the predominant isoform in skeletal muscle where it is localized on the sarcolemma and enriched at the neuromuscular junction. The β-syntrophins and γ_{2}-syntrophin are also present in skeletal muscle but also are in most other tissues. The expression of γ_{1}-syntrophin is mostly confined to brain. The syntrophins are adaptor proteins that use their multiple protein interaction domains (two pleckstrin homology domains and a PDZ domain) to localize a variety of signaling proteins (kinases, ion channels, water channels, nitric oxide synthase) to specific intracellular locations. α-Syntrophin binds to nNOS in the dystrophin-associated glycoprotein complex in skeletal muscle cells. There it produces NO upon muscle contraction leading to dilation of the arteries in the local area.
