= Mdx mouse =

Popular model for studying Duchenne muscular dystrophy

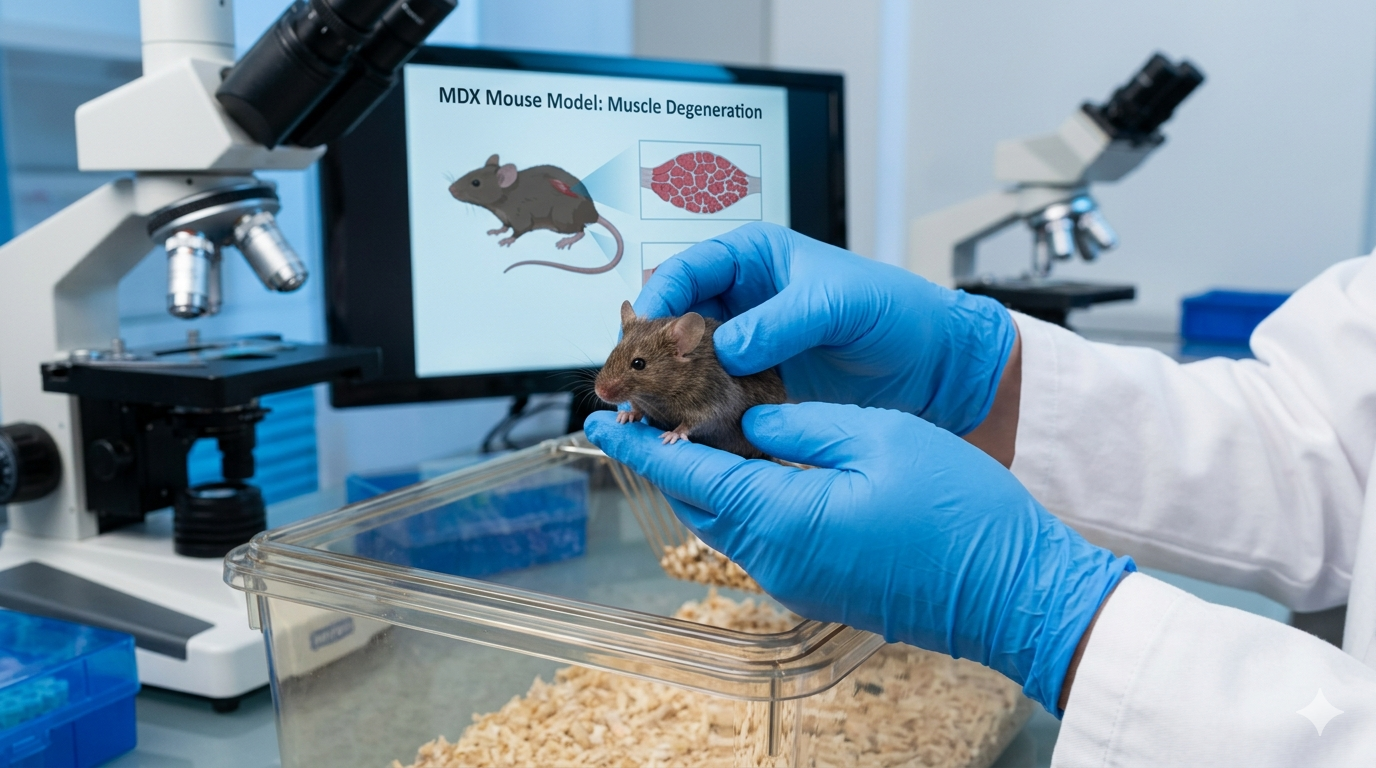
MDX laboratory mouse Animal model used to study Duchenne Muscular Dystrophy (DMD)

The mdx mouse is a popular model for studying Duchenne muscular dystrophy (DMD). The mdx mouse has a point mutation in its DMD gene, changing the amino acid coding for a glutamine to STOP codon. This causes the muscle cells to produce a small, nonfunctional dystrophin protein. As a result, the mouse has a mild form of DMD where there is increased muscle damage and weakness.

== History ==
The mdx mouse was first described in 1984 by Bulfield et al. in a colony of C57BL/10ScSn mice, showing elevated muscle creatine kinase (CK) and histological lesions characteristic of muscular dystrophy.

In 1989, Sicinski et al. identified the precise mutation: a C-to-T transition (nonsense point mutation) in exon 23 of the Dmd gene, creating a premature stop codon and abolishing full-length dystrophin expression. This makes mdx mice a key model for Duchenne muscular dystrophy.

== Limitations ==
Despite its widespread use, the mdx mouse has several important limitations as a model for Duchenne muscular dystrophy. The mdx mouse displays a considerably milder phenotype than human DMD patients, largely due to the compensatory upregulation of utrophin.

In 2016, despite decades of successful preclinical studies in mdx mice, many promising therapies failed in human clinical trials, highlighting the translational gap between the mouse model and human disease.

To overcome these limitations, researchers have developed improved models such as the mdx/utrophin double knockout mouse, which more closely resembles the severe human DMD phenotype, and humanized mdx models that allow testing of human-specific therapies such as exon skipping drugs.

== mdx Mouse and CRISPR-Cas9 ==
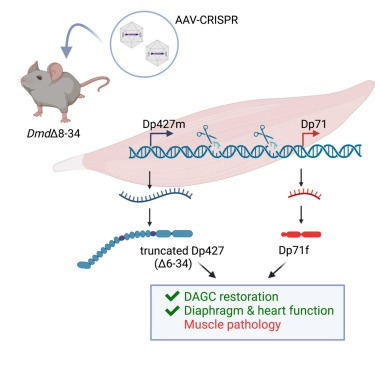
Schematic of AAV-CRISPR-mediated dystrophin gene editing in DmdΔ8-34 mdx mice, showing restoration of Dp427 and Dp71f isoforms and functional outcomes in cardiac and diaphragm muscles.

The mdx mouse has been at the forefront of CRISPR-Cas9 gene editing research for Duchenne muscular dystrophy. In 2014, the first successful correction of the dystrophin mutation using CRISPR-Cas9 was demonstrated directly in mdx mice, marking a historic milestone in gene editing therapy.

In 2018, researchers used AAV-delivered CRISPR-Cas9 to restore dystrophin expression in mdx mice following a single systemic injection, demonstrating the remarkable potential of this approach.

These results in mdx mice directly led to the first CRISPR-based clinical trials for DMD in human patients, representing a direct translation from mouse model to human medicine.
