= SNTG1 =

Protein-coding gene in the species Homo sapiens

Identifiers
- Aliases: SNTG1, G1SYN, SYN4, syntrophin gamma 1
- External IDs: OMIM: 608714; MGI: 1918346; GeneCards: SNTG1

Gene location (Human)
| Chr. | Chromosome 8 (human) |
| Band | 8q11.21 | Start | 49,909,789 bp |
| Band | 8q11.21 | End | 50,796,692 bp |

Gene location (Mouse)
| Chr. | Chromosome 1 (mouse) |
| Band | 1|1 A1-A2 | Start | 8,361,475 bp |
| Band | 1|1 A1-A2 | End | 9,299,878 bp |
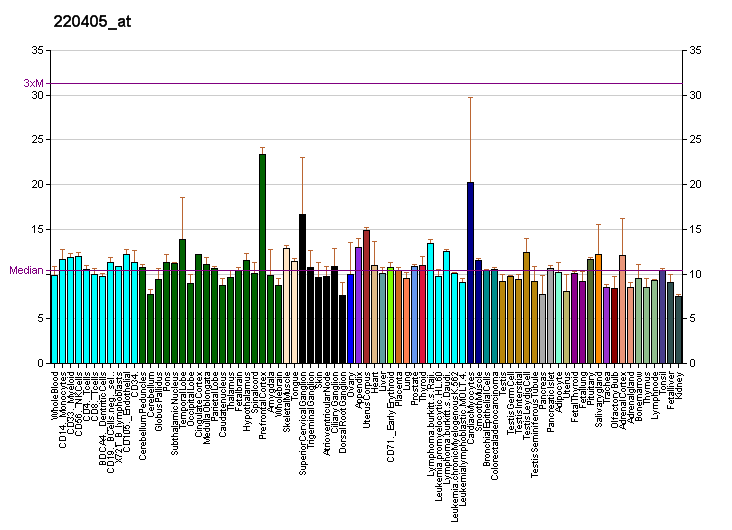
RNA expression pattern
| Bgee | Human / Mouse (ortholog); Top expressed in: Brodmann area 23; primary visual cortex; middle temporal gyrus; ventricular zone; testicle; dorsolateral prefrontal cortex; Brodmann area 9; nucleus accumbens; prefrontal cortex; caudate nucleus / Top expressed in: lumbar subsegment of spinal cord; dentate gyrus of hippocampal formation granule cell; spermatid; primary visual cortex; superior frontal gyrus; neural layer of retina; facial motor nucleus; embryo; cerebellar cortex; hippocampus proper; More reference expression data |
| BioGPS | More reference expression data |
Gene ontology
| Molecular function | actin binding; protein C-terminus binding; structural molecule activity |
| Cellular component | cytoplasm; ruffle membrane; syntrophin complex; cytoskeleton; nucleus; dystrophin-associated glycoprotein complex |
| Biological process | cell communication |
Sources:Amigo / QuickGO
Orthologs
| Databases | NCBI: entry; OMA: entry |
| Species | Human | Mouse |
| Entrez | 54212 | 71096 |
| Ensembl | ENSG00000147481 | ENSMUSG00000025909 |
| UniProt | Q9NSN8 | Q925E1 |
| RefSeq (mRNA) | NM_001287813; NM_001287814; NM_018967; NM_001321773; NM_001321775 NM_001321776; NM_001321777; NM_001321778 | NM_001290390; NM_001290392; NM_001290393; NM_027671 |
| RefSeq (protein) | NP_001274742; NP_001274743; NP_001308702; NP_001308704; NP_001308705 NP_001308706; NP_001308707; NP_061840; NP_001274742.1; NP_061840.1; NP_001308702.1 | NP_001277319; NP_001277321; NP_001277322; NP_081947 |
| Location (UCSC) | Chr 8: 49.91 – 50.8 Mb | Chr 1: 8.36 – 9.3 Mb |
| PubMed search |
- Wikidata
| View/Edit Human | View/Edit Mouse |

Gamma-1-syntrophin is a protein that in humans is encoded by the SNTG1 gene.

The protein encoded by this gene is a member of the syntrophin family. Syntrophins are cytoplasmic peripheral membrane proteins that typically contain 2 pleckstrin homology (PH) domains, a PDZ domain that bisects the first PH domain, and a C-terminal domain that mediates dystrophin binding. This gene is specifically expressed in the brain. Transcript variants for this gene have been described, but their full-length nature has not been determined.
