= Collagen, type XXIII, alpha 1 =

Mammalian protein found in humans

COL23A1

Identifiers
- Aliases: COL23A1, collagen type XXIII alpha 1 chain
- External IDs: OMIM: 610043; MGI: 2653243; GeneCards: COL23A1

Gene location (Human)
Chr.	Chromosome 5 (human)
Band	5q35.3	Start	178,237,476 bp
Band	5q35.3	End	178,590,393 bp

Gene location (Mouse)
Chr.	Chromosome 11 (mouse)
Band	11|11 B1.3	Start	51,180,747 bp
Band	11|11 B1.3	End	51,474,745 bp
RNA expression pattern
Bgee	Human / Mouse (ortholog); Top expressed in: right lobe of thyroid gland; left lobe of thyroid gland; apex of heart; left ventricle; gonad; testicle; gastric mucosa; mucosa of ileum; skin of abdomen; right frontal lobe / Top expressed in: median eminence; ciliary body; arcuate nucleus; iris; molar; sciatic nerve; external carotid artery; internal carotid artery; conjunctival fornix; otolith organ; More reference expression data
BioGPS	n/a
Gene ontology
Molecular function	protein binding; extracellular matrix structural constituent; extracellular matrix structural constituent conferring tensile strength
Cellular component	integral component of membrane; plasma membrane; collagen; endoplasmic reticulum lumen; membrane; extracellular space; extracellular matrix; collagen-containing extracellular matrix
Biological process	angiogenesis; endothelial cell morphogenesis; extracellular matrix organization
Sources:Amigo / QuickGO
Orthologs
Databases	NCBI: entry; OMA: entry
Species	Human	Mouse
Entrez	91522	237759
Ensembl	ENSG00000050767	ENSMUSG00000063564
UniProt	Q86Y22	Q8K4G2
RefSeq (mRNA)	NM_173465	NM_153393
RefSeq (protein)	NP_775736	NP_700442
Location (UCSC)	Chr 5: 178.24 – 178.59 Mb	Chr 11: 51.18 – 51.47 Mb
PubMed search
- Wikidata
View/Edit Human	View/Edit Mouse

Collagen α-1 (XXIII) chain is a protein encoded by COL23A1 gene, which is located on chromosome 5q35 in humans, and on chromosome 11B1+2 in mice. The location of this gene was discovered by genomic sequence analysis.

Collagen XXIII is a type II transmembrane protein and the fourth in the subfamily of non-fibrillar transmembranous collagens. This kind of collagens have a single pass hydrophobic transmembrane domain. The molecule of collagen XXIII can be found either in membrane-bond form or in shed form.

Type XXIII collagen is expressed in both adult tissues and developing organs. It can be found in the epidermis and other epithelia such as those in tongue, gut and lung, but also in the brain, the kidney and the cornea. It has been shown that in prostate collagen XXIII expression is associated with tumor progression.

The functions of collagen XXIII are still unknown, although it is believed that they could be similar to other transmembrane proteins, such as collagen XIII.

== Discovery ==
Collagen XXIII was first identified and isolated from rat prostate carcinoma cells by Jacqueline Banyard, Lere Bao and Bruce R. Zetter in 2003. They also identified this protein in human tissue. They concluded that at the nucleotide level, human and rat collagen XXIII alpha 1 show 76% identity. Furthermore, cellular localization of collagen XXIII was determined by immunofluorescence staining, using an antibody that recognizes the carboxyl terminus of the protein. It was demonstrated that the carboxyl terminus of collagen XXIII is present on the cell surface.

== Structure ==
=== Protein structure ===
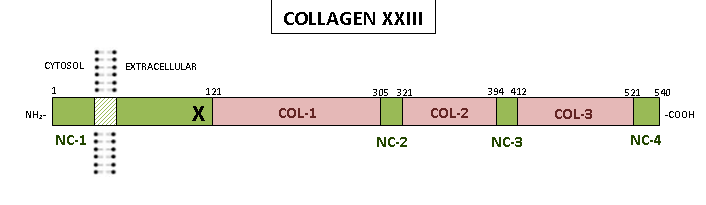

Human collagen α1(XXIII), which is a homotrimer, contains 540 amino acids distributed in:

- A long amino-terminal non-collagenous domain (NC-1) of 120 amino acids which can be divided in three parts: a short cytoplasmic region, a transmembrane region and a short extracellular region.
- A 420-amino-acid-long extracellular region organized in three collagenous (COL1, COL2 and COL3) domains which are interrupted by short non-collagenous domains (NC2, NC3 and NC4), as shown in the schematic.

=== Structural homology ===
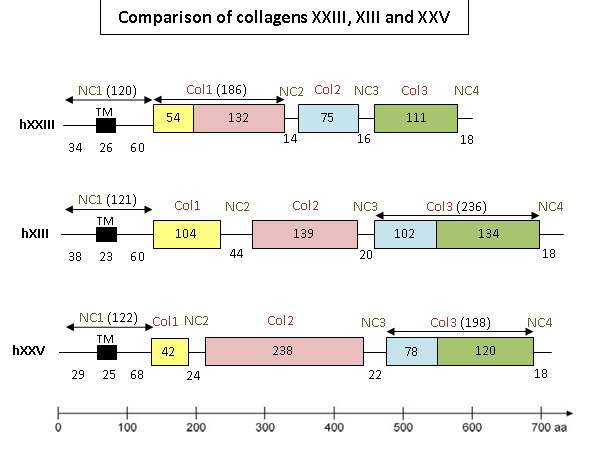
Comparison of collagens XXIII, XIII and XXV

Collagen XXIII belongs to the transmembranous subfamily of collagens. Proteins which are included in this group present an amino-terminal cytoplasmic domain followed by a membrane-spanning hydrophobic domain and at least one extracellular triple-helical collagenous domain alternated with short non-collagenous domains.

Collagens XIII, XVII, and XXV, and related proteins such as class A macrophage scavenger receptors, ectodysplasin A or the MARCO1 receptor, are also part of this group. An alternative name for this type of protein is MACITs (membrane-associated collagens with interrupted triple helices).

Collagen XXIII shows structural homology with collagen XIII and collagen XXV . Apart from having the characteristic structure of transmembranous collagens, all three proteins present a high level of amino acid residue conservation in collagenous and non-collagenous domains.

Collagens α1(XIII), α1(XXIII) and α1(XXV) display three collagenous domains (Col 1, Col 2, and Col 3) and four non-collagenous domains (NC1, which is also a transmembranous domain, NC2, NC3 and NC4).

It has been reported that Col 1 domain of α1(XXIII) shows similarities with regions of both Col 1 and Col 2 domains of collagen types α1(XIII) and α1(XXV), whilst sequences of Col 2 and Col 3 domains of α1(XXIII) are related to the Col 3 domain of types α1(XIII)and α1(XXV).

Short non-collagenous domains also exhibit similarities, especially in the NC1 and NC4 domains. Between 60 and 78% of the amino acid residues of these domains are identical in all three chains. Furthermore, possible recognition sequences for furin (a major physiological protease) cleavage sites have been found in both amino-terminal NC1 domain and carboxyl-terminal NC4 domain of each one of these collagens. The activity of this protease is vital to explain the origin of the two forms that collagen types XIII, XXIII and XXV can adopt.

=== Shedding ===
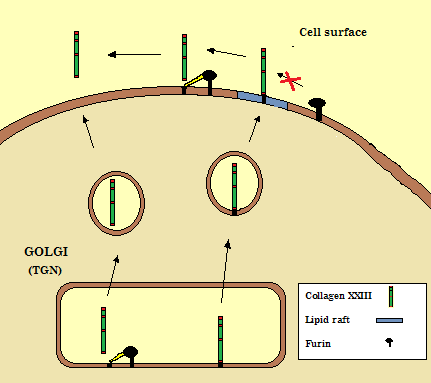
Collagen XXIII shedding in different compartments. Collagen XXIII molecule might be shed at Golgi apparatus or the cellular membrane. The molecule can also keep its full-length form as long as it is protected from the action of the sheddase (furin) by lipid rafts.

A common feature of transmembrane collagens is the presence of two forms of the molecule: a full-length membrane-bound form and an ectodomain shed form. This characteristic can be also applicable to collagen XXIII.

The distribution of both collagen XXIII forms is tissue-specific, since there are organs such as the brain where the shed form is predominant, whereas in the lungs the molecule is generally found as the full-length form.

It has been reported that the cell is able to regulate the amounts of collagen XXIII in the membrane-bound form and in the secreted shed form, influencing the production of one form or the other when it is needed. For that reason, the shedding process of collagen XXIII has been described as a selective proteolysis, carried out principally by furin, although there are other enzymes, like serine and cysteine proteases, which are able to shed the molecule too.

When collagen XXIII is inside the Golgi apparatus, furin proteases act, cleaving the protein and originating the shed form of the molecule, which will be released to the extracellular matrix by means of exocytosis.

There is also the possibility that the full-length form of the molecule reaches the cell surface before furin cleaves it. When this happens, the full molecule of collagen is introduced in the plasmatic membrane and is stabilized by its non-collagenous transmembranous domains, leaving the collagenous domains outside the cell.

Full-length molecules of collagen XXIII are usually found in lipid rafts, which are cholesterol-rich and sphingolipid-rich, tightly-packed microdomains of the cell membrane. Furin proteases are not able to reach collagen XXIII molecules when they are inside lipid rafts, therefore, collagen XXIII molecules can conserve their full-length form.

In case that these molecules lose the lipid raft protection (i.e. when membrane cholesterol levels decrease) furin proteases can act, cleaving the protein right outside the cell, releasing the shed form of collagen XXIII directly to the extracellular matrix.

== Interaction with integrin α2β1 ==
Cellular receptors for collagens belong to the family of β1 integrins. Collagen XXIII interacts in an ion-and conformation-dependent manner with integrin α2β1. Integrin α2β1 is a collagen-binding integrin present at the epidermis, therefore this is the location where the interaction takes place. Both proteins co-localize on basal keratinocytes surface.

== Clinical significance ==
Collagen XXIII plays a role as a biomarker for detection and recurrence of NCLSC cells (non-small cell lung carcinoma) and the reappearance of prostate cancer. Some experiments suggest that collagen XXIII influences cellular adhesion and stimulates metastasis development by facilitating cancer cells growth and survival when they are rounded and not able to spread. It has been shown that loss of collagen XXIII may complicate cellular adhesion and reduce lung cancer cell retention.

== See also ==
- Collagen
- Protein domain
- Transmembrane protein
- Non-small-cell lung carcinoma
- Prostate cancer
- Homotrimer
- Lipid raft
- Integrin, beta 1
