= Collagen, type XVII, alpha 1 =

Mammalian protein found in humans

COL17A1

Identifiers
- Aliases: COL17A1, BA16H23.2, BP180, BPA-2, BPAG2, LAD-1, ERED, collagen type XVII alpha 1, collagen type XVII alpha 1 chain, JEB4
- External IDs: OMIM: 113811; MGI: 88450; GeneCards: COL17A1

Gene location (Human)
Chr.	Chromosome 10 (human)
Band	10q25.1	Start	104,031,286 bp
Band	10q25.1	End	104,085,880 bp

Gene location (Mouse)
Chr.	Chromosome 19 (mouse)
Band	19 D1|19 40.07 cM	Start	47,634,783 bp
Band	19 D1|19 40.07 cM	End	47,680,533 bp
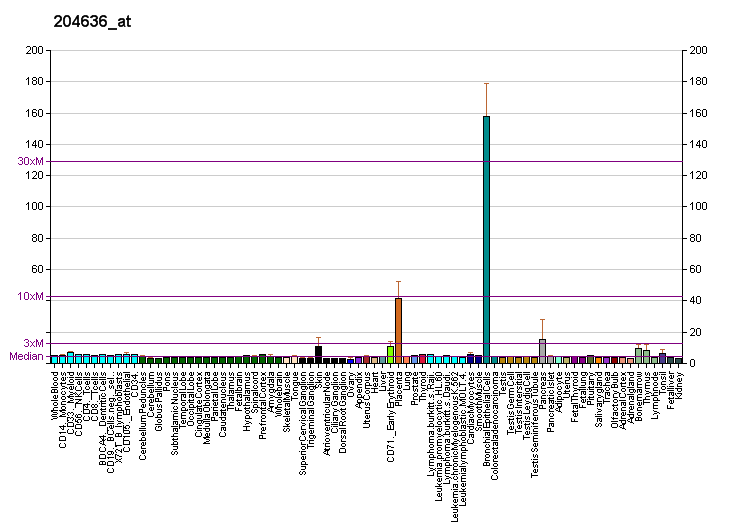
RNA expression pattern
Bgee	Human / Mouse (ortholog); Top expressed in: skin of abdomen; skin of leg; skin of arm; mucosa of transverse colon; minor salivary glands; rectum; skin of thigh; skin of hip; olfactory zone of nasal mucosa; right testis / Top expressed in: corneal stroma; skin of external ear; lip; conjunctival fornix; molar; skin of back; esophagus; skin of abdomen; epidermis; female urethra; More reference expression data
BioGPS	More reference expression data
Gene ontology
Molecular function	protein binding; extracellular matrix structural constituent; extracellular matrix structural constituent conferring tensile strength
Cellular component	integral component of membrane; extracellular region; basement membrane; cell junction; plasma membrane; collagen; integral component of plasma membrane; hemidesmosome; endoplasmic reticulum lumen; membrane; cell-cell junction; extracellular space; extracellular matrix; collagen-containing extracellular matrix
Biological process	hemidesmosome assembly; cell-matrix adhesion; epidermis development; regulation of immune response; extracellular matrix organization
Sources:Amigo / QuickGO
Orthologs
Databases	NCBI: entry; OMA: entry
Species	Human	Mouse
Entrez	1308	12821
Ensembl	ENSG00000065618	ENSMUSG00000025064
UniProt	Q9UMD9	Q07563
RefSeq (mRNA)	NM_130778; NM_000494	NM_007732; NM_001290825
RefSeq (protein)	NP_000485	NP_001277754; NP_031758
Location (UCSC)	Chr 10: 104.03 – 104.09 Mb	Chr 19: 47.63 – 47.68 Mb
PubMed search
- Wikidata
View/Edit Human	View/Edit Mouse

Collagen XVII, previously called BP180, is a transmembrane protein which plays a critical role in maintaining the linkage between the intracellular and the extracellular structural elements involved in epidermal adhesion, identified by Diaz and colleagues in 1990.

COL17A1 is the official name of the gene. It encodes the alpha chain of type XVII collagen. Collagen XVII is a transmembrane protein, like collagen XIII, XXIII and XXV. Collagen XVII is a structural component of hemidesmosomes, multiprotein complexes at the dermal-epidermal basement membrane zone that mediate adhesion of keratinocytes to the underlying membrane. It also appears to be a key protein in maintaining the integrity of the corneal epithelium. Mutations in this gene are associated with both generalized atrophic benign and junctional epidermolysis bullosa, as well as recurrent corneal erosions, and expression of this gene is abnormal in various cancers. Two homotrimeric forms of type XVII collagen exist. The full length form is the transmembrane protein. A soluble form, referred to as either ectodomain or LAD-1, is generated by proteolytic processing of the full length form.

== Structure ==
Collagen XVII is a homotrimer of three alpha1(XVII)-chains and a transmembrane protein in type II orientation. Each 180 kD a-chain contains a globular intracellular domain of approximately 70 kDa, which interacts with beta4-integrin, plectin, and BP230 and is necessary for the stable attachment of hemidesmosomes to keratin intermediate filaments. The large C-terminal ectodomain with a molecular mass of approximately 120 kDa consists of 15 collagenous subdomains, characterized by typical collagenous G-X-Y repeat sequences, flanked by 16 short non-collagenous stretches. The overall structure of the ectodomain is that of a flexible, rod-like triple helix with a significant thermal stability. The membrane proximal part of the ectodomain, within amino acids 506-519, is responsible for binding to alpha 6 integrin, this binding seems to be important for the collagen XVII integration into hemidesmosomes. The largest collagenous domain, Col15, which contains 232 amino acids (amino acids 567-808), contributes significantly to stability of collagen XVII homotrimer. The C-terminus of collagen XVII binds to laminin 5, and correct integration of laminin 5 into the matrix requires collagen XVII.

== Pathology ==
Mutations in the human collagen XVII gene, COL17A1, lead to the absence or structural alterations and mutations of collagen XVII. The functional consequences include diminished epidermal adhesion and skin blistering in response to minimal shearing forces. The disorder caused by biallelic COL17A1 mutations and is called junctional epidermolysis bullosa, an autosomal recessive skin disease with variable clinical phenotypes. Morphological characteristics of junctional epidermolysis bullosa are rudimentary hemidesmosomes and subepidermal tissue separation. Clinical hallmarks, in addition to blisters and erosions of the skin and mucous membranes, include nail dystrophy, loss of hair, and dental anomalies.

Collagen XVII also plays a role as an autoantigen in Bullous pemphigoid (BP) and herpes gestationis (HG), both acquired subepithelial blistering disorders. Most immunodominant epitopes lie within the NC16A domain, and the binding of the autoantibodies perturbs adhesive functions of the collagen XVII, and this (together with inflammation-related processes) leads to epidermal-dermal separation and skin blistering.

Other mutations make the epithelium of the cornea in the eye brittle, which results in dominantly inherited recurrent corneal erosion dystrophy (ERED). Whole-exome sequencing first identified a heterozygous mutation (c.2816C>T, p.T939I) that segregated with ERED in a large Swedish pedigree dating back 200 years. Another synonymous mutation (c.3156C>T) was proposed to introduce a cryptic donor site, resulting in aberrant splicing, a theory which subsequently was confirmed in several families with ERED from different countries.

== Cancer ==
Expression of the COL17A1 gene is abnormal in various cancers. For example, it was found abnormal in five epithelial cancer types, including breast cancer, cervical cancer, head and neck cancer and two types of lung cancer. Decreased expression was observed for breast cancer, while increased expression was observed for the other cancers.

== Shedding ==
Collagen XVII is constitutively shed from the keratinocyte surface within NC16A domain by TACE (TNF-Alpha Converting Enzyme), metalloproteinase of the ADAM family. The shedding is lipid raft dependent. Collagen XVII is extracellularly phosphorylated by ecto-casein kinase 2 within the NC16A domain, phosphorylation negatively regulates ectodomain shedding.

== SPARC and osteogenesis imperfecta ==
The SPARC gene is completely associated with homozygous mutations in collagen XVII, which in turn causes a type of osteogenesis imperfecta.

== Interactions ==
Collagen, type XVII, alpha 1 has been shown to interact with Keratin 18, Actinin alpha 4, Dystonin, Actinin, alpha 1, CTNND1 and ITGB4.

== See also ==
- List of target antigens in pemphigoid
