= Dystrophin-associated protein =

Human protein

A dystrophin-associated protein is a protein that helps to form the connection between intracellular dystrophin and the extracellular basal lamina.

Examples include sarcoglycan and dystroglycan.

Dystrophin-associated proteins contribute to mechanical stabilization of the muscle-cell membrane during contraction, and loss of these proteins may increase plasma membrane fragility. Because of its role in muscle-cell stability, the dystrophin-associated protein complex has been studied using mass spectrometry to identify protein interactors, analyze post-translational glycan modifications of α-dystroglycan, and measure dystrophin levels in healthy and dystrophic skeletal muscle.
