= Collagen, type XIII, alpha 1 =

Protein found in humans

COL13A1

Identifiers
- Aliases: COL13A1, COLXIIIA1, CMS19, collagen type XIII alpha 1, collagen type XIII alpha 1 chain
- External IDs: OMIM: 120350; MGI: 1277201; GeneCards: COL13A1

Gene location (Human)
Chr.	Chromosome 10 (human)
Band	10q22.1	Start	69,801,880 bp
Band	10q22.1	End	69,964,275 bp

Gene location (Mouse)
Chr.	Chromosome 10 (mouse)
Band	10 32.29 cM|10 B4	Start	61,674,015 bp
Band	10 32.29 cM|10 B4	End	61,814,887 bp
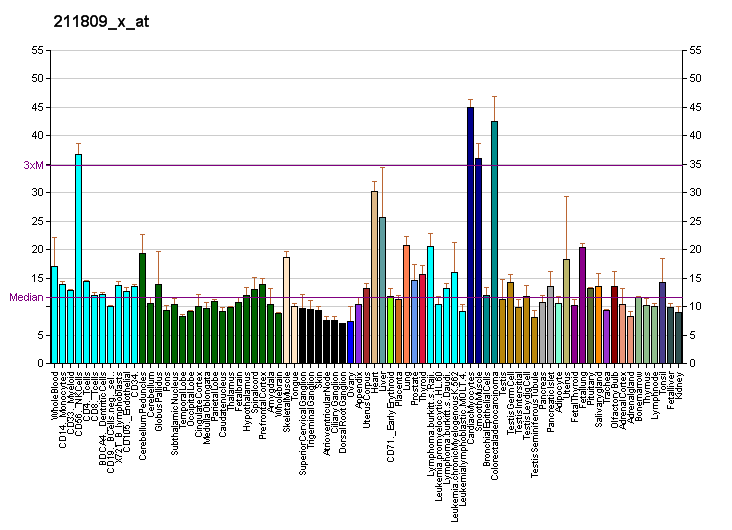

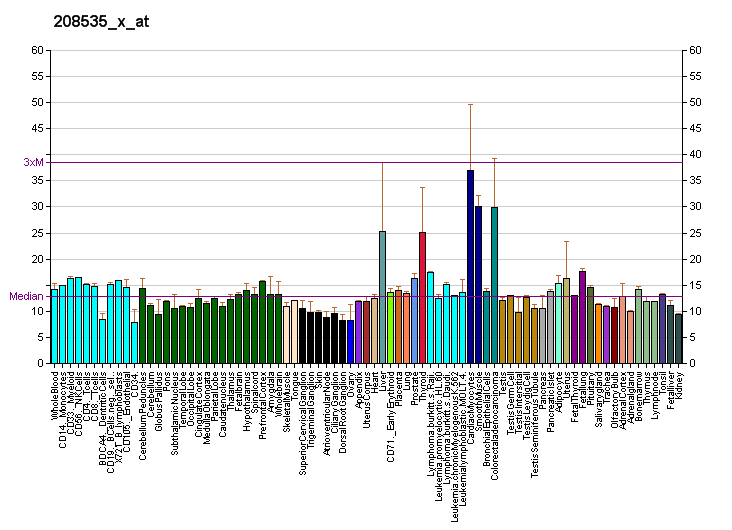

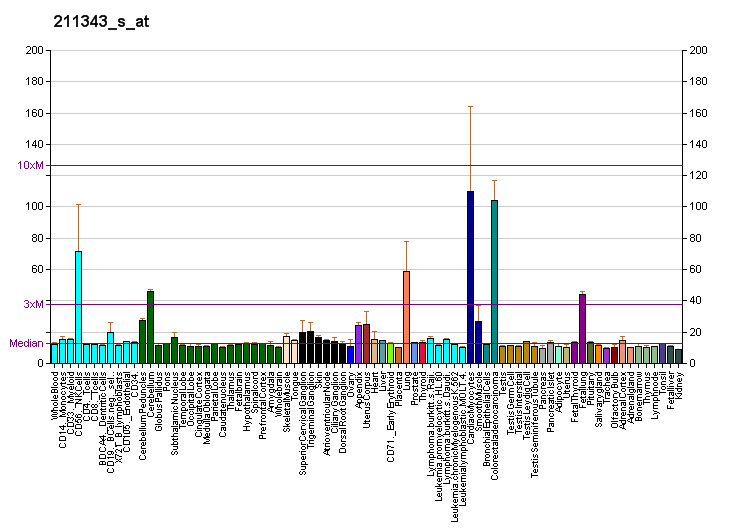
RNA expression pattern
Bgee	Human / Mouse (ortholog); Top expressed in: cerebellar hemisphere; right hemisphere of cerebellum; periodontal fiber; tibia; corpus epididymis; ascending aorta; cerebellar vermis; tail of epididymis; popliteal artery; tibial arteries / Top expressed in: Meckel's cartilage; left lung lobe; body of femur; mandibular molars; calvaria; fossa; right lung; right lung lobe; Gonadal ridge; efferent ductule; More reference expression data
BioGPS	More reference expression data
Gene ontology
Molecular function	heparin binding; protein binding; extracellular matrix structural constituent; extracellular matrix structural constituent conferring tensile strength
Cellular component	integral component of membrane; extracellular region; plasma membrane; collagen; endoplasmic reticulum lumen; membrane; cell-cell junction; collagen type XIII trimer; synapse; postsynaptic membrane; cell junction; extracellular space; extracellular matrix; collagen-containing extracellular matrix
Biological process	collagen catabolic process; multicellular organism development; cell differentiation; cell-matrix adhesion; extracellular matrix organization; endochondral ossification; cell adhesion; ossification; morphogenesis of a branching structure; cell-cell adhesion
Sources:Amigo / QuickGO
Orthologs
Databases	NCBI: entry; OMA: entry
Species	Human	Mouse
Entrez	1305	12817
Ensembl	ENSG00000197467	ENSMUSG00000058806
UniProt	Q5TAT6	Q9R1N9
RefSeq (mRNA)	NM_001130103; NM_005203; NM_080798; NM_080799; NM_080800 NM_080801; NM_080802; NM_080803; NM_080804; NM_080805; NM_080806; NM_080807; NM_080808; NM_080809; NM_080810; NM_080811; NM_080812; NM_080813; NM_080814; NM_080815; NM_001320951; NM_001368882; NM_001368883; NM_001368884; NM_001368885; NM_001368886; NM_001368895; NM_001368896; NM_001368897; NM_001368898	NM_007731; NM_001304757
RefSeq (protein)	NP_001123575; NP_001307880; NP_542988; NP_542990; NP_542991 NP_542992; NP_542995; NP_001355811; NP_001355812; NP_001355813; NP_001355814; NP_001355815; NP_001355824; NP_001355825; NP_001355826; NP_001355827	NP_001291686; NP_031757
Location (UCSC)	Chr 10: 69.8 – 69.96 Mb	Chr 10: 61.67 – 61.81 Mb
PubMed search
- Wikidata
View/Edit Human	View/Edit Mouse

Collagen alpha-1(XIII) chain is a protein that in humans is encoded by the COL13A1 gene.

This gene encodes the alpha chain of one of the nonfibrillar collagens. The function of this gene product is not known, however, it has been detected at low levels in all connective tissue-producing cells so it may serve a general function in connective tissues. Unlike most of the collagens, which are secreted into the extracellular matrix, collagen XIII contains a transmembrane domain and the protein has been localized to the plasma membrane. The transcripts for this gene undergo complex and extensive splicing involving at least eight exons. Like other collagens, collagen XIII is a trimer; it is not known whether this trimer is composed of one or more than one alpha chain isomer. A number of alternatively spliced transcript variants have been described, but the full length nature of some of them has not been determined. Collagen XIII belongs to the transmembranous subfamily of collagens, like collagen XVII, XXIII and XXV.
