= Type XXVII collagen =

Type XXVII collagen is the protein predicted to be encoded by COL27A1. It was first described by Dr. James M. Pace and his colleagues at the University of Washington. It is related to the fibrillar collagens: type II, type XI, and type XXIV. Current research suggests that it is made by cartilage during skeletal development.
