= NADH dehydrogenase (ubiquinone), alpha 1 =

Protein-coding gene in the species Homo sapiens

NDUFA1

Identifiers
- Aliases: NDUFA1, CI-MWFE, MWFE, ZNF183, NADH dehydrogenase (ubiquinone), alpha 1, NADH:ubiquinone oxidoreductase subunit A1, MC1DN12
- External IDs: OMIM: 300078; MGI: 1929511; GeneCards: NDUFA1

Gene location (Human)
| Chr. | X chromosome (human) |
| Band | Xq24 | Start | 119,871,832 bp |
| Band | Xq24 | End | 119,876,662 bp |

Gene location (Mouse)
| Chr. | X chromosome (mouse) |
| Band | X|X A3.3 | Start | 36,451,241 bp |
| Band | X|X A3.3 | End | 36,454,816 bp |
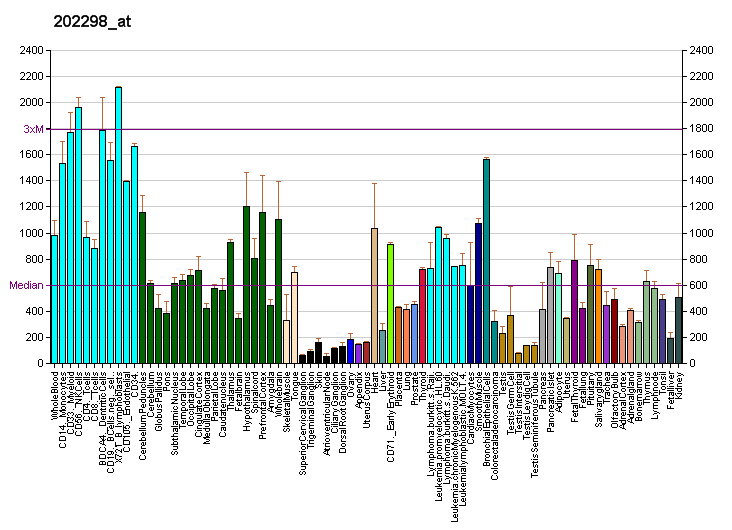
RNA expression pattern
| Bgee | Human / Mouse (ortholog); Top expressed in: myocardium of left ventricle; right ventricle; apex of heart; right auricle of heart; cardiac muscle tissue of right atrium; mucosa of transverse colon; Brodmann area 10; renal medulla; Brodmann area 9; muscle of thigh / Top expressed in: Epithelium of choroid plexus; seminal vesicula; facial motor nucleus; vestibular membrane of cochlear duct; vestibular sensory epithelium; epithelium of lens; molar; right kidney; lobe of prostate; extraocular muscle; More reference expression data |
| BioGPS | More reference expression data |
Gene ontology
| Molecular function | NADH dehydrogenase (ubiquinone) activity |
| Cellular component | integral component of membrane; mitochondrion; mitochondrial respiratory chain complex I; respirasome; mitochondrial inner membrane; membrane; mitochondrial membranes; cytosol |
| Biological process | mitochondrial electron transport, NADH to ubiquinone; mitochondrial respiratory chain complex I assembly |
Sources:Amigo / QuickGO
Orthologs
| Databases | NCBI: entry; OMA: entry |
| Species | Human | Mouse |
| Entrez | 4694 | 54405 |
| Ensembl | ENSG00000125356 | ENSMUSG00000016427 |
| UniProt | O15239 | O35683 |
| RefSeq (mRNA) | NM_004541 | NM_019443 |
| RefSeq (protein) | NP_004532 | NP_062316 |
| Location (UCSC) | Chr X: 119.87 – 119.88 Mb | Chr X: 36.45 – 36.45 Mb |
| PubMed search |
- Wikidata
| View/Edit Human | View/Edit Mouse |

NADH dehydrogenase [ubiquinone] 1 alpha subcomplex subunit 1 is a protein that in humans is encoded by the NDUFA1 gene. The NDUFA1 protein is a subunit of NADH dehydrogenase (ubiquinone), which is located in the mitochondrial inner membrane and is the largest of the five complexes of the electron transport chain. Mutations in the NDUFA1 gene are associated with mitochondrial Complex I deficiency.

== Structure ==
The NDUFA1 gene is located on the long q arm of the X chromosome at position 24 and it spans 5,176 base pairs. The NDUFA1 gene produces an 8.1 kDa protein composed of 70 amino acids. NDUFA1 is a subunit of the enzyme NADH dehydrogenase (ubiquinone), the largest of the respiratory complexes. The structure is L-shaped with a long, hydrophobic transmembrane domain and a hydrophilic domain for the peripheral arm that includes all the known redox centers and the NADH binding site. NDUFA1 is one of about 31 hydrophobic subunits that form the transmembrane region of Complex I. It has been noted that the N-terminal hydrophobic domain has the potential to be folded into an alpha helix spanning the inner mitochondrial membrane with a C-terminal hydrophilic domain interacting with globular subunits of Complex I. The highly conserved two-domain structure suggests that this feature is critical for the protein function and that the hydrophobic domain acts as an anchor for the NADH dehydrogenase (ubiquinone) complex at the inner mitochondrial membrane.

== Function ==
The human NDUFA1 gene codes for a subunit of Complex I of the respiratory chain, which transfers electrons from NADH to ubiquinone. However, NDUFA1 is an accessory subunit of the complex that is believed not to be involved in catalysis. Initially, NADH binds to Complex I and transfers two electrons to the isoalloxazine ring of the flavin mononucleotide (FMN) prosthetic arm to form FMNH_{2}. The electrons are transferred through a series of iron-sulfur (Fe-S) clusters in the prosthetic arm and finally to coenzyme Q10 (CoQ), which is reduced to ubiquinol (CoQH_{2}). The flow of electrons changes the redox state of the protein, resulting in a conformational change and pK shift of the ionizable side chain, which pumps four hydrogen ions out of the mitochondrial matrix.

== Clinical significance ==
Mitochondrial complex I deficiency (MT-C1D) is caused by mutations affecting the NDUFA1 gene. Complex I deficiency is a disorder of the mitochondrial respiratory chain that causes a wide range of clinical manifestations, from lethal neonatal disease to adult-onset neurodegenerative disorders. Phenotypes include macrocephaly with progressive leukodystrophy, non-specific encephalopathy, cardiomyopathy, myopathy, liver disease, Leigh syndrome, Leber's hereditary optic neuropathy, and some forms of Parkinson's disease. Mutations on the X chromosome that affect this gene have included the G94C mutation, which has been associated with lactic acidosis, hypotonia, increased beta-hydroxybutyrate/acetoacetate ratio, and complex I deficiency.

== Interactions ==
NDUFA1 has been shown to have 7 binary protein-protein interactions including 3 co-complex interactions. NDUFA1 appears to interact with GOLGB1, TRIM63, and SMURF2.
