= Chemokine-like protein TAFA-1 =

Protein-coding gene in the species Homo sapiens

TAFA1

Identifiers
- Aliases: TAFA1, TAFA-1, Family with sequence similarity 19 (chemokine (C-C motif)-like), member A1, family with sequence similarity 19 member A1, C-C motif chemokine like, FAM19A1, TAFA chemokine like family member 1
- External IDs: OMIM: 617495; MGI: 2443695; HomoloGene: 45655; GeneCards: TAFA1; OMA:TAFA1 - orthologs

Gene location (Human)
Chr.	Chromosome 3 (human)
Band	3p14.1	Start	68,004,247 bp
Band	3p14.1	End	68,545,621 bp

Gene location (Mouse)
Chr.	Chromosome 6 (mouse)
Band	6|6 D3	Start	96,090,135 bp
Band	6|6 D3	End	96,634,159 bp
RNA expression pattern
Bgee	Human / Mouse (ortholog); Top expressed in: middle temporal gyrus; endothelial cell; Brodmann area 23; pons; Brodmann area 46; superior frontal gyrus; entorhinal cortex; postcentral gyrus; primary visual cortex; dorsolateral prefrontal cortex / Top expressed in: piriform cortex; subdivision of hippocampus; Region I of hippocampus proper; hippocampus proper; lumbar spinal ganglion; dentate gyrus; pontine nuclei; dentate gyrus of hippocampal formation granule cell; primary visual cortex; amygdala; More reference expression data
BioGPS	n/a
Gene ontology
Molecular function	protein binding; receptor ligand activity
Cellular component	endoplasmic reticulum; extracellular region; extracellular space
Biological process	regulation of signaling receptor activity; neuroblast differentiation; regulation of neuroblast proliferation; signal transduction
Sources:Amigo / QuickGO
Orthologs
Species	Human	Mouse
Entrez	407738	320265
Ensembl	ENSG00000183662	ENSMUSG00000059187
UniProt	Q7Z5A9	Q7TPG8
RefSeq (mRNA)	NM_213609; NM_001252216	NM_182808
RefSeq (protein)	NP_001239145; NP_998774	NP_877960
Location (UCSC)	Chr 3: 68 – 68.55 Mb	Chr 6: 96.09 – 96.63 Mb
PubMed search
- Wikidata
View/Edit Human	View/Edit Mouse

Chemokine-like protein TAFA-1 is a protein that in humans is encoded by the TAFA1 gene.

This gene is a member of the TAFA family which is composed of five highly homologous genes that encode small secreted proteins. These proteins contain conserved cysteine residues at fixed positions, and are distantly related to MIP-1alpha, a member of the CC-chemokine family. The TAFA proteins are predominantly expressed in specific regions of the brain, and are postulated to function as brain-specific chemokines or neurokines that act as regulators of immune and nervous cells.
