= Collagen, type XXVII, alpha 1 =

Protein found in humans

COL27A1

Identifiers
- Aliases: COL27A1, STLS, collagen type XXVII alpha 1, collagen type XXVII alpha 1 chain
- External IDs: OMIM: 608461; MGI: 2672118; GeneCards: COL27A1

Gene location (Human)
Chr.	Chromosome 9 (human)
Band	9q32	Start	114,155,537 bp
Band	9q32	End	114,312,511 bp

Gene location (Mouse)
Chr.	Chromosome 4 (mouse)
Band	4|4 B3	Start	63,214,004 bp
Band	4|4 B3	End	63,334,991 bp
RNA expression pattern
Bgee	Human / Mouse (ortholog); Top expressed in: tibia; cerebellar vermis; pancreatic ductal cell; canal of the cervix; pylorus; cartilage tissue; cerebellar hemisphere; renal medulla; right hemisphere of cerebellum; skin of arm / Top expressed in: molar; lesser wing of sphenoid bone; stria vascularis; otolith organ; utricle; internal carotid artery; hand; index finger; phalanx of index finger; rib; More reference expression data
BioGPS	n/a
Gene ontology
Molecular function	extracellular matrix structural constituent; metal ion binding; extracellular matrix structural constituent conferring tensile strength
Cellular component	extracellular region; fibrillar collagen trimer; collagen; endoplasmic reticulum lumen; extracellular space; extracellular matrix; collagen-containing extracellular matrix
Biological process	growth plate cartilage chondrocyte development; extracellular matrix organization
Sources:Amigo / QuickGO
Orthologs
Databases	NCBI: entry; OMA: entry
Species	Human	Mouse
Entrez	85301	373864
Ensembl	ENSG00000196739	ENSMUSG00000045672
UniProt	Q8IZC6	Q5QNQ9
RefSeq (mRNA)	NM_032161; NM_032888	NM_025685
RefSeq (protein)	NP_116277	NP_079961
Location (UCSC)	Chr 9: 114.16 – 114.31 Mb	Chr 4: 63.21 – 63.33 Mb
PubMed search
- Wikidata
View/Edit Human	View/Edit Mouse

Collagen alpha-1 (XXVII) chain (COL27A1) is a protein that in humans is encoded by the COL27A1 gene.

COL27A1 is a type XXVII collagen. It was discovered by James Pace. This gene appears to be turned on in cartilage, the eye, and in the ear. Type XXVII collagen is related to the "fibrillar" class of collagens and may play a role in development of the skeleton.

Fibrillar collagens, such as COL27A1, compose one of the most ancient families of extracellular matrix molecules. They form major structural elements in extracellular matrices of cartilage, skin, and tendon.

== Location ==
COL27A1 is located on chromosome 9 in homo sapiens specifically on spot number 32.
