= Crystallin, beta A1 =

Protein-coding gene in the species Homo sapiens

CRYBA1

Identifiers
- Aliases: CRYBA1, CRYB1, CTRCT10, crystallin beta A1
- External IDs: OMIM: 123610; MGI: 88518; GeneCards: CRYBA1

Gene location (Human)
Chr.	Chromosome 17 (human)
Band	17q11.2	Start	29,246,859 bp
Band	17q11.2	End	29,254,494 bp

Gene location (Mouse)
Chr.	Chromosome 11 (mouse)
Band	11 B5|11 46.74 cM	Start	77,609,441 bp
Band	11 B5|11 46.74 cM	End	77,616,109 bp
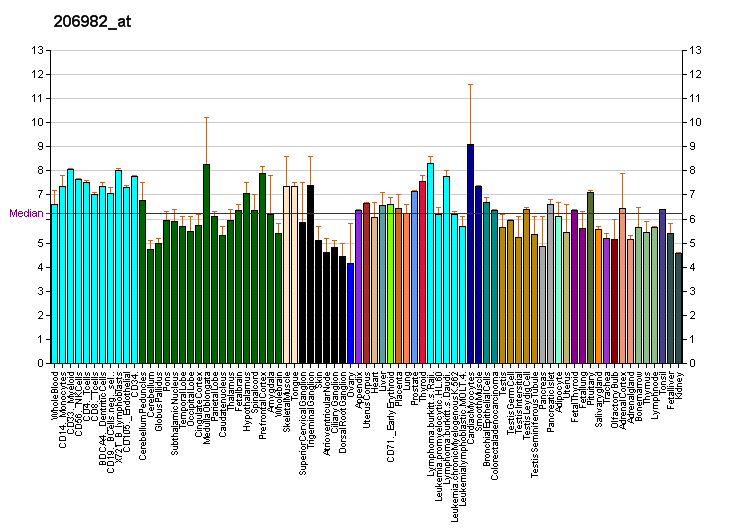
RNA expression pattern
Bgee	Human / Mouse (ortholog); Top expressed in: lens; gonad; testicle; granulocyte; monocyte; corpus callosum; Achilles tendon; blood; ascending aorta; right lung / Top expressed in: epithelium of lens; corneal stroma; ciliary body; retinal pigment epithelium; conjunctival fornix; neural layer of retina; iris; human fetus; sexually immature organism; embryo; More reference expression data
BioGPS	More reference expression data
Gene ontology
Molecular function	protein binding; structural constituent of eye lens; molecular function
Cellular component	cytoplasm; nucleus
Biological process	negative regulation of ERK1 and ERK2 cascade; negative regulation of TOR signaling; negative regulation of protein kinase B signaling; positive regulation of anoikis; lens development in camera-type eye; negative regulation of cytokine production; visual perception; negative regulation of phosphatidylinositol 3-kinase signaling
Sources:Amigo / QuickGO
Orthologs
Databases	NCBI: entry; OMA: entry
Species	Human	Mouse
Entrez	1411	12957
Ensembl	ENSG00000108255	ENSMUSG00000000724
UniProt	P05813	P02525; Q9QXC6
RefSeq (mRNA)	NM_005208	NM_009965; NM_001313933
RefSeq (protein)	NP_005199	NP_001300862; NP_034095
Location (UCSC)	Chr 17: 29.25 – 29.25 Mb	Chr 11: 77.61 – 77.62 Mb
PubMed search
- Wikidata
View/Edit Human	View/Edit Mouse

Beta-crystallin A3 is a protein that in humans is encoded by the CRYBA1 gene.

Crystallins are separated into two classes: taxon-specific, or enzyme, and ubiquitous. The latter class constitutes the major proteins of vertebrate eye lens and maintains the transparency and refractive index of the lens. Since lens central fiber cells lose their nuclei during development, these crystallins are made and then retained throughout life, making them extremely stable proteins. Mammalian lens crystallins are divided into alpha, beta, and gamma families; beta and gamma crystallins are also considered as a superfamily. Alpha and beta families are further divided into acidic and basic groups. Seven protein regions exist in crystallins: four homologous motifs, a connecting peptide, and N- and C-terminal extensions. Beta-crystallins, the most heterogeneous, differ by the presence of the C-terminal extension (present in the basic group, none in the acidic group). Beta-crystallins form aggregates of different sizes and are able to self-associate to form dimers or to form heterodimers with other beta-crystallins. This gene, a beta acidic group member, encodes two proteins (crystallin, beta A3 and crystallin, beta A1) from a single mRNA, the latter protein is 17 aa shorter than crystallin, beta A3 and is generated by use of an alternate translation initiation site. Deletion of exons 3 and 4 causes the autosomal dominant disease 'zonular cataract with sutural opacities'.
