= SNTB1 =

Protein-coding gene in the species Homo sapiens

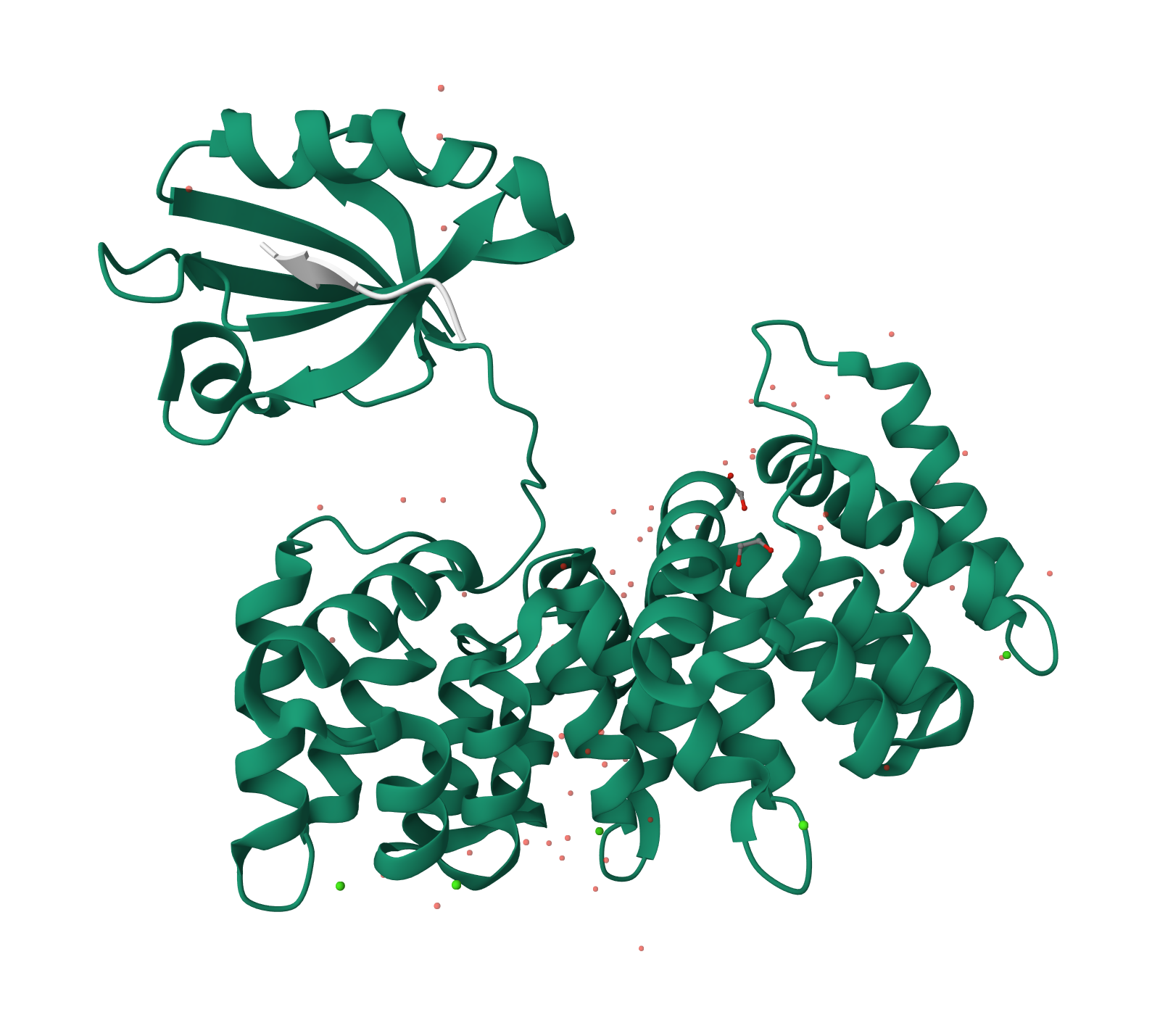

Identifiers
- Aliases: SNTB1, 59-DAP, A1B, BSYN2, DAPA1B, SNT2, SNT2B1, TIP-43, syntrophin beta 1
- External IDs: OMIM: 600026; MGI: 101781; GeneCards: SNTB1

Gene location (Mouse)
Chr.	Chromosome 15 (mouse)
Band	15 D1|15 22.14 cM	Start	55,499,784 bp
Band	15 D1|15 22.14 cM	End	55,770,345 bp
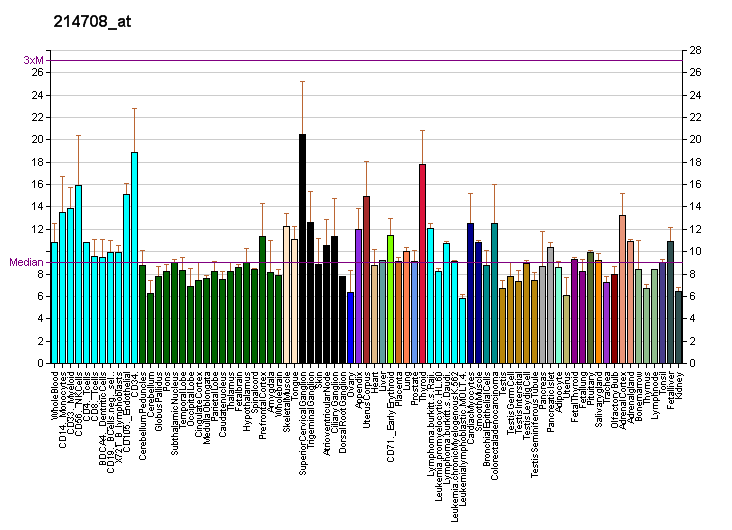

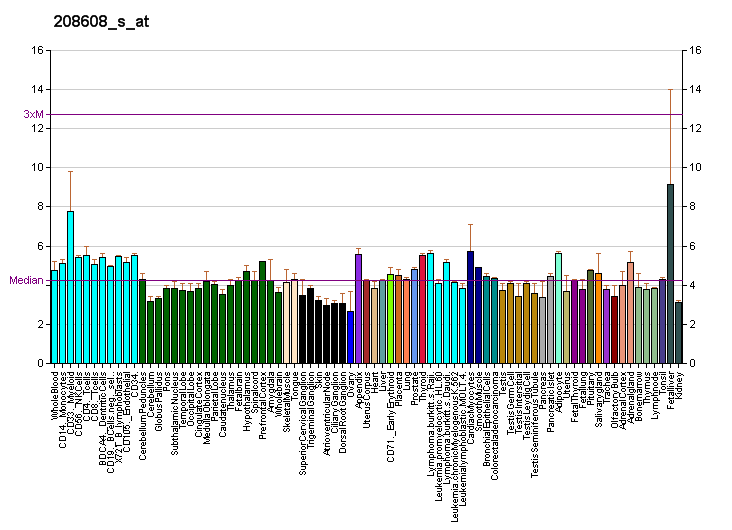
RNA expression pattern
Bgee	Human / Mouse (ortholog); Top expressed in: right adrenal gland; left adrenal gland; right lobe of liver; bronchial epithelial cell; right lobe of thyroid gland; left lobe of thyroid gland; retinal pigment epithelium; parotid gland; monocyte; lower lobe of lung / Top expressed in: parotid gland; lacrimal gland; ascending aorta; submandibular gland; lumbar spinal ganglion; ciliary body; vestibular membrane of cochlear duct; iris; aortic valve; retinal pigment epithelium; More reference expression data
BioGPS	More reference expression data
Gene ontology
Molecular function	actin binding; PDZ domain binding; protein binding; structural molecule activity; calmodulin binding
Cellular component	cytoplasm; cell junction; sarcolemma; plasma membrane; synapse; dystrophin-associated glycoprotein complex; cytoskeleton; membrane; focal adhesion; protein-containing complex
Biological process	muscle contraction
Sources:Amigo / QuickGO
Orthologs
Databases	NCBI: entry
Species	Human	Mouse
Entrez	6641	20649
Ensembl	n/a	ENSMUSG00000060429
UniProt	Q13884	Q99L88
RefSeq (mRNA)	NM_021021	NM_016667
RefSeq (protein)	NP_066301	NP_057876
Location (UCSC)	n/a	Chr 15: 55.5 – 55.77 Mb
PubMed search
- Wikidata
View/Edit Human	View/Edit Mouse

Beta-1-syntrophin is a protein that in humans is encoded by the SNTB1 gene.

== Function ==
Dystrophin is a large, rod-like cytoskeletal protein found at the inner surface of muscle fibers. Dystrophin is missing in Duchenne Muscular Dystrophy patients and is present in reduced amounts in Becker Muscular Dystrophy patients. The protein encoded by this gene is a peripheral membrane protein found associated with dystrophin and dystrophin-related proteins. This gene is a member of the syntrophin gene family, which contains at least two other structurally related genes.

== Interactions ==
SNTB1 has been shown to interact with Dystrophin.
