= SPANXA1 =

Protein-coding gene in the species Homo sapiens

Identifiers
- Aliases: SPANXA1, CT11.1, NAP-X, SPAN-X, SPAN-Xa, SPAN-Xb, SPANX, SPANX-A, Sperm protein associated with the nucleus, X-linked, family member A1, CT11.3
- External IDs: OMIM: 300305; GeneCards: SPANXA1

Gene location (Human)
Chr.	X chromosome (human)
Band	Xq27.2	Start	141,583,674 bp
Band	Xq27.2	End	141,585,011 bp
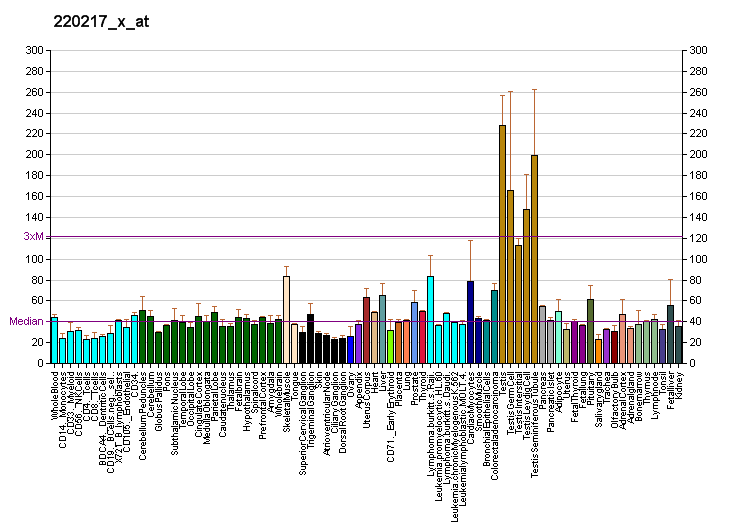

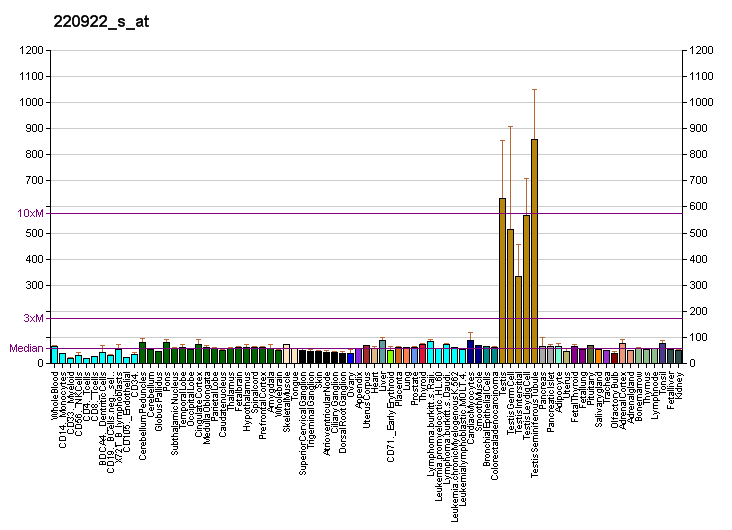
RNA expression pattern
Bgee	Human / Mouse (ortholog); Top expressed in: testicle; left testis; right testis; gonad; right coronary artery; Descending thoracic aorta; ascending aorta; blood; urinary system; kidney / n/a; More reference expression data
BioGPS	More reference expression data
Gene ontology
Molecular function	protein binding
Cellular component	cytoplasm; nucleus
Biological process	spermatogenesis
Sources:Amigo / QuickGO
Orthologs
Databases	NCBI: entry; OMA: entry
Species	Human	Mouse
Entrez	30014	n/a
Ensembl	ENSG00000198021	n/a
UniProt	Q9NS26	n/a
RefSeq (mRNA)	NM_013453	n/a
RefSeq (protein)	NP_038481	n/a
Location (UCSC)	Chr X: 141.58 – 141.59 Mb	n/a
PubMed search		n/a
- Wikidata
View/Edit Human

Sperm protein associated with the nucleus on the X chromosome A is a protein that in humans is encoded by the SPANXA1 gene.

"Temporally regulated transcription and translation of several testis-specific genes is required to initiate the series of molecular and morphological changes in the male germ cell lineage necessary for the formation of mature spermatozoa. This gene is a member of the SPANX family of cancer/testis-associated genes, which are located in a cluster on chromosome X. The SPANX genes encode differentially expressed testis-specific proteins that localize to various subcellular compartments. This particular gene maps to chromosome X in a head-to-head orientation with SPANX family member A2, which appears to be a duplication of the A1 locus. The protein encoded by this gene targets to the nucleus where it associates with nuclear vacuoles and the redundant nuclear envelope. Based on its association with these poorly characterized regions of the sperm nucleus, this protein provides a biochemical marker to study unique structures in spermatazoa [sic] while attempting to further define its role in spermatogenesis."
