= Dystrophin-associated protein complex =

The dystrophin-associated protein complex, also known as the dystrophin-associated glycoprotein complex, is a multiprotein complex that includes dystrophin and the dystrophin-associated proteins. It is one of the two protein complexes that make up the costamere in striated muscle cells. The other complex is the integrin-vinculin-talin complex.

== Structure ==
The dystrophin-associated protein complex includes dystrophin. Dystrophin binds to actin of the cytoskeleton, and also to proteins in the extracellular matrix.

The dystrophin-associated protein complex also contains dystrophin-associated proteins. This includes a four subunit sarcoglycan complex, which is fixed to dystrophin in muscle cells.

In the epithelia of the kidney, dystrophin may be replaced with utrophin.

Aquaporin 4 may be connected to the dystrophin-associated protein complex.

== Function ==
The dystrophin-associated protein complex is important for cell structure and cell signalling. It is one of two protein complexes found in the costamere in striated muscle fibres.

== Clinical significance ==
Many forms of muscular dystrophy are associated with disorders of the dystrophin-associated protein complex.

Muscular dystrophy, the result of mutations in the genes that encode for dystrophin and the associated proteins that binds to it can arise in various forms. The most common form is known as Duchenne muscular dystrophy (DMD). DMD is usually discovered in early childhood and is most often seen occurring in males. There are several associated symptoms that can be observed in such patients including but not limited to a delay in walking and sitting, difficulty in breathing and heart failure. These symptoms are found as a result of the inability to synthesize dystrophin and associate protein complexes that leave muscles weak and unable to repair any damaged sustained. These perpetually weak muscles prohibit normal physical activity.

=== Therapy ===
There has been extensive research to discover treatment for DMD. The most common drug treated against DMD is known to be Deflazacort yielding the greatest benefits with the most acceptable side effects. Physical therapy consists of varying exercises that aim to increase muscle strength and durability so to facilitate normal physical activity and is recommended to begin as early as possible after diagnosis. Contracture intervention is recommended for patients in the middle ambulatory stage. However, surgical approach to DMD is declining as less invasive treatment becomes available. While treatment for DMD has been observed to improve muscle function and quality of life, a cure to the debilitating disease remains to be found.

== Therapeutic Microdystrophin ==
- Delandistrogene moxeparvovec - Systemic Gene Transfer with rAAVrh74.MHCK7.micro-dystrophin.
