= Syntrophin, alpha 1 =

Protein-coding gene in the species Homo sapiens

SNTA1
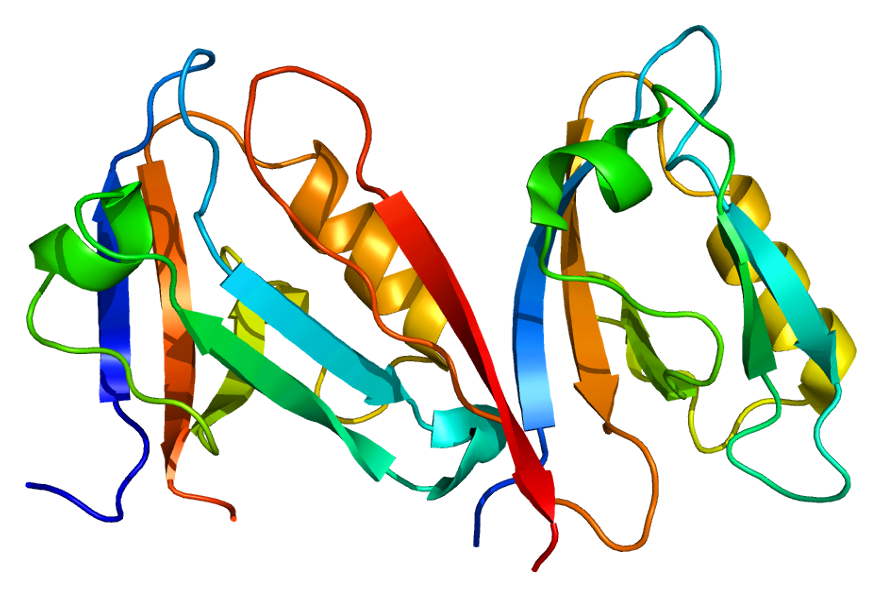

Identifiers
- Aliases: SNTA1, LQT12, SNT1, TACIP1, dJ1187J4.5, Syntrophin, alpha 1, syntrophin alpha 1
- External IDs: OMIM: 601017; MGI: 101772; GeneCards: SNTA1
Available structures
PDB	Ortholog search: PDBe RCSB
PDB	List of PDB id codes 1QAV, 1Z86, 1Z87, 2ADZ, 2PDZ, 4HOP

Gene location (Human)
Chr.	Chromosome 20 (human)
Band	20q11.21	Start	33,407,957 bp
Band	20q11.21	End	33,443,763 bp

Gene location (Mouse)
Chr.	Chromosome 2 (mouse)
Band	2 H1|2 76.52 cM	Start	154,218,233 bp
Band	2 H1|2 76.52 cM	End	154,250,019 bp
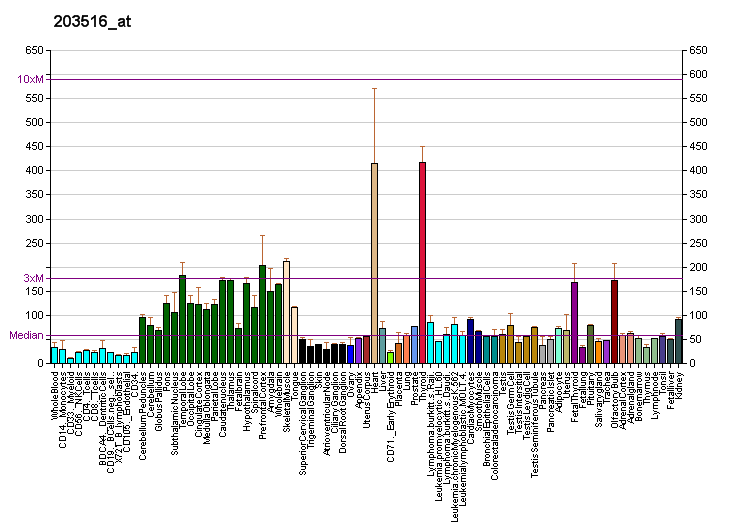
RNA expression pattern
Bgee	Human / Mouse (ortholog); Top expressed in: apex of heart; muscle of thigh; gastrocnemius muscle; right auricle of heart; left ventricle; putamen; caudate nucleus; nucleus accumbens; amygdala; right lobe of thyroid gland / Top expressed in: muscle of thigh; extensor digitorum longus muscle; triceps brachii muscle; ankle; sternocleidomastoid muscle; skeletal muscle tissue; plantaris muscle; medial head of gastrocnemius muscle; temporal muscle; choroid plexus of fourth ventricle; More reference expression data
BioGPS	More reference expression data
Gene ontology
Molecular function	sodium channel regulator activity; nitric-oxide synthase binding; transmembrane transporter binding; ATPase binding; structural molecule activity; calmodulin binding; protein binding; actin binding; PDZ domain binding
Cellular component	cytoplasm; lateral plasma membrane; membrane; neuromuscular junction; plasma membrane; intracellular anatomical structure; cell junction; sarcolemma; syntrophin complex; cytoskeleton; protein-containing complex; dystrophin-associated glycoprotein complex; synapse
Biological process	muscle contraction; negative regulation of peptidyl-cysteine S-nitrosylation; ventricular cardiac muscle cell action potential; regulation of heart rate; regulation of sodium ion transmembrane transport; regulation of ventricular cardiac muscle cell membrane repolarization
Sources:Amigo / QuickGO
Orthologs
Databases	NCBI: entry; OMA: entry
Species	Human	Mouse
Entrez	6640	20648
Ensembl	ENSG00000101400	ENSMUSG00000027488
UniProt	Q13424	Q61234
RefSeq (mRNA)	NM_003098	NM_009228
RefSeq (protein)	NP_003089	NP_033254
Location (UCSC)	Chr 20: 33.41 – 33.44 Mb	Chr 2: 154.22 – 154.25 Mb
PubMed search
- Wikidata
View/Edit Human	View/Edit Mouse

Alpha-1-syntrophin is a protein that in humans is encoded by the SNTA1 gene. Alpha-1 syntrophin is a signal transducing adaptor protein and serves as a scaffold for various signaling molecules. Alpha-1 syntrophin contains a PDZ domain, two Pleckstrin homology domain and a 'syntrophin unique' domain.

== Function ==
Dystrophin is a large, rod-like cytoskeletal protein found at the inner surface of muscle fibers. Dystrophin is missing in Duchenne Muscular Dystrophy patients and is present in reduced amounts in Becker Muscular Dystrophy patients. The protein encoded by this gene is a peripheral membrane protein found associated with dystrophin and dystrophin-related proteins. This gene is a member of the syntrophin gene family, which contains at least two other structurally related genes. The PDZ domain of syntrophin-α1(SNTA1), the most abundant isoform in the heart, has been reported to bind to the C-terminal domain of murine cardiac voltage-gated sodium channels (SkM2) causing altering ion channel activity leading to Long QT syndrome.

== Interactions ==
Syntrophin, alpha 1 has been shown to interact with Dystrophin, Nav1.1 and Nav1.5, and Aquaporin 4.
