= Collagen, type XXV, alpha 1 =

Protein found in humans

COL25A1

Identifiers
- Aliases: COL25A1, AMY, CLAC, CLAC-P, CLACP, CFEOM5, Collagen, type XXV, alpha 1, collagen type XXV alpha 1, collagen type XXV alpha 1 chain
- External IDs: OMIM: 610004; MGI: 1924268; GeneCards: COL25A1

Gene location (Human)
Chr.	Chromosome 4 (human)
Band	4q25	Start	108,808,725 bp
Band	4q25	End	109,302,752 bp

Gene location (Mouse)
Chr.	Chromosome 3 (mouse)
Band	3|3 G3	Start	129,925,150 bp
Band	3|3 G3	End	130,393,526 bp
RNA expression pattern
Bgee	Human / Mouse (ortholog); Top expressed in: sperm; left testis; right testis; jejunal mucosa; buccal mucosa cell; testicle; Achilles tendon; subcutaneous adipose tissue; anterior pituitary; sural nerve / Top expressed in: median eminence; lateral septal nucleus; medial dorsal nucleus; arcuate nucleus; substantia nigra; habenula; superior colliculus; lateral geniculate nucleus; anterior amygdaloid area; lateral hypothalamus; More reference expression data
BioGPS	n/a
Gene ontology
Molecular function	heparin binding; amyloid-beta binding; extracellular matrix structural constituent; extracellular matrix structural constituent conferring tensile strength
Cellular component	integral component of membrane; extracellular region; plasma membrane; collagen; endoplasmic reticulum lumen; membrane; extracellular space; integral component of plasma membrane; extracellular matrix; collagen-containing extracellular matrix
Biological process	axonogenesis involved in innervation; extracellular matrix organization
Sources:Amigo / QuickGO
Orthologs
Databases	NCBI: entry; OMA: entry
Species	Human	Mouse
Entrez	84570	77018
Ensembl	ENSG00000188517	ENSMUSG00000058897
UniProt	Q9BXS0	Q99MQ5
RefSeq (mRNA)	NM_001256074; NM_032518; NM_198721	NM_001244952; NM_029838; NM_198711
RefSeq (protein)	NP_001243003; NP_115907; NP_942014	NP_001231881; NP_084114; NP_942004
Location (UCSC)	Chr 4: 108.81 – 109.3 Mb	Chr 3: 129.93 – 130.39 Mb
PubMed search
- Wikidata
View/Edit Human	View/Edit Mouse

Collagen alpha-1(XXV) chain is a protein that in humans is encoded by the COL25A1 gene.

COL25A1 is a brain-specific membrane-bound collagen. Proteolytic processing releases CLAC, a soluble form of COL25A1 containing the extracellular collagen domains that associates with senile plaques in Alzheimer disease (AD; MIM 104300) brains (Osada et al., 2005).[supplied by OMIM]

== Interactions ==
Collagen, type XXV, alpha 1 has been shown to interact with Amyloid precursor protein.
