= Utrophin =

Mammalian protein found in Homo sapiens

UTRN
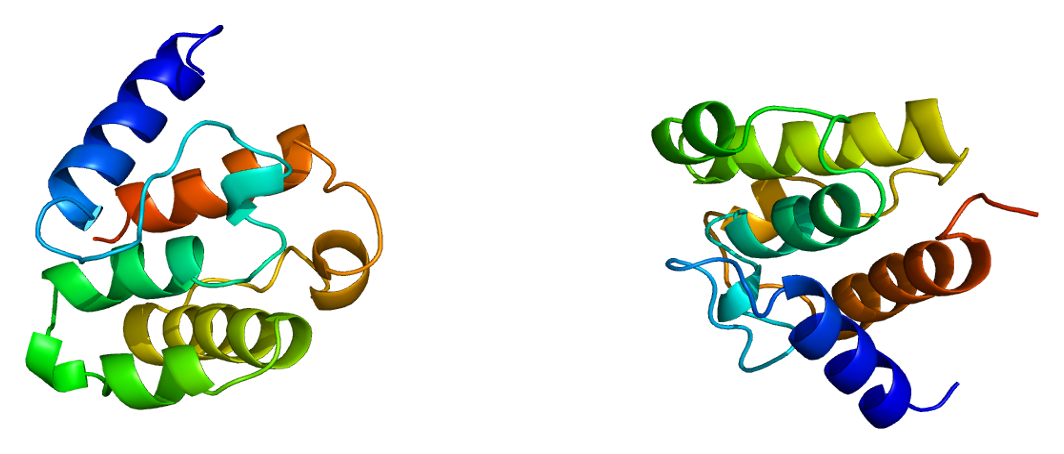

Identifiers
- Aliases: UTRN, DMDL, DRP, DRP1, utrophin
- External IDs: OMIM: 128240; MGI: 104631; GeneCards: UTRN
Available structures
PDB	Human UniProt search: PDBe RCSB
PDB	List of PDB id codes 1BHD, 1QAG,%%s1BHD, 1QAG

Gene location (Human)
Chr.	Chromosome 6 (human)
Band	6q24.2	Start	144,285,335 bp
Band	6q24.2	End	144,853,034 bp

Gene location (Mouse)
Chr.	Chromosome 10 (mouse)
Band	10 A1|10 3.77 cM	Start	12,257,932 bp
Band	10 A1|10 3.77 cM	End	12,745,109 bp
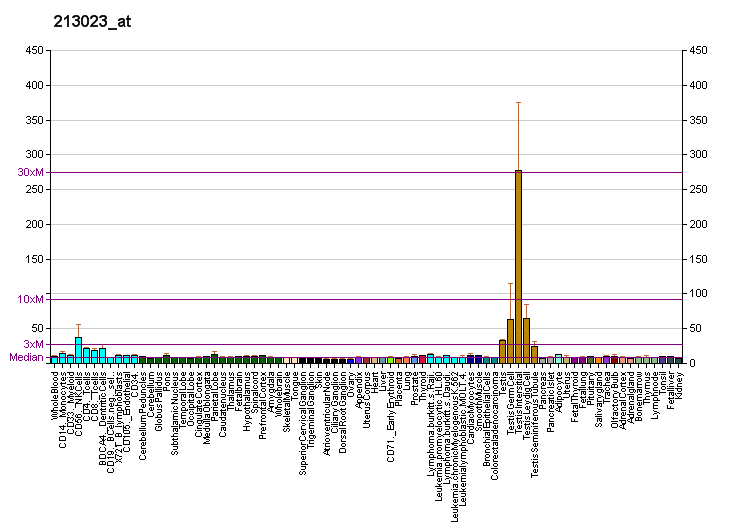

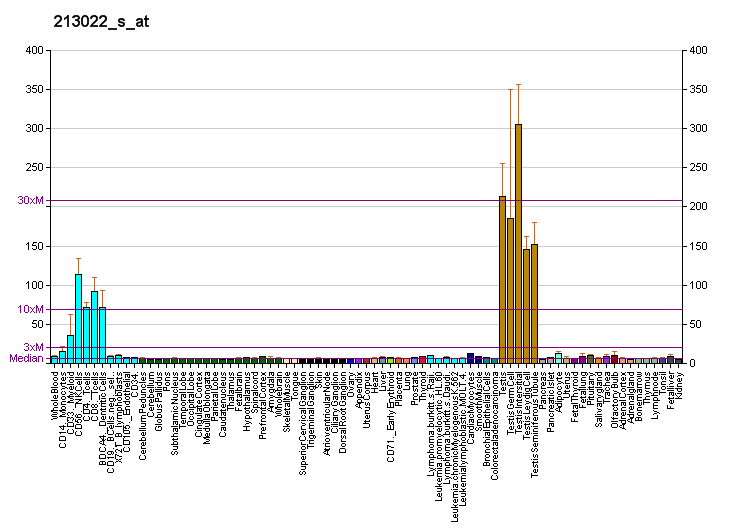
RNA expression pattern
Bgee	Human / Mouse (ortholog); Top expressed in: Achilles tendon; sural nerve; tendon of biceps brachii; trigeminal ganglion; epithelium of colon; monocyte; visceral pleura; pericardium; parietal pleura; epithelium of nasopharynx / Top expressed in: iris; ciliary body; Paneth cell; ascending aorta; aortic valve; vestibular membrane of cochlear duct; retinal pigment epithelium; fossa; right lung; right lung lobe; More reference expression data
BioGPS	More reference expression data
Gene ontology
Molecular function	vinculin binding; zinc ion binding; metal ion binding; integrin binding; actin filament binding; protein binding; actin binding; protein kinase binding
Cellular component	cytoplasm; postsynaptic membrane; contractile ring; membrane; filopodium; growth cone; neuromuscular junction; plasma membrane; synapse; dystrophin-associated glycoprotein complex; nucleoplasm; cell junction; cortical actin cytoskeleton; sarcolemma; extracellular exosome; cytoskeleton; filopodium membrane; protein-containing complex
Biological process	muscle contraction; positive regulation of cell-matrix adhesion; muscle organ development; neuromuscular junction development; regulation of sodium ion transmembrane transporter activity; response to denervation involved in regulation of muscle adaptation
Sources:Amigo / QuickGO
Orthologs
Databases	NCBI: entry; OMA: entry
Species	Human	Mouse
Entrez	7402	22288
Ensembl	ENSG00000152818	ENSMUSG00000019820
UniProt	P46939; Q5T097	n/a
RefSeq (mRNA)	NM_007124; NM_001375323	NM_011682
RefSeq (protein)	NP_009055; NP_001362252	n/a
Location (UCSC)	Chr 6: 144.29 – 144.85 Mb	Chr 10: 12.26 – 12.75 Mb
PubMed search
- Wikidata
View/Edit Human	View/Edit Mouse

Utrophin is a protein that in humans is encoded by the UTRN gene. The name is a short form for ubiquitous dystrophin. The 900 kb gene for utrophin is found on the long arm of human chromosome 6.

== Discovery ==
Utrophin was discovered due to its homology with dystrophin. It was found by screening a peptide containing the C-terminal domain of dystrophin against cDNA libraries. The homology of utrophin to dystrophin varies over its full length from less than 30% in regions of the central rod structural domain to 85% (identity 73%) for the actin binding domain.

== Tissue distribution ==
In normal muscle cells, utrophin is located at the neuromuscular synapse and myotendinous junctions. It is necessary for normal membrane maintenance, and for the clustering of the acetylcholine receptor. In adult humans, utrophin RNA is found ubiquitously, as the name implies, being abundant in the brain, kidney, liver, lung, muscle, spleen and stomach. In the human fetus during muscle differentiation, utrophin is found at the sarcolemma. It disappears when the fetus begins to express dystrophin.

== Structure ==
The tertiary structure of utrophin contains a C-terminus that consists of protein–protein interaction motifs that interact with dystroglycan, a central rod region consisting of a triple coiled-coil repeat, and an actin-binding N-terminus.

== Function ==
The protein encoded by this gene is a component of the cytoskeleton. Utrophin was found during research into Duchenne's muscular dystrophy, where boosting its production was found to prevent cellular damage from occurring.

== Clinical significance ==
Utrophin expression is dramatically increased in patients with Duchenne's muscular dystrophy (and female carriers), both in those muscle fibers lacking dystrophin and in rare, revertant fibers that express dystrophin. No reports have yet associated mutation in the utrophin gene with disease, but it does not seem to play a critical role in development, since mice without utrophin develop normally.

== See also ==
- dystrophin
