= Dystrophin =

Rod-shaped cytoplasmic protein

DMD
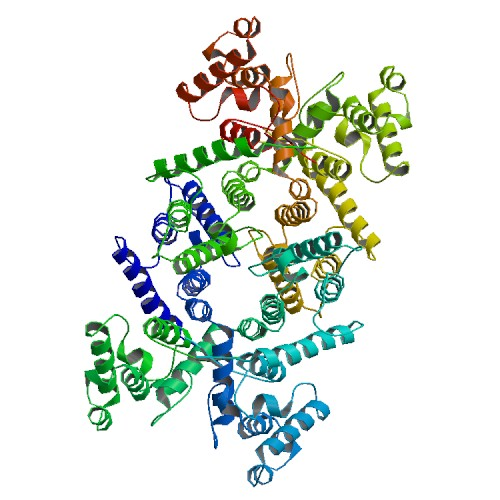

Identifiers
- Aliases: DMD, BMD, CMD3B, DXS142, DXS164, DXS206, DXS230, DXS239, DXS268, DXS269, DXS270, DXS272, MRX85, dystrophin
- External IDs: OMIM: 300377; MGI: 94909; GeneCards: DMD
Available structures
PDB	Ortholog search: PDBe RCSB
PDB	List of PDB id codes 1DXX, 1EG3, 1EG4, 3UUN

Gene location (Human)
Chr.	X chromosome (human)
Band	Xp21.2-p21.1	Start	31,097,677 bp
Band	Xp21.2-p21.1	End	33,339,609 bp

Gene location (Mouse)
Chr.	X chromosome (mouse)
Band	X C1|X 38.38 cM	Start	81,992,476 bp
Band	X C1|X 38.38 cM	End	84,249,747 bp
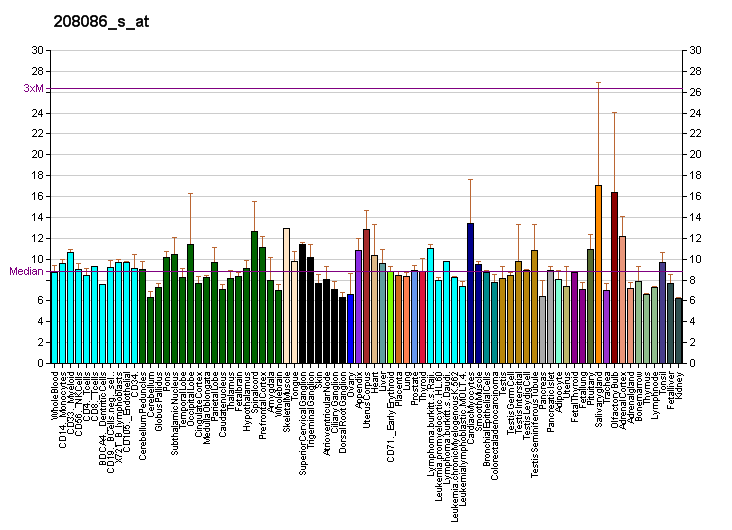

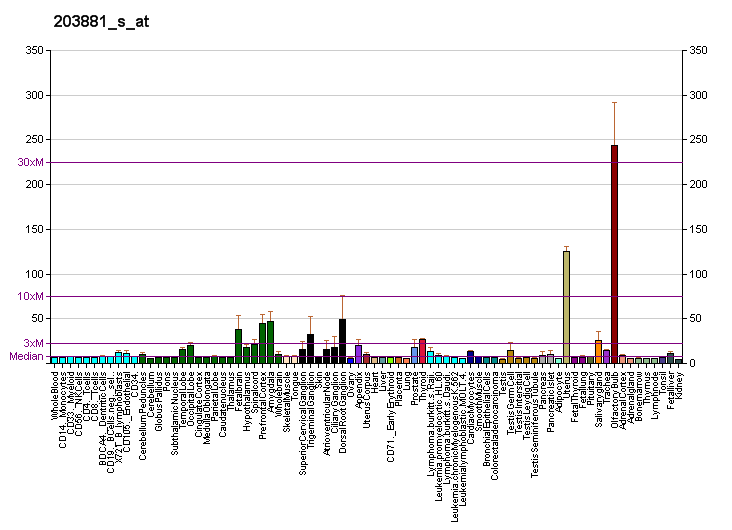
RNA expression pattern
Bgee	Human / Mouse (ortholog); Top expressed in: trigeminal ganglion; Skeletal muscle tissue of rectus abdominis; spinal ganglia; seminal vesicula; sural nerve; biceps brachii; vastus lateralis muscle; Skeletal muscle tissue of biceps brachii; endothelial cell; saphenous vein / Top expressed in: ascending aorta; pineal gland; aortic valve; temporal muscle; gastrula; tunica media of zone of aorta; sternocleidomastoid muscle; muscle of thigh; digastric muscle; triceps brachii muscle; More reference expression data
BioGPS	More reference expression data
Gene ontology
Molecular function	nitric-oxide synthase binding; dystroglycan binding; vinculin binding; myosin binding; zinc ion binding; metal ion binding; protein binding; actin binding; structural constituent of muscle; structural constituent of cytoskeleton
Cellular component	cytoplasm; cytosol; postsynaptic membrane; lateral plasma membrane; membrane; filopodium; cell-substrate junction; plasma membrane; synapse; dystrophin-associated glycoprotein complex; cell surface; cell junction; Z discdkac; actin cytoskeleton; membrane raft; sarcolemma; costamere; syntrophin complex; neuron projection terminus; cytoskeleton; nucleus; filopodium membrane; protein-containing complex
Biological process	response to muscle stretch; regulation of ryanodine-sensitive calcium-release channel activity; cardiac muscle cell action potential; regulation of voltage-gated calcium channel activity; cardiac muscle contraction; muscle cell cellular homeostasis; negative regulation of peptidyl-cysteine S-nitrosylation; regulation of cardiac muscle contraction by regulation of the release of sequestered calcium ion; peptide biosynthetic process; muscle organ development; regulation of heart rate; positive regulation of neuron differentiation; negative regulation of peptidyl-serine phosphorylation; positive regulation of neuron projection development; muscle filament sliding; positive regulation of sodium ion transmembrane transporter activity; regulation of cellular response to growth factor stimulus; regulation of release of sequestered calcium ion into cytosol by sarcoplasmic reticulum; motile cilium assembly; regulation of skeletal muscle contraction; regulation of skeletal muscle contraction by regulation of release of sequestered calcium ion; cytoskeleton organization
Sources:Amigo / QuickGO
Orthologs
Databases	NCBI: entry; OMA: entry
Species	Human	Mouse
Entrez	1756	13405
Ensembl	ENSG00000198947	ENSMUSG00000045103
UniProt	P11532	P11531
RefSeq (mRNA)	NM_000109; NM_004006; NM_004007; NM_004009; NM_004010 NM_004011; NM_004012; NM_004013; NM_004014; NM_004015; NM_004016; NM_004017; NM_004018; NM_004019; NM_004020; NM_004021; NM_004022; NM_004023	NM_007868; NM_001314034; NM_001314035; NM_001314036; NM_001314037 NM_001314038
RefSeq (protein)	NP_000100; NP_003997; NP_004000; NP_004001; NP_004002 NP_004003; NP_004004; NP_004005; NP_004006; NP_004007; NP_004008; NP_004009; NP_004010; NP_004011; NP_004012; NP_004013; NP_004014	NP_001300963; NP_001300964; NP_001300965; NP_001300966; NP_001300967 NP_031894
Location (UCSC)	Chr X: 31.1 – 33.34 Mb	Chr X: 81.99 – 84.25 Mb
PubMed search
- Wikidata
View/Edit Human	View/Edit Mouse

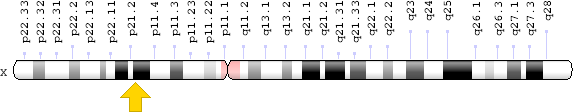
In humans, the DMD gene is located on the short (p) arm of the X chromosome between positions 21.2 and 21.1

Dystrophin is a rod-shaped cytoplasmic protein, and a vital part of a protein complex that connects the cytoskeleton of a muscle fiber to the surrounding extracellular matrix through the cell membrane. This complex is variously known as the costamere or the dystrophin-associated protein complex (DAPC). Many muscle proteins, such as α-dystrobrevin, syncoilin, synemin, sarcoglycan, dystroglycan, and sarcospan, colocalize with dystrophin at the costamere. It has a molecular weight of 427 kDa.

Dystrophin is coded for by the DMD gene – the third largest known human gene, covering 2.24 megabases (0.08% of the human genome) at locus Xp21. The primary transcript in muscle measures about 2,100 kilobases and takes 16 hours to transcribe; the mature mRNA measures 14.0 kilobases. The 79-exon muscle transcript codes for a protein of 3685 amino acid residues.

Spontaneous or inherited mutations in the dystrophin gene can cause different forms of muscular dystrophy, a disease characterized by progressive muscular wasting. The most common of these disorders caused by genetic defects in dystrophin is Duchenne muscular dystrophy.

== Function ==
Dystrophin is a protein located between the sarcolemma and the outermost layer of myofilaments in the muscle fiber (myofiber). It is a cohesive protein, linking actin filaments to other support proteins that reside on the inside surface of each muscle fiber's plasma membrane (sarcolemma). These support proteins on the inside surface of the sarcolemma in turn links to two other consecutive proteins for a total of three linking proteins. The final linking protein is attached to the fibrous endomysium of the entire muscle fiber. Dystrophin supports muscle fiber strength, and the absence of dystrophin reduces muscle stiffness, increases sarcolemmal deformability, and compromises the mechanical stability of costameres and their connections to nearby myofibrils. This has been shown in recent studies where biomechanical properties of the sarcolemma and its links through costameres to the contractile apparatus were measured, and helps to prevent muscle fiber injury. Movement of thin filaments (actin) creates a pulling force on the extracellular connective tissue that eventually becomes the tendon of the muscle. The dystrophin associated protein complex also helps scaffold various signalling and channel proteins, implicating the DAPC in regulation of signalling processes.

== Pathology ==
Dystrophin deficiency has been definitively established as one of the root causes of the general class of myopathies collectively referred to as muscular dystrophy. The deletions of one or several exons of the dystrophin DMD gene cause Duchenne and Becker muscular dystrophies. The large cytosolic protein was first identified in 1987 by Louis M. Kunkel, after concurrent works by Kunkel and Ronald Worton to characterize the mutated gene that causes Duchenne muscular dystrophy (DMD). At least nine disease-causing mutations in this gene have been discovered.

Normal skeletal muscle tissue contains only small amounts of dystrophin (about 0.002% of total muscle protein), but its absence (or abnormal expression) leads to the development of a severe and currently incurable constellation of symptoms most readily characterized by several aberrant intracellular signaling pathways that ultimately yield pronounced myofiber necrosis as well as progressive muscle weakness and fatigability. Most DMD patients become wheelchair-dependent early in life, and the gradual development of cardiac hypertrophy—a result of severe myocardial fibrosis—typically results in premature death in the first two or three decades of life. Variants (mutations) in the DMD gene that lead to the production of too little or a defective, internally shortened but partially functional dystrophin protein, result in a display of a much milder dystrophic phenotype in affected patients, resulting in the disease known as Becker's muscular dystrophy (BMD). In some cases, the patient's phenotype is such that experts may decide differently on whether a patient should be diagnosed with DMD or BMD. The theory currently most commonly used to predict whether a variant will result in a DMD or BMD phenotype, is the reading frame rule.

Though its role in airway smooth muscle is not well established, recent research indicates that dystrophin along with other subunits of dystrophin glycoprotein complex is associated with phenotype maturation.

== Research ==
A number of models are used to facilitate research on DMD gene defects. These include the mdx mouse, GRMD (golden retriever muscular dystrophy) dog, and HFMD (hypertrophic feline muscular dystrophy) cat.

The mdx mouse contains a nonsense mutation in exon 23, leading to a shortened dystrophin protein. Levels of dystrophin in this model is not zero: a variety of mutation alleles exist with measurable levels certain of dystrophin isoforms. Muscle degeneration pathology is most easily visible in the diaphragm. Generally, clinically relevant pathology is observed with older mdx mice.

The GRMD dog is one of several existing dystrophin-deficient dogs identified where substantial characterization has been performed. Clinically relevant pathology can be observed at 8 weeks after birth, with continued gradual deterioration of muscle function. Muscle histology is most analogous to clinical presentation of DMD in humans with necrosis, fibrosis and regeneration.

The HFMD cat has a deletion in the promoter region of the DMD gene. Muscle histology shows necrosis but no fibrosis. Extensive hypertrophy has been observed which is thought to be responsible for shorter lifespans. Due to the hypertrophy, this model may have limited uses for DMD studies.

== Therapeutic microdystrophin ==
- Delandistrogene moxeparvovec - systemic gene transfer with rAAVrh74.MHCK7.micro-dystrophin.

== Interactions ==
Dystrophin has been shown to interact with:

- DTNA,
- SNTA1, and
- SNTB1.

== Neanderthal admixture ==
A variant of the DMD gene, which is on the X chromosome, named B006, appears to be an introgression from a Neanderthal-modern human mating.
