= Alan R. Battersby =

English organic chemist (1925–2018)

Sir Alan Battersby FRS
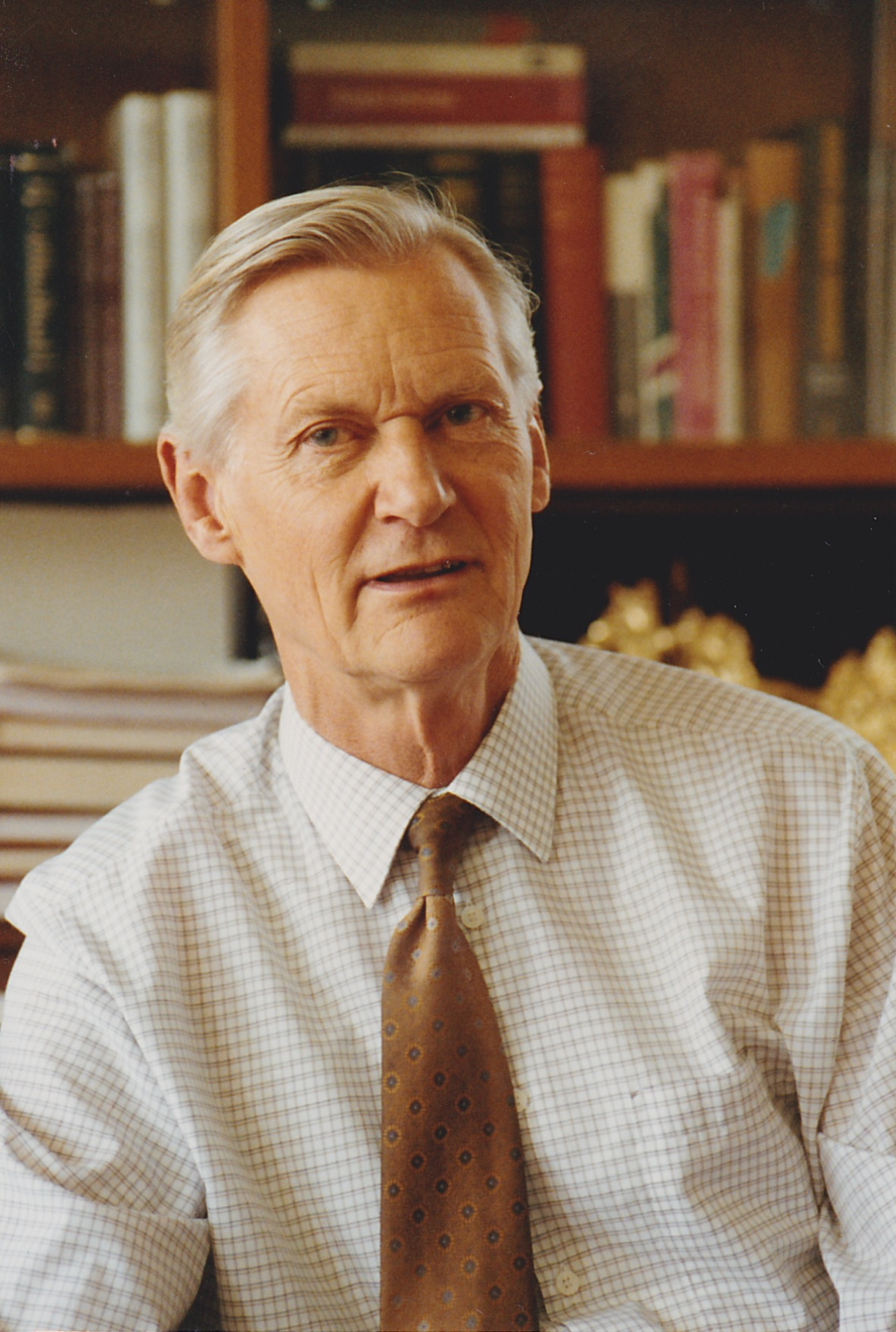
- Battersby in his office
- Born: Alan Rushton Battersby; 4 March 1925; Leigh, Lancashire, England
- Died: 10 February 2018 (aged 92)
- Education: University of Manchester; University of St Andrews
- Spouse: Margaret Ruth née Hart
- Parents: William Battersby (father); Hilda Rushton (mother)
- Awards: Davy Medal (1977); Paul Karrer Gold Medal (1977); Royal Medal (1984); Wolf Prize in Chemistry (1989); Tetrahedron Prize (1995); Copley Medal (2000)
- Scientific career
- Fields: Organic Chemistry; Natural Products
- Workplaces: University of St Andrews; Rockefeller University; University of Illinois; University of Bristol; University of Liverpool; Cambridge University
- Thesis: Researches into the structure of Emetine (1949)
- Doctoral advisor: Dr Hal T Openshaw
- Doctoral students: Andrew D. Hamilton; Craig Hawker

Sir Alan Rushton Battersby (4 March 1925 – 10 February 2018) was an English organic chemist best known for his work to define the chemical intermediates in the biosynthetic pathway to vitamin B_{12} and the reaction mechanisms of the enzymes involved. His research group was also notable for its synthesis of radiolabelled precursors to study alkaloid biosynthesis and the stereochemistry of enzymic reactions. He won numerous awards including the Royal Medal in 1984 and the Copley Medal in 2000. He was knighted in the 1992 New Year Honours. Battersby died in February 2018 at the age of 92.

== Early life and education ==
Alan Battersby was born in Leigh, Lancashire, on 4 March 1925, one of three children of William Battersby, a master plumber, and his wife Hilda née Rushton. At the age of 11 he entered Leigh Grammar School, where his chemistry teacher, Mr Evans, nurtured and encouraged him. He would have continued his schooling into the sixth form but for the fact that by age sixteen the Second World War was underway and he decided that he should join the war effort by working for BICC in their local factory. He soon concluded that this decision had been a mistake and so used his spare time to study independently at Salford Technical College for the Higher School Certificate that would be required to enter university. In October 1943, Battersby took up his place at the University of Manchester's Chemistry Department, having won a scholarship to support his undergraduate studies. He graduated with first class honours in 1946 and that year obtained a Mercer Chemistry Research Scholarship (named in honour of John Mercer) and a DSIR grant. These awards allowed him to complete an MSc (Manchester) in 1947 under the supervision of Dr Hal T Openshaw. When Openshaw was appointed as a Reader at the University of St Andrews, they both moved there and Battersby completed his PhD, which was awarded in 1949. He was immediately appointed an assistant lecturer at St Andrews. This first appointment extended from 1949 to 1953 but was interrupted by two years owing to a Commonwealth Fund Fellowship he obtained for post-doctoral study in the United States. The first year was spent with Lyman C. Craig at the Rockefeller Institute for Medical Research, New York, working on the peptide antibiotics tyrocidine and gramicidin S. The second year involved a move to the biochemistry department of the University of Illinois, working with Herbert Carter on pyruvate oxidation factor. (Note: Reference is, in effect, Sir Alan Battersby's autobiography. Initially drafted in 2002 for a departmental symposium, it provides a candid account of his scientific journey from childhood to old age. The expanded book chapter published in 2005 was "written for the non-specialist audience" and includes many insights into the choices and decisions he made, for example to switch from alkaloid chemistry to the "pigments of life".)

== Later career ==
In 1954, Battersby was appointed a lecturer at the University of Bristol, where he stayed until 1962. This was the period when his own research group of doctoral and post-doctoral students became established. In 1962 he was appointed as a professor of chemistry at Liverpool University until, in 1969, he moved to a professorship at the University of Cambridge and became a Fellow of St Catharine's College. At the time, this was the second Chair of Organic Chemistry at the university, created especially for him; Lord Todd then held the first. In 1988, Professor Battersby was elected to the prestigious 1702 Chair of Chemistry in his department and held that post until his retirement in 1992 when he was granted emeritus status within his college and department, reflecting his distinguished service.

== Research ==
The full output of Battersby's work has been published in over 350, mainly peer-reviewed, articles. His research, particularly at Cambridge, took a very collaborative approach which was necessary given the extended time period of the ambitious projects undertaken. Aside from his postgraduate and post-doctoral students, who participated typically for one to three years, the Battersby group included other members of the academic staff of the department, notably Jim Staunton, Ted McDonald and Finian Leeper. The group was funded by external grants, including those from the SERC, the EPSRC, the Leverhulme Trust, Hoffman-La Roche, the Wolfson Foundation and Zeneca.

=== Alkaloids ===
Alkaloids are a group of naturally occurring chemical compounds that mostly contain basic nitrogen atoms. They have a wide range of pharmacological activities which has made them of considerable interest to researchers. Prior to the 1950s, experimentation, often involving chemical degradation and partial or complete synthesis of possible structures, was necessary to determine their chemical identity which, owing to their stereochemistry, was often difficult to fully describe. This, for example, was the case for emetine, used for the treatment of amoebic infections and the subject of Battersby's PhD thesis. As he later commented

"Roughly 100 g of emetine had been consumed in this work; modern tools would allow the structure of emetine to be determined in three days at most using about 10 mg of recoverable material (365 times faster using 10,000 times less material)."

These tools are the now-familiar mass spectrometry, multi-atom nuclear magnetic resonance spectroscopy and X-ray crystallography: when applied to alkaloids these allowed relationships in structural sub-types to be clarified. This meant that attention could switch to an understanding of the biosynthetic pathways by which these materials are produced in the bacteria, fungi, plants and animals in which they are found. In 1937, Sonderhoff and Thomas showed how deuterium-labelled acetate could be used to investigate the biosynthesis of fats and steroids; by 1950 ^{13}C and ^{14}C labelled acetate had been incorporated into cholesterol. Battersby realised that these techniques could be used to study alkaloid biosynthesis and that it was timely to do so because simple one-carbon precursors had become commercially available. By using radiolabelled starting materials incorporating tritium or, especially, ^{14}C to follow intermediates on the pathway, he determined the sequence in which the multiple alkaloids found together in a given organism were formed. For example, the biosynthesis of morphine was shown to proceed from L-tyrosine via reticuline, salutaridine, thebaine, codeinone and codeine. The Battersby group worked on many other alkaloids, for example colchicine, (from the autumn crocus Colchicum autumnale) which is used to treat gout. This was shown to be derived from the amino acids phenylalanine and tyrosine via (S)-autumnaline. Similarly, the biosynthesis of the indole alkaloids ajmalicine, corynantheal, catharanthine and vindoline was shown to involve the precursors tryptamine and loganin. To Alan Battersby's surprise, quinine, the anti-malarial drug was shown to derive from corynantheal, although it does not share its indole substructure.

=== Biosynthesis of the "Pigments of Life" ===
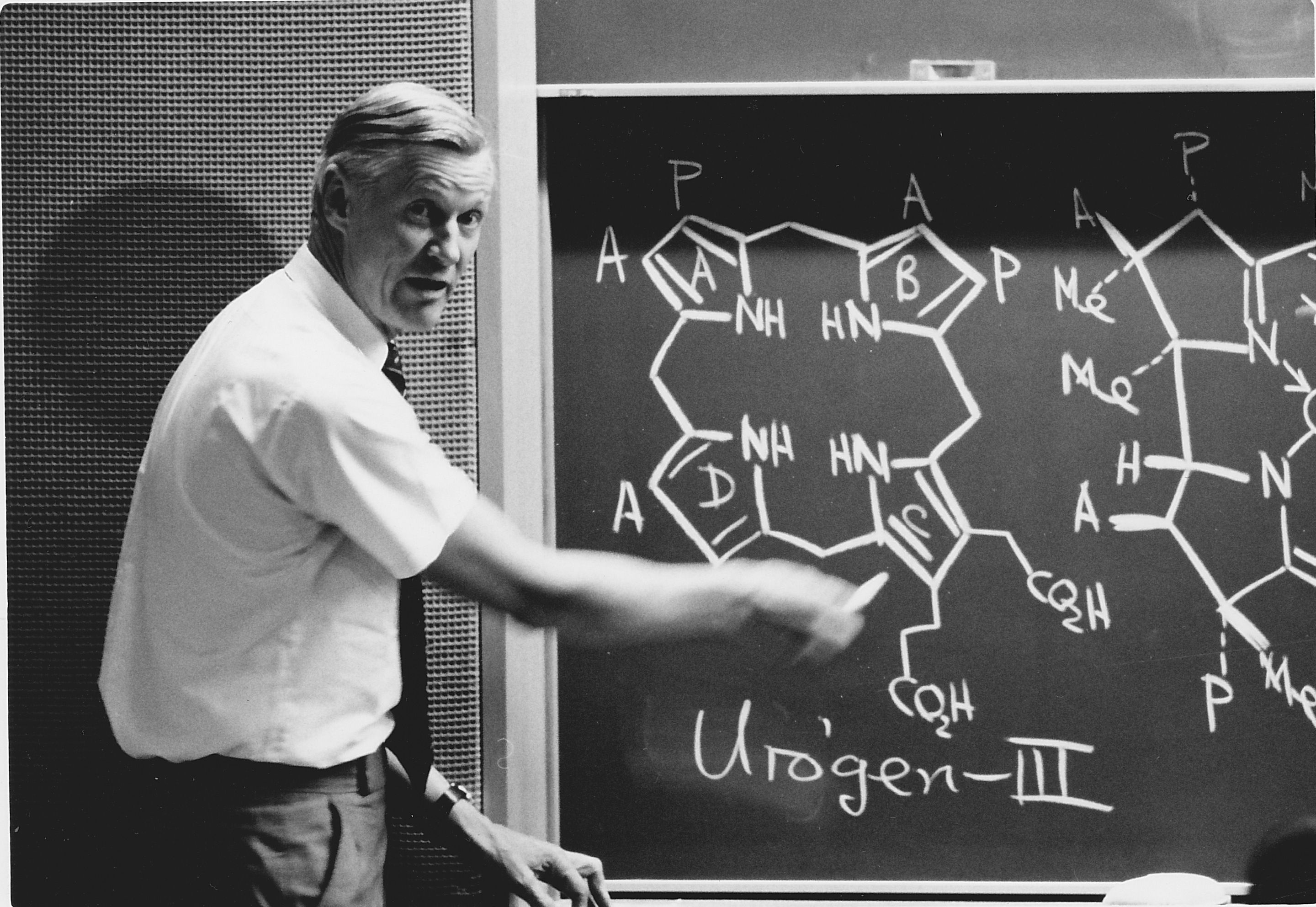
Prof Alan Battersby lecturing on porphyrin biosynthesis.

Battersby is, above all, known for his research on the biosynthesis of the "pigments of life" that are built on closely related tetrapyrrolic structural frameworks. His research group elucidated, in particular, the essential role played by two enzymes, deaminase and cosynthetase, in the steps from aminolevulinic acid via porphobilinogen and hydroxymethylbilane to uroporphyrinogen III. The latter is the first macrocyclic intermediate in the biosynthesis of haem, chlorophyll, vitamin B_{12} (cobalamin), sirohaem and cofactor F430. The work involved the careful study of labelled intermediates, using deuterium, tritium, ^{13}C and ^{14}C placed into potential precursors made by organic or enzyme-assisted synthesis. The most successful strategy was to incorporate the stable isotope ^{13}C into potential substrates, since the outcome of the biochemical reactions (for example giving uroporphyrinogen III) could readily be followed using high-field ^{13}C NMR. The Battersby group's use of doubly-^{13}C-labelled porphobilinogen was especially revealing of the rearrangement step which had puzzled those who wished to understand the details of the biosynthesis of uroporphyrinogen III. Based on these results, Battersby suggested that a spiro-pyrrolenine intermediate was generated at the active site of cosynthetase and to prove this mechanism his group designed and synthesised a spiro-lactam analogue which was indeed shown to inhibit the enzyme.

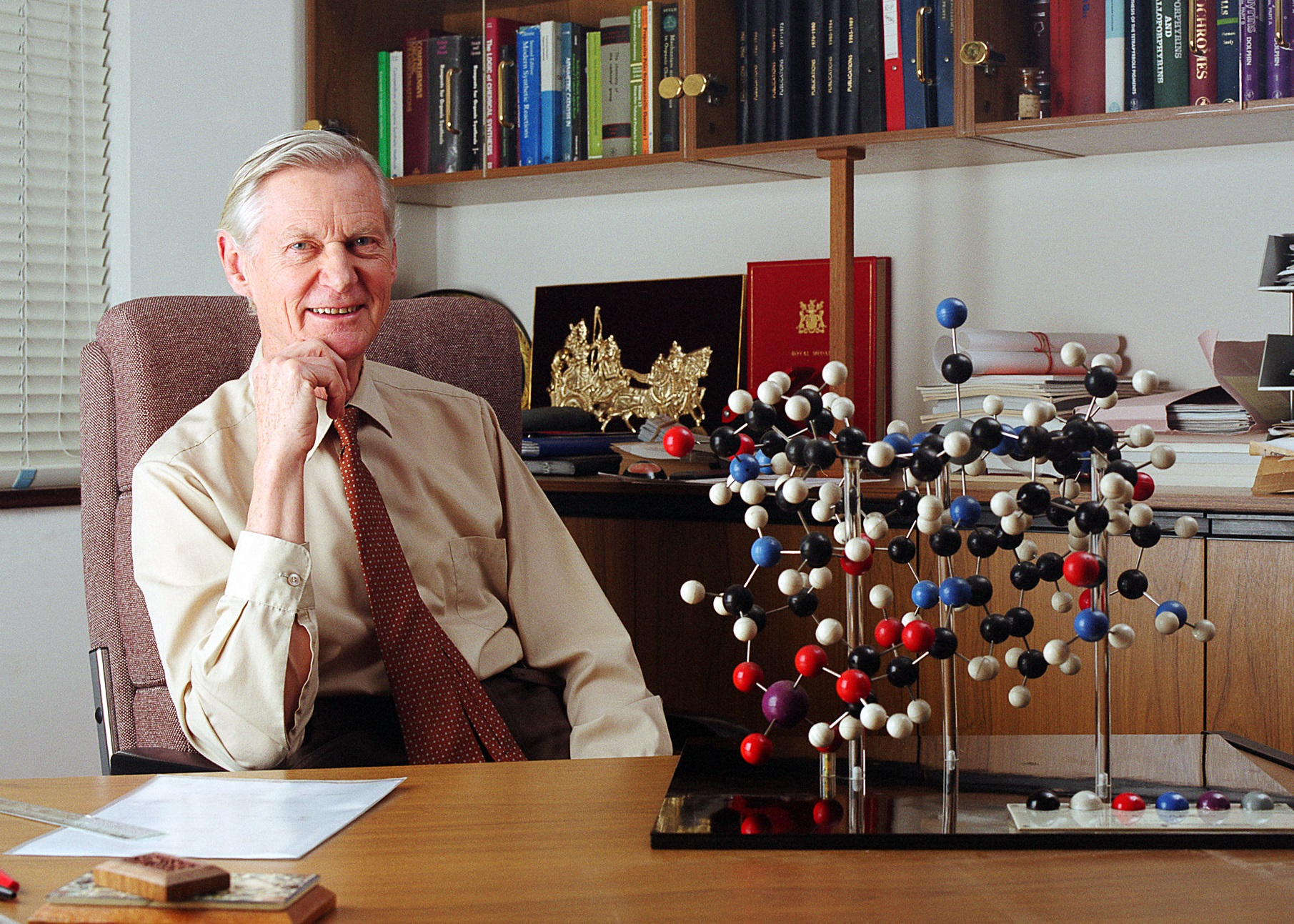
Prof Alan Battersby in his office in the Cambridge department.

Later steps towards vitamin B_{12}, especially the incorporation of the additional methyl groups of its structure, were investigated using methyl-labelled S-adenosyl methionine. It was not until a genetically engineered strain of Pseudomonas denitrificans was used, in which eight of the genes involved in the biosynthesis of cobalamin had been overexpressed, that the complete sequence of methylation and other steps could be determined thus fully establishing all the intermediates in the pathway. As Battersby wrote in his review article in Accounts of Chemical Research

"One can get some appreciation of the massive effort that was involved by the groups of Arigoni, Battersby, Francis Blanche, Vladimir Bykhovski, Joel Crouzet, Gerhard Muller and A. Ian Scott; K. Bernhauer and David Shemin also made some early contributions."

=== Haem natural products and mimics ===
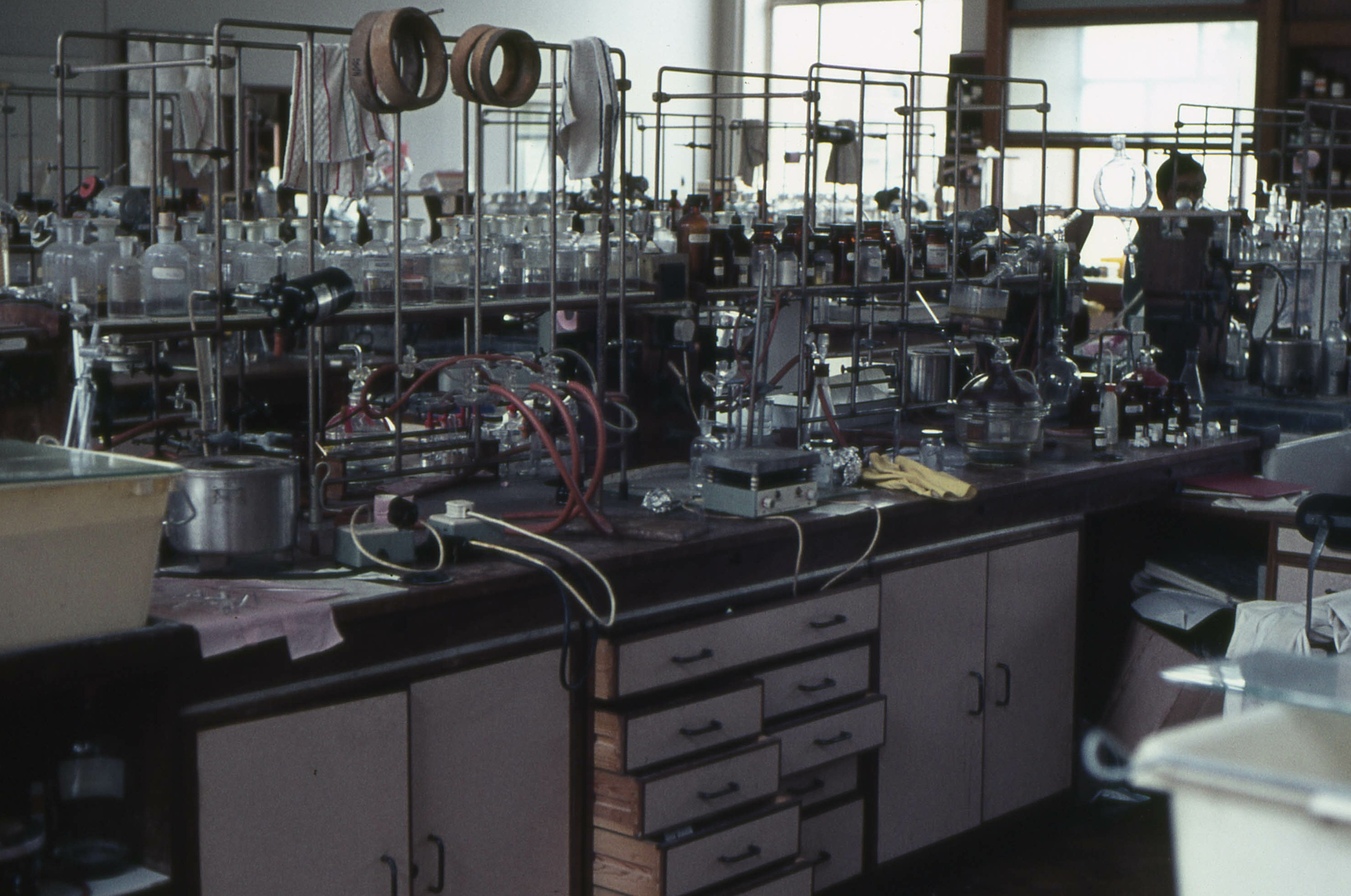
This is a typical laboratory bench used by a PhD student in the Battersby group in 1976. It was located in Lab 122 of the chemistry department.

The Battersby group's work on the biosynthesis of haem-related natural products involved considerable organic synthesis. For example, they produced fully synthetic haem a, haem d1 and sirohydrochlorin. Another challenge requiring pure synthesis was to investigate the function of the enzymes that contained porphyrin-related ligands, or (in the case of haemoglobin) used haem for oxygen-transport, by mimicking these properties without recourse to the protein that in nature surrounds the active site. Battersby chose to investigate mimics for myoglobin and cytochrome P450, designing artificial targets wherein a single metal-containing coordination complex was synthesised and its behaviour compared with the natural system it was replacing. The small-molecule targets were porphyrins carrying substituents in positions where they would be unlikely to interfere with the electronic properties of the metal complex. By the time that he retired in 1992, this area of chemistry had become very active.

=== Stereochemistry of enzymic reactions ===
The work described above is a subset of a broader field which attempts to understand the stereochemistry and mechanism of enzyme catalysis. The Battersby group used their expertise in the use of tritium-labelled substrates to probe a number of enzyme systems, for example histidine decarboxylase and tyrosine decarboxylase.

== Personal life ==
Battersby married Margaret Ruth née Hart in 1949. She was a botanist by profession who died of cancer in 1997. They had two sons, Martin and Stephen, four grandchildren and, after Margaret died, Alan acquired three great-grandchildren. In retirement, he enjoyed hiking and fly-fishing but he also kept in touch with his many colleagues and former students.

== Honours and awards ==
Battersby received Honorary Doctorates from his alma mater the University of St Andrews, in 1977, Rockefeller University, the University of Sheffield in 1986, Heriot-Watt University in 1987, Bristol University in 1994 and Liverpool University in 1994. In 1988, he was elected a Foreign Honorary Member of the American Academy of Arts and Sciences, and a Foreign Fellow of the National Academy of Sciences of India in 1990. He was awarded the Wolf Prize in Chemistry along with Duilio Arigoni of ETH Zurich in 1989 for "their fundamental contributions to the elucidation of the mechanism of enzymic reactions and of the biosynthesis of natural products, in particular the pigments of life".

- Corday Morgan Medal (1959)
- Tilden Medal (1963)
- Elected a Fellow of the Royal Society (FRS) in 1966
- Hugo Müller Lectureship (1972)
- Flintoff Medal (1975)
- Davy Medal (1977)
- Paul Karrer Gold Medal (1977)
- Max Tishler Prize (1978)
- Natural Product Chemistry Award (1979)
- Pedler Award (1980)
- Roger Adams Award (1983)
- Havinga Medal (1984)
- Longstaff Prize (1984)
- Royal Medal (1984)
- Bakerian Lectureship (1984)
- Robert Robinson Award (1986)
- Antonio Feltrinelli International Prize for Chemistry (1986)
- Varro E. Tyler Distinguished Lectureship (1987)
- Wolf Prize in Chemistry (1989)
- Arun Guthikonda Memorial Lectureship, Columbia University (1991)
- Knight Bachelor (1992)
- August Wilhelm von Hofmann Prize (1992)
- Ivan Levinstein Memorial Lectureship (1992)
- Tetrahedron Prize (1995)
- Hans-Herloff Inhoffen Medal (1997)
- Welch Award in Chemistry (2000)
- Copley Medal (2000)
- R. B. Woodward Award (2004)

The Award of the Copley Medal of the Royal Society was made:

In recognition of his pioneering work in elucidating the detailed biosynthetic pathways to all the major families of plant alkaloids. His approach, which stands as a paradigm for future biosynthetic studies on complex molecules, combines isolation work, structure determination, synthesis, isotopic labelling and spectroscopy, especially advanced NMR, as well as genetics and molecular biology. This spectacular research revealed the entire pathway to vitamin B12.
