= Uroporphyrinogen =

Uroporphyrinogens are cyclic tetrapyrroles with four propionic acid groups ("P" groups) and four acetic acid groups ("A" groups).

There are four forms, which vary based upon the arrangements of the "P" and "A" groups (in clockwise order):

- In the "I" variety (i.e. uroporphyrinogen I), the order repeats four times: AP-AP-AP-AP.
- In the "III" variety (i.e. uroporphyrinogen III), the fourth is reversed: AP-AP-AP-PA.
  This is the most common form. In the synthesis of porphyrin, it is created from the linear tetrapyrrole hydroxymethylbilane by the enzyme uroporphyrinogen III synthase, and is further converted into coproporphyrinogen III by the enzyme uroporphyrinogen III decarboxylase.
- The "II" and "IV" varieties can be created synthetically, but do not appear in nature.
