= Bilane =

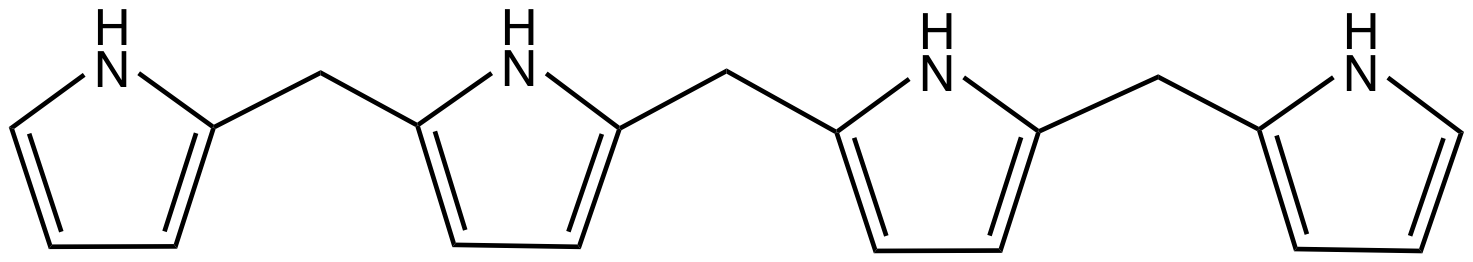

Names
- IUPAC name 5,10,15,22,23,24-Hexahydro-21H-biline
- Systematic IUPAC name 1^{1}H,3^{1}H,5^{1}H,7^{1}H-1,7(2),3,5(2,5)-Tetrapyrrolaheptaphane
- Other names Bilinogen; Tetrapyrrolotrismethane

Identifiers
CAS Number	68277-11-2
3D model (JSmol)	Interactive image
Beilstein Reference	8008279
ChEBI	CHEBI:36305
ChemSpider	7827700
PubChem CID	9548777
UNII	NH2W46YV49
CompTox Dashboard (EPA)	DTXSID401336226
- InChI: InChI=1S/C19H20N4/c1-3-14(20-9-1)11-16-5-7-18(22-16)13-19-8-6-17(23-19)12-15-4-2-10-21-15/h1-10,20-23H,11-13H2 Key: AXMKEYXDFDKKIO-UHFFFAOYSA-N
- SMILES: C1=CNC(=C1)CC2=CC=C(N2)CC3=CC=C(N3)CC4=CC=CN4

Properties
Chemical formula	C_{19}H_{20}N_{4}
Molar mass	304.397 g·mol^{−1}
- Except where otherwise noted, data are given for materials in their standard state (at 25 °C [77 °F], 100 kPa). Infobox references

In organic chemistry, bilane is a compound with the formula C_{19}H_{20}N_{4} or [(C_{4}H_{4}N)−CH_{2}−(C_{4}H_{3}N)−]_{2}CH_{2}. It is a tetrapyrrole, a class of compounds with four independent pyrrole rings. Specifically, the molecule can be described as four pyrrole molecules C_{4}H_{5}N connected in an open chain by three methylene bridges −CH_{2}− at carbons adjacent to the nitrogens, replacing the respective hydrogens.

The name is also used for the class of compounds formally derived from bilane proper by replacement of some additional hydrogen atoms by various functional groups. Natural bilanes usually have side chains substituted on the two carbons in each pyrrole ring that are not adjacent to the nitrogens. Artificial bilanes may be substituted on the bridging carbons (called meso positions).

The parent (unsubstituted) bilane is difficult to prepare and unstable, but substituted derivatives are synthesized by most living organisms as intermediates in the synthesis of natural porphyrins. Substituted bilanes may also be the starting point for the synthesis of artificial porphyrins.

== Reactions ==
Upon treatment with aldehydes, bilanes may cyclize to give porphyrinogens and various open or closed oligomers and polymers.

In living organisms, the biosynthesis of all natural porphyrins proceeds through the bilane, hydroxymethylbilane, which is produced from four molecules of the monomer porphobilinogen, and then converted to the closed tetrapyrrole uroporphyrinogen III (or, in certain metabolic disorders, into uroporphyrinogen I).

4
porphobilinogen
H_{2}O
4 NH_{3}
hydroxymethylbilane
H_{2}O
uroporphyrinogen III

Also, the catabolism of hemoglobin in humans produces bilirubin, another linear tetrapyrrole that is a partially oxidized bilane.
