= C40H44N4O16 =

The molecular formula C_{40}H_{44}N_{4}O_{16} (molar mass: 836.79 g/mol, exact mass: 836.275231 u) may refer to:

- Uroporphyrinogen I
- Uroporphyrinogen III
