= Coproporphyrinogen I =

Names
- IUPAC name 3-[7,12,17-tris(2-carboxyethyl)-3,8,13,18-tetramethyl-5,10,15,20,21,22, 23,24-octahydroporphyrin-2-yl]propanoic acid

Identifiers
CAS Number	31110-56-2
3D model (JSmol)	Interactive image
ChemSpider	389645
PubChem CID	440776
CompTox Dashboard (EPA)	DTXSID60331524
- InChI: InChI=1/C36H44N4O8/c1-17-21(5-9-33(41)42)29-14-26-19(3)23(7-11-35(45)46)31(39-26)16-28-20(4)24(8-12-36(47)48)32(40-28)15-27-18(2)22(6-10-34(43)44)30(38-27)13-25(17)37-29/h37-40H,5-16H2,1-4H3,(H,41,42)(H,43,44)(H,45,46)(H,47,48) Key: WIUGGJKHYQIGNH-UHFFFAOYAR
- SMILES: O=C(O)CCc1c(c5[nH]c1Cc2[nH]c(c(c2C)CCC(=O)O)Cc3c(c(c([nH]3)Cc4c(c(c([nH]4)C5)CCC(=O)O)C)CCC(=O)O)C)C

Properties
Chemical formula	C_{36}H_{44}N_{4}O_{8}
Molar mass	660.757 g/mol
- Except where otherwise noted, data are given for materials in their standard state (at 25 °C [77 °F], 100 kPa). Infobox references

Coproporphyrinogen I is an isomer of coproporphyrinogen III, a metabolic intermediate in the normal biosynthesis of heme. The compound is not normally produced by the human body; its production and accumulation causes a type of porphyria.

The difference between coproporphyrinogen I and III is the arrangements of the four carboxyethyl ("P" groups) and the four methyl groups ("M" groups). The I isomer has the sequence MP-MP-MP-MP, whereas in the III isomer it is MP-MP-MP-PM, with the last two side chains reversed.

== Biosynthesys ==
Coproporphyrinogen I is not produced in the normal porphyrin biosynthesis pathway. However, if the enzyme uroporphyrinogen-III cosynthase is missing or inactive, the compound uroporphyrinogen I is produced instead of uroporphyrinogen III. The enzyme uroporphyrinogen III decarboxylase will also act on the I isomer, producing coproporphyrinogen I:

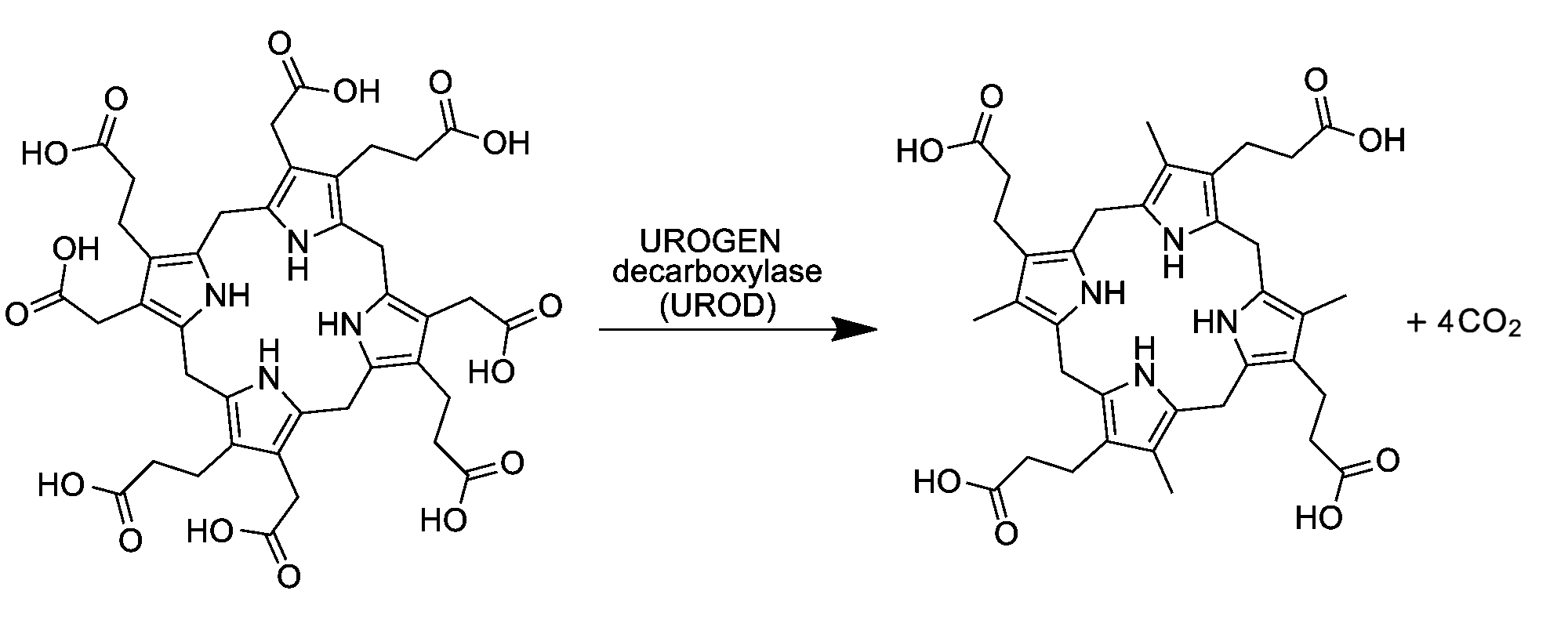

The reaction entails the conversion of the four carboxymethyl (acetic acid) side chains to methyl groups, with release of four molecules of carbon dioxide.

Unlike the III isomer, coproporphyrinogen I (which is cytotoxic) is not further processed by the body, and accumulates. This situation occurs in the pathological condition called congenital erythropoietic porphyria.
