= HMBS =

HMBS may refer to:

- a number of variants of the ship prefix His Majesty's Ship
- Porphobilinogen deaminase, encoded by the HMBS gene
