= Uroporphyrinogen I =

Names
- IUPAC name 3,3′,3′′,3′′′-[3,8,13,18-Tetrakis(carboxymethyl)-10,15,20,22,23,24-hexahydro-5H,21H-porphyrin-2,7,12,17-tetrayl]tetrapropanoic acid
- Systematic IUPAC name 3,3′,3′′,3′′′-[1^{4},3^{3},5^{3},7^{3}-Tetrakis(carboxymethyl)-1^{1}H,3^{1}H,5^{1}H,7^{1}H-1,3,5,7(2,5)-tetrapyrrolacyclooctaphane-1^{3},3^{4},5^{4},7^{4}-tetrayl]tetrapropanoic acid

Identifiers
CAS Number	1867-62-5
3D model (JSmol)	Interactive image
ChemSpider	389644
PubChem CID	440775
CompTox Dashboard (EPA)	DTXSID401046768
- InChI: InChI=1S/C40H44N4O16/c45-33(46)5-1-17-21(9-37(53)54)29-14-26-19(3-7-35(49)50)23(11-39(57)58)31(43-26)16-28-20(4-8-36(51)52)24(12-40(59)60)32(44-28)15-27-18(2-6-34(47)48)22(10-38(55)56)30(42-27)13-25(17)41-29/h41-44H,1-16H2,(H,45,46)(H,47,48)(H,49,50)(H,51,52)(H,53,54)(H,55,56)(H,57,58)(H,59,60) Key: QTTNOSKSLATGQB-UHFFFAOYSA-N; InChI=1/C40H44N4O16/c45-33(46)5-1-17-21(9-37(53)54)29-14-26-19(3-7-35(49)50)23(11-39(57)58)31(43-26)16-28-20(4-8-36(51)52)24(12-40(59)60)32(44-28)15-27-18(2-6-34(47)48)22(10-38(55)56)30(42-27)13-25(17)41-29/h41-44H,1-16H2,(H,45,46)(H,47,48)(H,49,50)(H,51,52)(H,53,54)(H,55,56)(H,57,58)(H,59,60) Key: QTTNOSKSLATGQB-UHFFFAOYAX
- SMILES: O=C(O)CCc1c(c5[nH]c1Cc2[nH]c(c(c2CC(=O)O)CCC(=O)O)Cc3c(c(c([nH]3)Cc4c(c(c([nH]4)C5)CCC(=O)O)CC(=O)O)CCC(=O)O)CC(=O)O)CC(=O)O

Properties
Chemical formula	C_{40}H_{44}N_{4}O_{16}
Molar mass	836.804 g·mol^{−1}
- Except where otherwise noted, data are given for materials in their standard state (at 25 °C [77 °F], 100 kPa). verify (what is ?) Infobox references

Uroporphyrinogen I is an isomer of uroporphyrinogen III, a metabolic intermediate in the biosynthesis of heme. A type of porphyria is caused by production of uroporphyrinogen I instead of III.

== Biosynthesis and metabolism ==
In living organisms, uroporphyrinogen I occurs as a side branch of the main porphyrin synthesis pathway. In the normal pathway, the linear tetrapyrrole precursor preuroporphyrinogen (a substituted hydroxymethylbilane) is converted by the enzyme uroporphyrinogen-III cosynthase into the cyclic uroporphyrinogen III; which is then converted to coproporphyrinogen III on the way to porphyrins like heme. Uroporphyrinogen I is instead produced spontaneously from preuroporphyrinogen when the enzyme is not present.

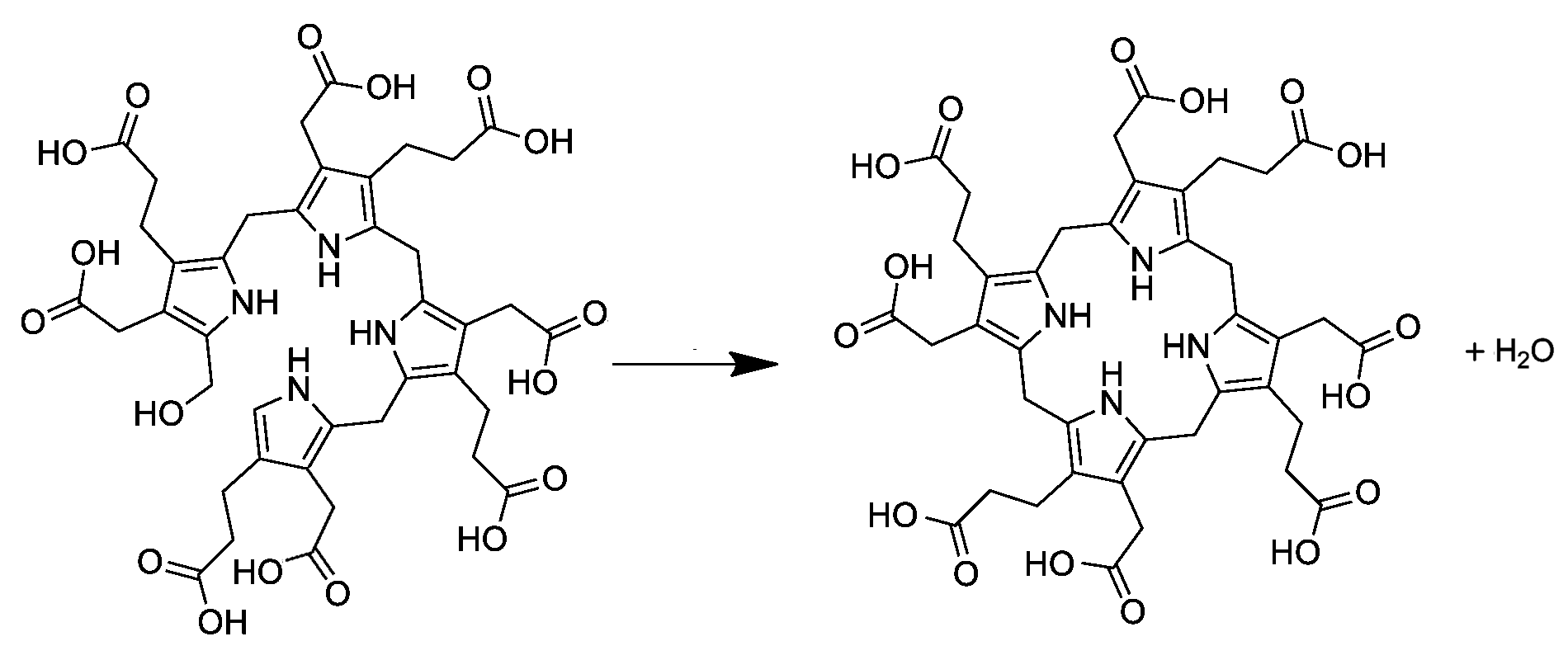
Uroporphyrinogen I synthesis from preuroporphyrinogen

The difference between the I and III forms is the arrangement of the four carboxyethyl groups (propionic acid, "P") and the four carboxymethyl groups (acetic acid, "A"). The non-enzymatic conversion to uroporphyrinogen I results in the sequence AP-AP-AP-AP, whereas the enzymatic conversion into uroporphyrinogen III leads to reversal of one AP-group and hence an AP-AP-AP-PA arrangement.

If synthesized, uroporphyrinogen I is then converted into coproporphyrinogen I by the same enzyme (uroporphyrinogen decarboxylase) that acts on the III form; but that product, which is cytotoxic, then accumulates causing the pathology congenital erythropoietic porphyria.
