= C36H44N4O8 =

The molecular formula C_{36}H_{44}N_{4}O_{8} (molar mass: 660.75 g/mol, exact mass: 660.315914 u) may refer to:

- Coproporphyrinogen I
- Coproporphyrinogen III
