= Corrole =

Aromatic tetrapyrrole

Cobalamin structure includes a deprotonated corrin macrocycle.

A corrole is an aromatic tetrapyrrole. The corrin ring is also present in cobalamin (vitamin B_{12}). The ring consists of nineteen carbon atoms, with four nitrogen atoms in the core of the molecule. In this sense, corrole is very similar to porphyrin.

== Preparation ==
Corroles can be prepared by a two-step process, beginning with the condensation reaction of a benzaldehyde with pyrrole. The open-ring product, a bilane (or tetrapyrrane), is cyclized by oxidation, typically with p-chloranil:

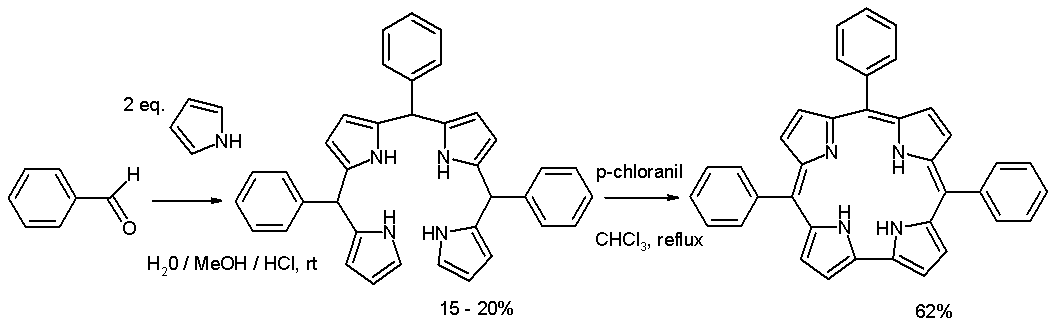
Corrole synthesis

== Comparison with porphyrins ==
Corrole and porphyrins differ in several ways. Corroles are triprotic, whereas porphyrins are diprotic. Because of the 3- charge of the triply deprotonated ligand, metallocorroles are formally high-valent. Several are redox-noninnocent, with a corrole radical-dianion ligand. A second difference between corroles and porphyrins is the size of the metal-binding cavity, i.e., 17- vs 18-membered rings. See "Porphyrins and similar compounds" in conjugated systems for more about these side by side images of porphyrin, chlorin, and corrin structures. Due to their lower symmetry, corroles display broader Soret or B-bands and relatively stronger Q-bands, compared to porphyrins. The absorption spectra of corroles in the UV/Visible range tends to be more sensitive towards substituents than in the case of porphyrins.

== Coordination complexes ==
Corroles have been attached to a wide range of transition metals, main group elements, and lanthanides, actinides. and the diprotonated, neutral corrole radical. Additionally, corroles and their metal complexes have been demonstrated to be useful as imaging agents in tumor detection, oxygen sensing, for prevention of heart disease, in synthetic chemistry as oxo, imido, and nitrido transfer agents, and as catalysts for the catalytic reduction of oxygen to water, and hydrogen production form water under aerobic conditions.

Protein-corrole particles have been investigated as carriers of theranostic cargo for tumor targeting.
