= 2,2',3,3',4,4'-Hexachlorobiphenyl =

- 2,2',3,3',4,4'-Hexachlorobiphenyl

Names
- Preferred IUPAC name 2,2′,3,3′,4,4′-Hexachloro-1,1′-biphenyl
- Other names Aroclor 1260; PCB128

Identifiers
| CAS Number | 11096-82-5 |
| 3D model (JSmol) | Interactive image |
| ChEMBL | ChEMBL3189099 |
| ChemSpider | 34853 |
| ECHA InfoCard | 100.217.312 |
| EC Number | 690-182-3 |
| PubChem CID | 38018 |
| RTECS number | IO2100000 |
| UNII | PJ11O9J71Y |
| UN number | 2315 |
| CompTox Dashboard (EPA) | DTXSID50858932 |
- InChI: InChI=1S/C12H4Cl6/c13-7-3-1-5(9(15)11(7)17)6-2-4-8(14)12(18)10(6)16/h1-4H Key: BTAGRXWGMYTPBY-UHFFFAOYSA-N
- SMILES: C1=CC(=C(C(=C1C2=C(C(=C(C=C2)Cl)Cl)Cl)Cl)Cl)Cl

Properties
| Chemical formula | C_{12}H_{4}Cl_{6} |
| Molar mass | 360.86 g·mol^{−1} |
| Appearance | Viscous oily liquid |
| Density | 1.40 g/mL |
| Melting point | 150.8 °C (303.4 °F; 423.9 K) |
| Solubility in water | 9.70^{−10} M |
| Vapor pressure | 4.05 × 10^{−5} mmHg @ 25 °C |

Hazards
- Occupational safety and health (OHS/OSH)
| Main hazards | potential carcinogen |
- GHS labelling
| Pictograms | (GHS08: Health hazard) (GHS09: Environmental hazard) |
| Signal word | Warning |
| Hazard statements | H373, H410 |
| Precautionary statements | P260, P273, P314, P391, P501 |
| NFPA 704 (fire diamond) | 2 1 0 |
| Flash point | 141 °C (286 °F; 414 K) |
- Except where otherwise noted, data are given for materials in their standard state (at 25 °C [77 °F], 100 kPa). verify (what is ?) Infobox references

2,2',3,3',4,4'-Hexachlorobiphenyl is an organic chemical and belongs to a group of compounds called polychlorinated biphenyls. This group of organic compounds was used in transformers as dielectric fluids, until production was banned in 1979. While only being a part of this mixture, it is sometimes referred to as Aroclor 1260.

== History ==
2,2’,3,3’,4,4’-Hexachlorobiphenyl was formerly used in electrical transformers, hydraulic fluids, plasticizer in synthetic resins and several daily applications such as paint, ink and surface coatings. Since January 1979 PCBs, including 2,2’,3,3’,4,4’-Hexachlorobiphenyl, were discontinued from the use in transformers and capacitors. However, because the life expectancy of this equipment can be multiple decades, they are still in use today.

In Belgium, at the end of January 1999, an accident occurred with PCB mixtures which included Aroclor 1260. A mixture of polychlorinated biphenyls contaminated with dioxins was accidentally added to animal food. The early signs of poisoning were already noticed in February 1999, but the source and extent of contamination were only discovered in May 1999. It appeared that more than 2500 farms could have been supplied with this contaminated food. This resulted in a major food crisis over the whole country and was later the start of the implementation of a large PCB/dioxin food monitoring program.

== Structure and reactivity ==
The IUPAC name of 2,2',3,3',4,4'-hexachlorobiphenyl is 1,2,3-trichloro-4-(2,3,4-trichlorophenyl) benzene and its molecular formula is C_{12}H_{4}Cl_{6}. It is a light yellow, soft, sticky resin and has a boiling point of 385-420 °C. Its flash point lies around 141 °C and its melting point around 150 °C.
2,2’,3,3’,4,4’-Hexachlorobiphenyl has a biological half-life of 436.52 days.

== Synthesis ==
2,2’,3,3’,4,4’-hexachlorobiphenyl can be synthesised with an Ullmann reaction. It was synthesised over Copper powder at 230 °C.

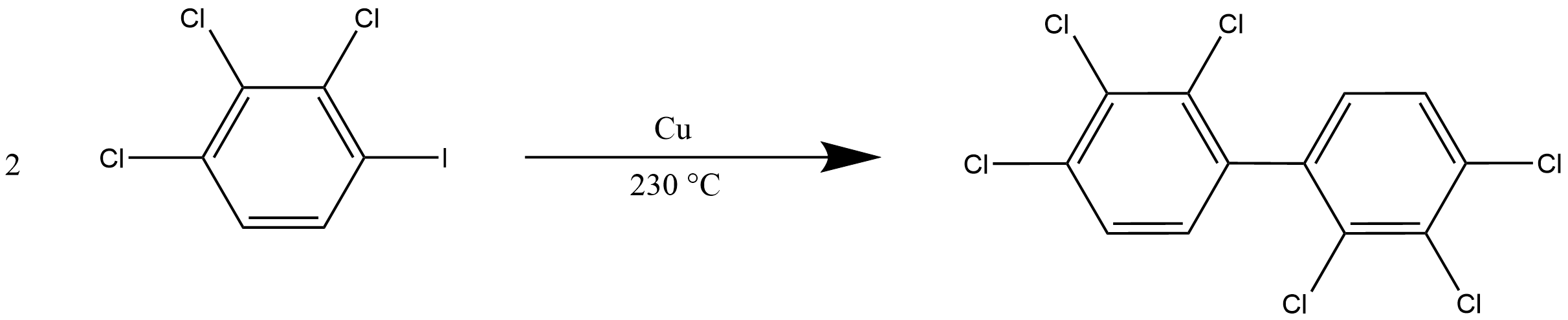

== Reactions ==
PCBs can be used to synthesise polychlorinated dibenzofurans, including tetrachlorinated dibenzofurans (TCDF) and pentachlorinated dibenzofurans (PenCDF). These compounds share a similar structure with polychlorinated dibenzo-p-dioxins. In particular, 2,2’,3,3’,4,4’-hexachlorodiphenyl is used to synthesise TCDF-3467 and PenCDF-12367. The synthesis is conducted with oxygen between 550 – 600 °C for 5s.

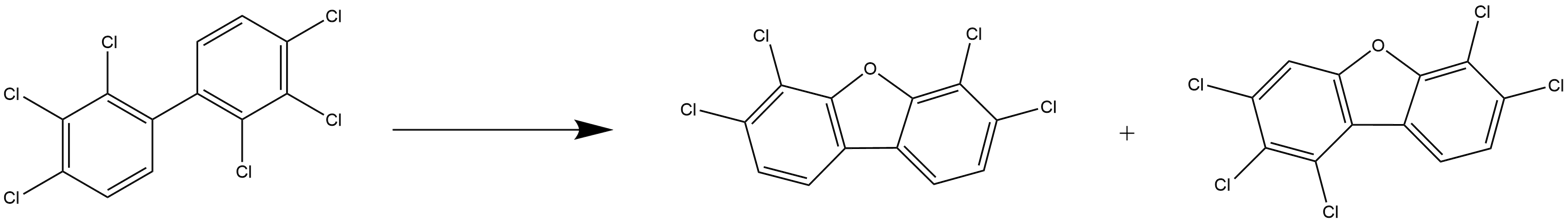

== Mechanism of action ==
Polychlorinated biphenyls have been reported to cause a disruption in cellular Ca^{2+} homeostasis and translocation of protein kinase C. This disruption is the result of increased ryanodine binding to calcium channels. It is speculated that mechanisms, dependant on the Ah receptor, are involved in neurological changes, but this is not yet fully understood. Other Ah independent pathways are also present in the formation of tumours. It has been found that 2,2',3,3',4,4'-hexachlorobiphenyl can promote tumour growth by inhibiting cellular communication. Cellular injury and proliferation can be caused by reactive metabolites of 2,2',3,3'4,4'-hexachlorobiphenyl or by an increased concentration of ROS, due to disruptions induced by 2,2',3,3',4,4'-hexachlorobiphenyl to CYP oxygenases, calcium homeostasis and glutathione S-transferases.

== Metabolism ==
A study by Borlakoglu JT et al. was done on pigeons, that were injected with Aroclor 1260, in combination with other PCBs. 120 hours after the injection, the animals were killed and the quantity of the different PCBs in certain organs of the remains was investigated. Accumulation of the compounds was evaluated based on elimination factors, where organs that present with high microsomal monooxygenase activity had the highest factor for the individual PCBs. It was shown that the toxicity depends on the meta, para or ortho positions of the chlorine. In general, 90% of the PCBs were accumulated in the adipose tissue of the remains, 2% in the kidneys. 1% of each compound was found in the brain, muscles, and heart while 0.1% was present in the blood.

Multiple animal studies, summarized by the Agency for Toxic Substances & Disease Registry, implied that mixtures of PCB have properties to cross the placental barrier and to accumulate in the fetus. Additionally, a high concentration of lipid-soluble PCBs was found to reside in the motherly milk, fed to the offspring. Aroclor 1260 administered to rabbits before pregnancy, showed an accumulation of PCBs in the embryo's cells on the sixth day but not on the first one. In a study with mice, that were administered PCBs in the first 18 days of pregnancy, the largest concentrations of PCBs were found in 1-2-week-old offspring. A study investigating monkeys that were fed with PCBs before and during pregnancy found that the abundance of PCBs in suckling offspring increased with ongoing lactation. After removing the motherly milk from the diet of the offspring, the concentration of PCBs in the blood decreased. No proof was found for intoxication effects in neonates. A study conducted on rats, where PCBs were introduced before pregnancy, indicates that 0.003% of the PCBs present in the females crossed the placental barrier to the fetus. 5% of the PCBs present in the body of the female animals was relocated to the suckling offspring. Another study using ferrets confirmed the results. From those studies, it was concluded that the administration of PCBs to the offspring via the mother milk poses a larger risk than the compounds crossing the placental barrier. However, it was argued that the fetus, exposed via the placental barrier, is more sensitive to the PCBs.

== Efficacy ==
2,2',3,3',4,4'-hexachlorobiphenyl has been used frequently up and until the ban in late 1977 in closed systems such as transformers, capacitors and electromagnets and open systems like waxes, paints or plasticizers. Scientists had discovered in 1966 that polychlorobiphenyls (PCBs) are bioaccumulated and virtually indestructible, thus unfavourable for the environment and unhealthy for humans.
While most PCBs are considered fire-resistant due to their high flashpoint (170-380 °C), 2,2’,3,3’,4,4’-hexachlorobiphenyl has a lower flash point of 141 °C. Most PCBs have high thermal conductivity and high resistance, which is the reason they were used in electrical equipment. Although the efficacy of using PCBs was high, excellent alternatives have been found. Aromatics such as isopropylbiphenyls and isopropylchlorobiphenyls were used as a substitute for PCBs as dielectric capacitors and transformers [4]. Polydimethylsiloxanes and paraffins were also used as replacements in transformer dielectrics and other electrical uses.

== Toxicity ==
2,2’,3,3’,4,4’-hexachlorobiphenyl has been found to cause accumulation of porphyrin in the liver in rats, which could presumably lead to hepatic porphyria. This is not sure, however, since few studies have been done on the metabolism of 2,2’,3,3’,4,4’-hexachlorobiphenyl. All polychlorinated biphenyls are classified as a type B2 carcinogen in the IRIS database after a study found them to be carcinogenic in rats. Because current human evidence is incomplete, there is only data suggesting the carcinogenic effects of PCBs in humans. While little research has been done on the toxic effects of 2,2’,3,3’,4,4’-hexachlorobiphenyl, PCBs have been found to cause irritation in the eyes and when inhaled also in the airways. They may cause a rash when in contact with the skin and prolonged exposure can result in chloracne. High exposure to PCBs can also cause damage to the liver and the nervous system. Aroclor 1260 in particular is found to cause metabolic disorders such as non-alcoholic fatty liver disorder, diabetes and obesity. When interacting with other highly toxic chemicals, like PCDDs or PCDFs, toxic effects are generally more severe. Synergistic and additive interactions have been observed to affect tumour promotion.

=== Effect on animals ===
A study conducted on rats exposed to various amounts of 2,2’,3,3’,4,4’-hexachlorobiphenyl found increased activation of ethoxyresorufin deethylase and aminopyrine demethylase. However, while also observing an increased liver wight, it did not find any toxic effects. While there is not a lot of data on the effects of 2,2’,3,3’,4,4’-hexachlorobiphenyl, a single dose of Aroclor 1260 injected into pigeons caused them to die 120 hours later.
