= Erythrodontia =

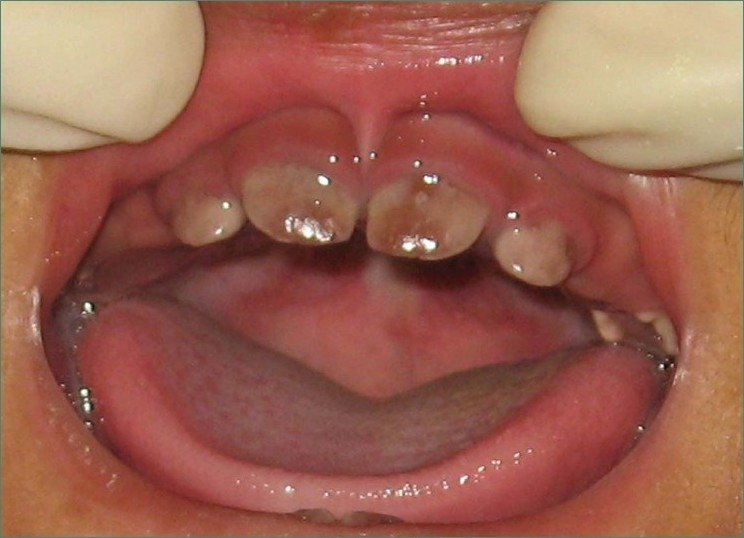
- Brown discoloration of the teeth caused by porphyrin accumulation.
- Specialty: Pediatrics, Dentistry
- Causes: Gunther disease

Erythrodontia is the red discoloration of teeth. It can be seen in congenital erythropoietic porphyria.

== See also ==
- List of dental abnormalities associated with cutaneous conditions
