= List of dental abnormalities associated with cutaneous conditions =

Many conditions of or affecting the human integumentary system have associated abnormalities of the teeth.

Dental abnormalities associated with conditions of or affecting the human integumentary system
Abnormality	Condition(s)
Pegged teeth	Hypohidrotic ectodermal dysplasia Incontinentia pigmenti Congenital syphilis
Pitted teeth	Herlitz variant of junctional epidermolysis bullosa Tuberous sclerosis Gorlin syndrome Tricho–dento–osseous syndrome
Retention of primary teeth	Hyper-IgE syndrome
Non-erupted teeth	Gardner syndrome
Supernumerary teeth	Gardner syndrome
Hypodontia	Hypomelanosis of Ito; Schöpf–Schulz–Passarge syndrome Hypohidrotic ectodermal dysplasia EEC syndrome AEC syndrome
Erythrodontia	Congenital erythropoietic porphyria Hepatoerythropoietic porphyria
Eroded tooth enamel	Bulimia
Loss of deciduous and permanent teeth by late childhood	Papillon–Lefèvre syndrome Haim–Munk syndrome
Premature dentition (Natal teeth)	Pachyonychia congenita type II
Grey–green discoloration of the mid-portion of permanent teeth	Minocycline-induced pigmentation
Brown discoloration of gingival third of teeth	Tetracycline-induced pigmentation

== See also ==
- List of cutaneous conditions
- List of contact allergens
- List of cutaneous conditions associated with internal malignancy
- List of cutaneous conditions caused by mutations in keratins
- List of cutaneous conditions caused by problems with junctional proteins
- List of genes mutated in cutaneous conditions
- List of histologic stains that aid in diagnosis of cutaneous conditions
- List of immunofluorescence findings for autoimmune bullous conditions
- List of inclusion bodies that aid in diagnosis of cutaneous conditions
- List of keratins expressed in the human integumentary system
- List of radiographic findings associated with cutaneous conditions
- List of specialized glands within the human integumentary system
- List of target antigens in pemphigoid
- List of target antigens in pemphigus
