= List of fellows of the Royal Society elected in 1966 =

This article lists fellows of the Royal Society elected in 1966.

== Fellows ==
1. Sir Alan Rushton Battersby
2. Thomas Brooke Benjamin
3. Kenneth Budden
4. Robert Ernest Davies
5. Sir Richard Doll
6. Sir Samuel Frederick Edwards
7. John Samuel Forrest
8. Francis Charles Fraser
9. Harry Harris
10. Donald Olding Hebb
11. Sir William Kenneth Hutchison
12. Alick Isaacs
13. Basil Kassanis
14. Ralph Ambrose Kekwick
15. Sir Percy Edward Kent
16. Desmond George King-Hele
17. Sir Francis Gerald William Knowles
18. Georg Kreisel
19. Sir Cyril Edward Lucas
20. James Dwyer McGee
21. Sir James Woodham Menter
22. Arthur Ernest Mourant
23. Egon Sharpe Pearson
24. Donald Hill Perkins
25. Lillian Mary Pickford
26. Heinz Otto Schild
27. Herbert Muggleton Stanley
28. Bruce Arnold Dunbar Stocker
29. John Sutton
30. Michael Szwarc
31. David Hardy Whiffen
32. Sir Frederick White

== Foreign members ==
1. Jean Brachet
2. Haldan Keffer Hartline
3. Louis Eugene Felix Neel
4. Andre Weil

== Statute 12 fellow ==
1. Louis Mountbatten, 1st Earl Mountbatten of Burma
