= Pyruvate oxidase =

pyruvate oxidase

Identifiers
- EC no.: 1.2.3.3
- CAS no.: 9001-96-1

Databases
- BRENDA: enzyme data
- ExPASy: NiceZyme view
- KEGG: enzyme entry
- MetaCyc: metabolic pathway
- Rhea: reactions
- PDB structures: RCSB PDB PDBe PDBsum
- Gene Ontology: AmiGO / QuickGO
Search
- PMC: articles
- PubMed: articles
- NCBI: proteins

In enzymology, pyruvate oxidase (EC 1.2.3.3) is an enzyme that catalyzes the chemical reaction

pyruvic acid
+
phosphoric acid
O_{2}
H_{2}O_{2}
O_{2}
H_{2}O_{2}
acetyl phosphate
+ CO_{2}

The three substrates of this enzyme are pyruvic acid, phosphate, and oxygen. Its products are acetyl phosphate, carbon dioxide, and hydrogen peroxide.

This enzyme belongs to the family of oxidoreductases, specifically those acting on the aldehyde or oxo group of donor with oxygen as acceptor. The systematic name of this enzyme class is pyruvate:oxygen 2-oxidoreductase (phosphorylating). Other names in common use include pyruvic oxidase, and phosphate-dependent pyruvate oxidase. This enzyme participates in pyruvate metabolism. It has 2 cofactors: FAD, and Thiamin diphosphate.

== Structural studies ==
As of late 2007, 12 structures have been solved for this class of enzymes, with PDB accession codes PDB: 1POW, PDB: 1POX, PDB: 1V5E, PDB: 1V5F, PDB: 1V5G, PDB: 1Y9D, PDB: 2DJI, PDB: 2EZ4, PDB: 2EZ8, PDB: 2EZ9, PDB: 2EZT, and PDB: 2EZU.
