= Porphyrin =

Class of organic compounds

Porphine, the parent of porphyrin

Porphyrins (/ˈpɔːrfərɪns/ POR-fər-ins) are heterocyclic, macrocyclic, organic compounds, composed of four modified pyrrole subunits interconnected at their α carbon atoms via methine bridges (=CH−), so they are cyclic tetrapyrroles. In vertebrates, an essential member of the porphyrin group is heme, which is a component of hemoproteins, whose functions include carrying oxygen in the bloodstream. In plants, an essential porphyrin derivative is chlorophyll, which is involved in light harvesting and electron transfer in photosynthesis.

The parent of porphyrins is porphine, a rare chemical compound of exclusively theoretical interest. Substituted porphines are called porphyrins. With a total of 26 π-electrons the porphyrin ring structure is a coordinated aromatic system. One result of the large conjugated system is that porphyrins absorb strongly in the visible region of the electromagnetic spectrum, i.e. they are deeply colored. The name "porphyrin" derives from Greek πορφύρα (porphyra) 'purple'.

== Structure ==
Porphyrin complexes consist of a square planar MN_{4} core. The periphery of the porphyrins, consisting of sp^{2}-hybridized carbons, generally display small deviations from planarity. For free porphyrins, the two pyrrole protons are mutually trans, projecting above and below the N_{4} plane, respectively. "Ruffled" or saddle-shaped porphyrins are formed by the interactions of the ring system with its environment. Additionally, the metal is often not centered in the N_{4} plane. These nonplanar distortions are associated with altered chemical and physical properties. Chlorophyll rings are more distinctly nonplanar, but they are more saturated than porphyrins.

== Complexes of porphyrins ==
Concomitant with the displacement of two N-H protons, porphyrins bind metal ions in the N4 "pocket". The metal ion usually has a charge of 2+ or 3+. A schematic equation for these syntheses is shown, where M = metal ion and L = a ligand:

H_{2}porphyrin + [ML_{n}]^{2+} → M(porphyrinate)L_{n−4} + 4 L + 2 H^{+}

Representative porphyrins and derivatives

Derivatives of protoporphyrin IX are common in nature, the precursor to hemes.

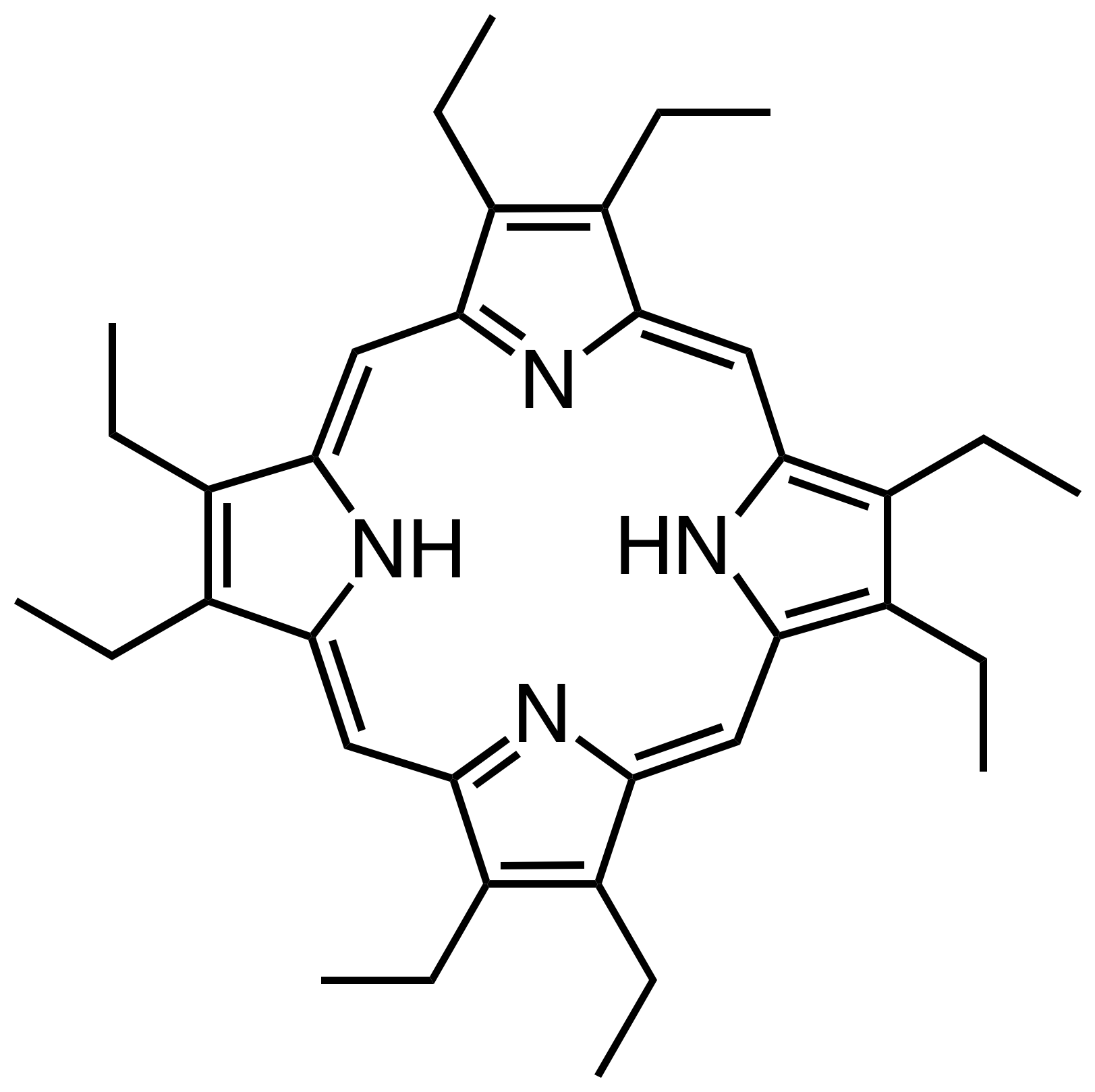
Octaethylporphyrin (H_{2}OEP) is a synthetic analogue of protoporphyrin IX. Unlike the natural porphyrin ligands, OEP^{2−} is highly symmetrical.

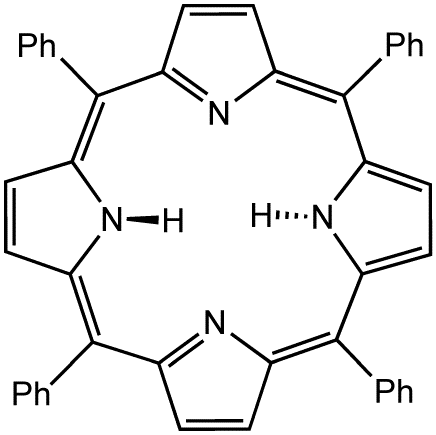
Tetraphenylporphyrin (H_{2}TPP)is another synthetic analogue of protoporphyrin IX. Unlike the natural porphyrin ligands, TPP^{2−} is highly symmetrical. Another difference is that each methyne carbon is attached to a phenyl ring.

Simplified view of heme, a complex of a protoporphyrin IX

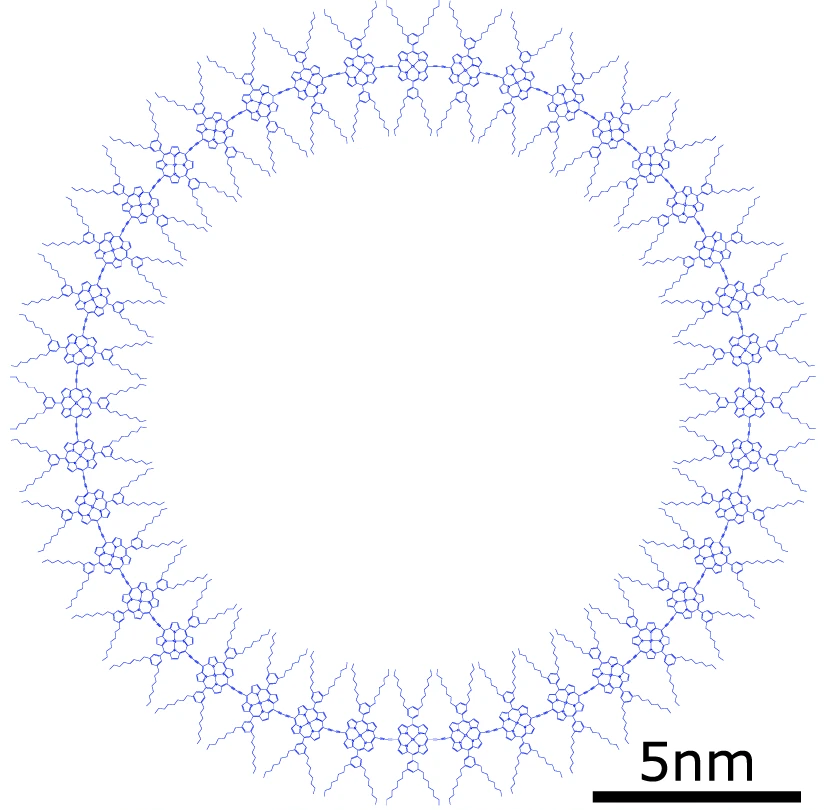
A nanoring of 40 porphyrin molecules, model

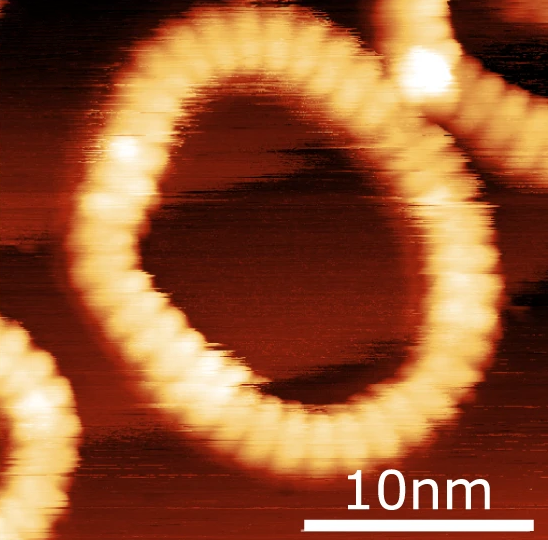
A nanoring of 40 porphyrin molecules, STM image

== Ancient porphyrins ==
A geoporphyrin, also known as a petroporphyrin, is a porphyrin of geologic origin. They can occur in crude oil, oil shale, coal, or sedimentary rocks. Abelsonite is possibly the only geoporphyrin mineral, as it is rare for porphyrins to occur in isolation and form crystals.

The field of organic geochemistry had its origins in the isolation of porphyrins from petroleum. These findings helped establish the biological origins of petroleum. Petroleum is sometimes "fingerprinted" by analysis of trace amounts of nickel and vanadyl porphyrins. Metalloporphyrins in general are highly stable organic compounds, and the detailed structures of the extracted derivatives made clear that they originated from chlorophyll.

== Biosynthesis ==
In non-photosynthetic eukaryotes such as animals, insects, fungi, and protozoa, as well as the α-proteobacteria group of bacteria, the committed step for porphyrin biosynthesis is the formation of δ-aminolevulinic acid (δ-ALA, 5-ALA or dALA) by the reaction of the amino acid glycine with succinyl-CoA from the citric acid cycle. In plants, algae, bacteria (except for the α-proteobacteria group) and archaea, it is produced from glutamic acid via glutamyl-tRNA and glutamate-1-semialdehyde. The enzymes involved in this pathway are glutamyl-tRNA synthetase, glutamyl-tRNA reductase, and glutamate-1-semialdehyde 2,1-aminomutase. This pathway is known as the C5 or Beale pathway.

Two molecules of dALA are then combined by porphobilinogen synthase to give porphobilinogen (PBG), which contains a pyrrole ring. Four PBGs are then combined through deamination into hydroxymethyl bilane (HMB), which is hydrolysed to form the circular tetrapyrrole uroporphyrinogen III. This molecule undergoes a number of further modifications. Intermediates are used in different species to form particular substances, but, in humans, the main end-product protoporphyrin IX is combined with iron to form heme. Bile pigments are the breakdown products of heme.

The following scheme summarizes the biosynthesis of porphyrins, with references by EC number and the OMIM database. The porphyria associated with the deficiency of each enzyme is also shown:

Heme B biosynthesis pathway and its modulators. Major enzyme deficiences are also shown.

Enzyme	Location	Substrate	Product	Chromosome	EC	OMIM	Disorder
ALA synthase	Mitochondrion	Glycine, succinyl CoA	δ-Aminolevulinic acid	3p21.1	2.3.1.37	125290	X-linked dominant protoporphyria, X-linked sideroblastic anemia
ALA dehydratase	Cytosol	δ-Aminolevulinic acid	Porphobilinogen	9q34	4.2.1.24	125270	aminolevulinic acid dehydratase deficiency porphyria
PBG deaminase	Cytosol	Porphobilinogen	Hydroxymethyl bilane	11q23.3	2.5.1.61	176000	acute intermittent porphyria
Uroporphyrinogen III synthase	Cytosol	Hydroxymethyl bilane	Uroporphyrinogen III	10q25.2-q26.3	4.2.1.75	606938	congenital erythropoietic porphyria
Uroporphyrinogen III decarboxylase	Cytosol	Uroporphyrinogen III	Coproporphyrinogen III	1p34	4.1.1.37	176100	porphyria cutanea tarda, hepatoerythropoietic porphyria
Coproporphyrinogen III oxidase	Mitochondrion	Coproporphyrinogen III	Protoporphyrinogen IX	3q12	1.3.3.3	121300	hereditary coproporphyria
Protoporphyrinogen oxidase	Mitochondrion	Protoporphyrinogen IX	Protoporphyrin IX	1q22	1.3.3.4	600923	variegate porphyria
Ferrochelatase	Mitochondrion	Protoporphyrin IX	Heme	18q21.3	4.99.1.1	177000	erythropoietic protoporphyria

== Laboratory synthesis ==
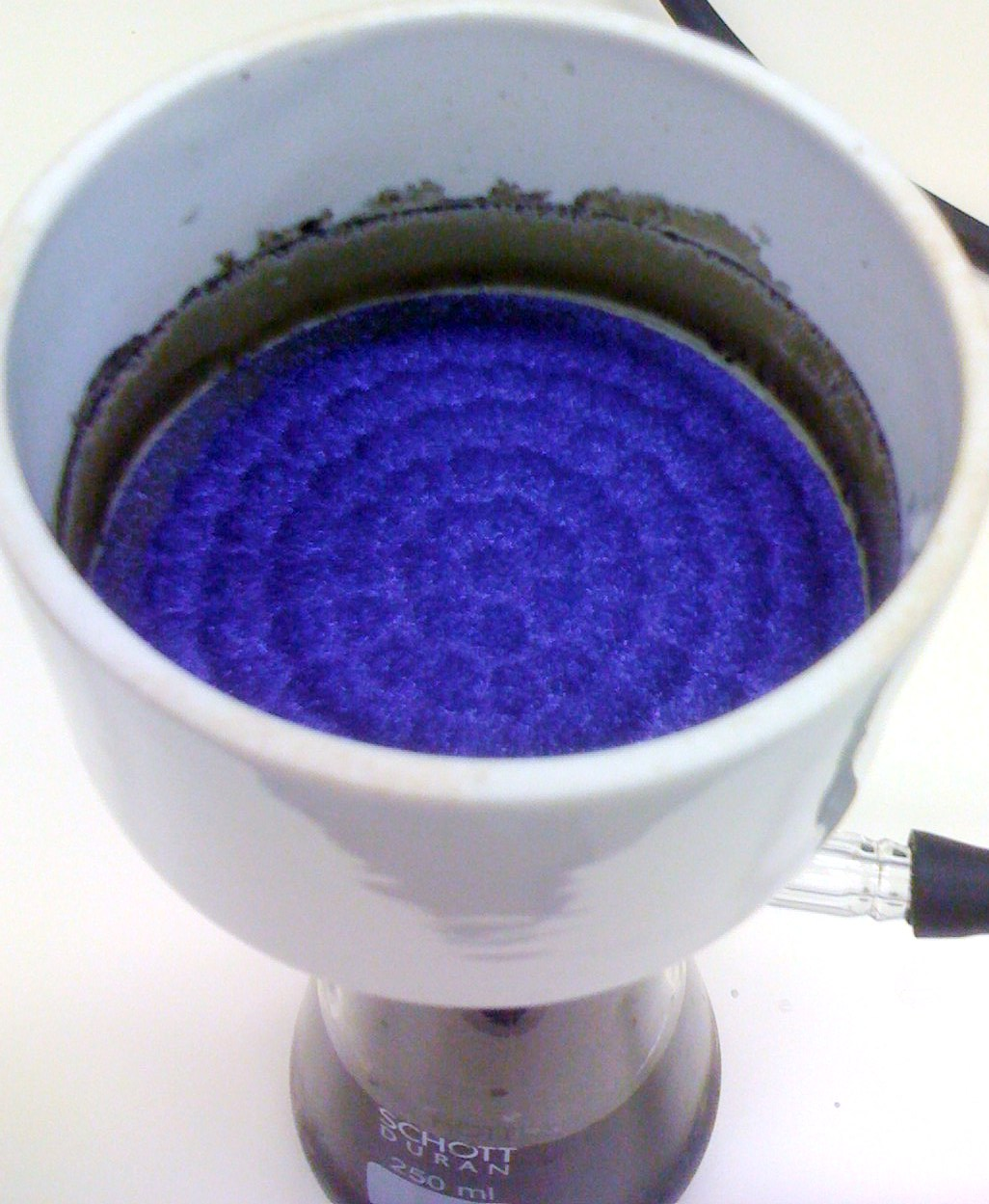
Brilliant crystals of meso-tetratolylporphyrin, prepared from 4-methylbenzaldehyde and pyrrole in refluxing propionic acid

A common synthesis for porphyrins is the Rothemund reaction, first reported in 1936, which is also the basis for more recent methods described by Adler and Longo. The general scheme is a condensation and oxidation process starting with pyrrole and an aldehyde.

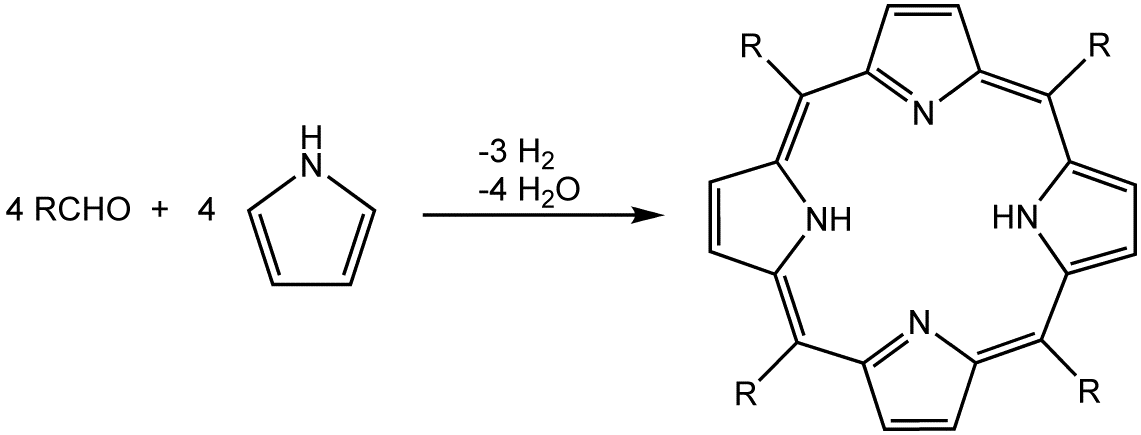

== Potential applications ==
=== Photodynamic therapy ===
Porphyrins have been evaluated in the context of photodynamic therapy (PDT) since they strongly absorb light, which is then converted to heat in the illuminated areas. This technique has been applied in macular degeneration using verteporfin.

PDT is considered a noninvasive cancer treatment, involving the interaction between light of a determined frequency, a photo-sensitizer, and oxygen. This interaction produces the formation of a highly reactive oxygen species (ROS), usually singlet oxygen, as well as superoxide anion, free hydroxyl radical, or hydrogen peroxide. These high reactive oxygen species react with susceptible cellular organic biomolecules such as; lipids, aromatic amino acids, and nucleic acid heterocyclic bases, to produce oxidative radicals that damage the cell, possibly inducing apoptosis or even necrosis.

=== Molecular electronics and sensors ===
Porphyrin-based compounds are of interest as possible components of molecular electronics and photonics. Synthetic porphyrin dyes have been incorporated in prototype dye-sensitized solar cells.

=== Biological applications ===
Porphyrins have been investigated as possible anti-inflammatory agents and evaluated on their anti-cancer and anti-oxidant activity. Several porphyrin-peptide conjugates were found to have antiviral activity against HIV in vitro.

=== Toxicology ===
Heme biosynthesis is used as biomarker in environmental toxicology studies. While excess production of porphyrins indicate organochlorine exposure, lead inhibits ALA dehydratase enzyme.

=== Photochemistry ===
Free-base porphyrins, including naturally occurring protoporphyrin IX (PPIX), function as viable photoredox catalysts under red-light irradiation. Red light provides deeper tissue and media penetration, making this approach suitable for aqueous biomolecule functionalization.

== Gallery ==
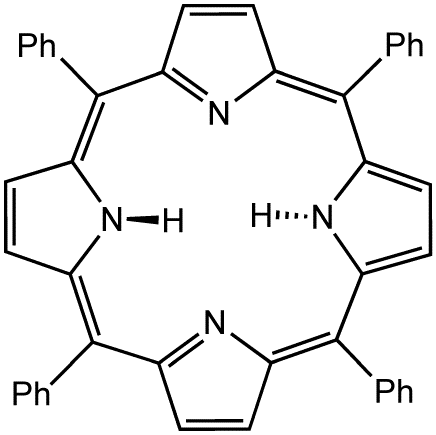
Lewis structure for meso-tetraphenylporphyrin

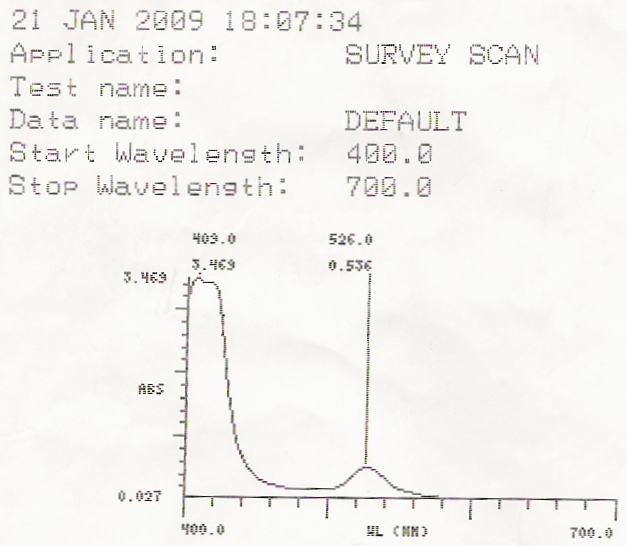
UV–vis readout for meso-tetraphenylporphyrin

Light-activated porphyrin. Monatomic oxygen. Cellular aging.

== Related species ==
=== In nature ===
Several heterocycles related to porphyrins are found in nature, almost always bound to metal ions. These include

N4-macrocycle	Cofactor name	metal	comment
chlorin	chlorophyll	magnesium	several versions of chlorophyll exist (sidechain; exception being chlorophyll c)
bacteriochlorin	bacteriochlorophyll (in part)	magnesium	several versions of bacteriochlorophyll exist (sidechain; some use a usual chlorin ring)
sirohydrochlorin (an isobacteriochlorin)	siroheme	iron	Important cofactor in sulfur assimilation
sirohydrochlorin (an isobacteriochlorin)			biosynthetic intermediate en route to cofactor F430 and B12
corrin	vitamin B12	cobalt	several variants of B12 exist (sidechain)
corphin	Cofactor F430	nickel	highly reduced macrocycle

=== Synthetic ===
A benzoporphyrin is a porphyrin with a benzene ring fused to one of the pyrrole units. e.g. verteporfin is a benzoporphyrin derivative.

==== Non-natural porphyrin isomers ====
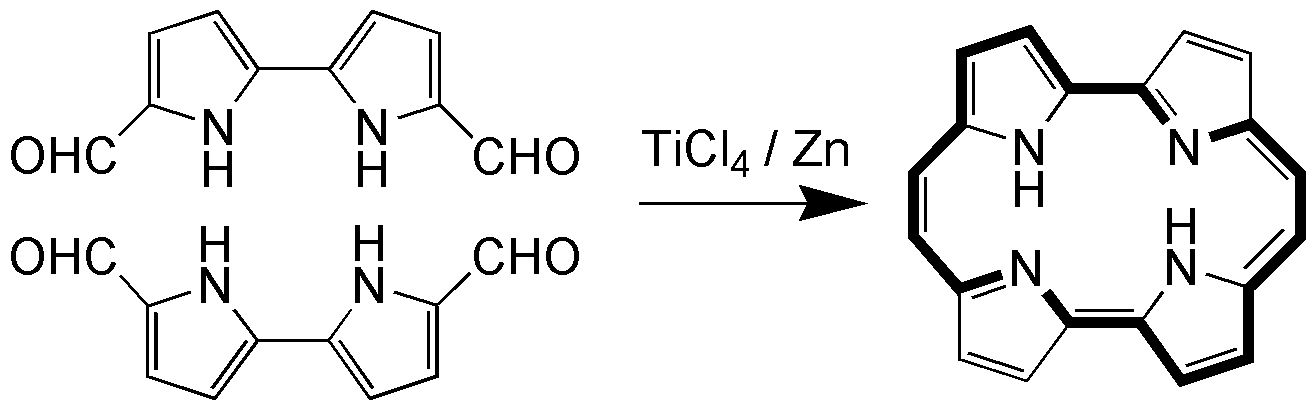
Porphycene, first porphyrin isomer, synthesised from bipyrrole dialdehyde through McMurry coupling reaction

The first synthetic porphyrin isomer was reported by Emanual Vogel and coworkers in 1986. This isomer [18]porphyrin-(2.0.2.0) is named as porphycene, and the central N_{4} Cavity forms a rectangle shape as shown in figure. Porphycenes showed interesting photophysical behavior and found versatile compound towards the photodynamic therapy. This result was followed by the preparation of [18]porphyrin-(2.1.0.1), named it as corrphycene or porphycerin. Other non-natural porphyrins include [18]porphyrin-(2.1.1.0) and [18]porphyrin-(3.0.1.0) or isoporphycene. The N-confused porphyrins feature one of the pyrrolic subunits with the nitrogen atoms facing outwards from the core of the macrocycle.

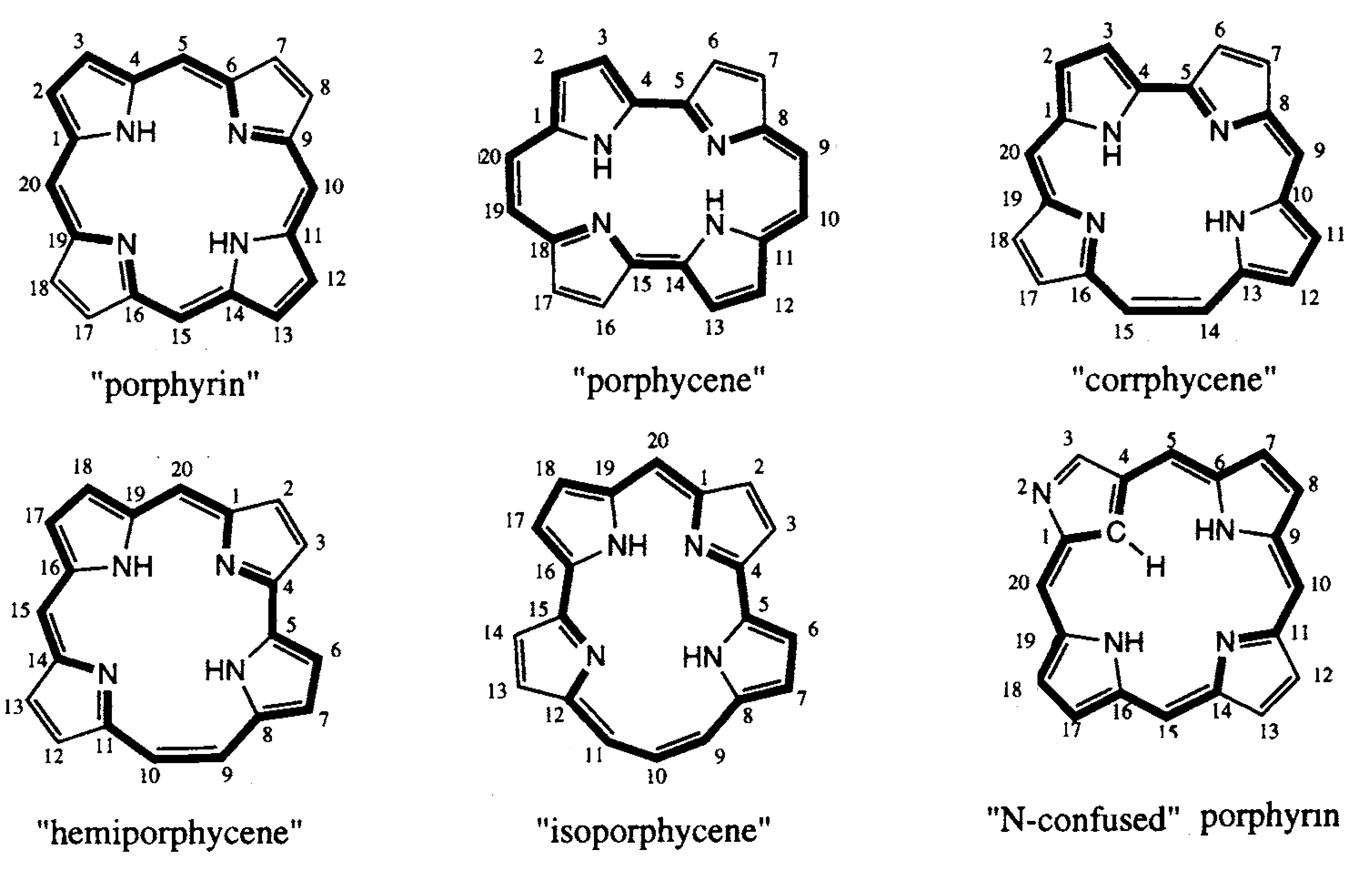
Various reported Isomers of porphyrin

== See also ==
- Porphyria – Metabolic disorders in which porphyrins build up in the body
- Heme – Chemical coordination complex of an iron ion chelated to a porphyrin
- Cytochrome P450 – A class of enzymes containing heme
- Chlorophyll – Closely related to porphyrin
- Corroles – A closely related class of molecules, including vitamin B_{12}
- Cofactor F430 contains porphyrin.
- Phthalocyanine and tetrapyrazinoporphyrazine are nitrogen-substituted porphyrins.
- Tetraanthraporphyrin – Extended porphyrin
