= Porphobilinogen =

Intermediate in the biosynthesis of porphyrins

Names
- Preferred IUPAC name 3-[5-(Aminomethyl)-4-(carboxymethyl)-1H-pyrrol-3-yl]propanoic acid

Identifiers
CAS Number	487-90-1
3D model (JSmol)	Interactive image
ChemSpider	995
DrugBank	DB02272
ECHA InfoCard	100.006.970
EC Number	207-666-3
MeSH	Porphobilinogen
PubChem CID	1021
UNII	74KHC72QXK
CompTox Dashboard (EPA)	DTXSID4060070
- InChI: InChI=1S/C10H14N2O4/c11-4-8-7(3-10(15)16)6(5-12-8)1-2-9(13)14/h5,12H,1-4,11H2,(H,13,14)(H,15,16) Key: QSHWIQZFGQKFMA-UHFFFAOYSA-N
- SMILES: C1=C(C(=C(N1)CN)CC(=O)O)CCC(=O)O

Properties
Chemical formula	C_{10}H_{14}N_{2}O_{4}
Molar mass	226.229
- Except where otherwise noted, data are given for materials in their standard state (at 25 °C [77 °F], 100 kPa). Infobox references

Porphobilinogen (PBG) is an organic compound that occurs in living organisms as an intermediate in the biosynthesis of porphyrins, which include critical substances like hemoglobin and chlorophyll.

Porphobilinogen can be described as a pyrrole with substituents at positions 2, 3 and 4. These substituents are respectively, an aminomethyl group −CH_{2}−NH_{2}, a carboxymethyl group −CH_{2}−COOH, and a carboxyethyl group −CH_{2}−CH_{2}−COOH.

== Biosynthesis ==
In an early step of the porphyrin biosynthesis pathway, porphobilinogen is generated from aminolevulinic acid (ALA) by the enzyme ALA dehydratase.

2
aminolevulinic acid
2 H_{2}O
porphobilinogen

== Metabolism ==
Next in the pathway towards porphyrins, four molecules of porphobilinogen are combined into hydroxymethyl bilane by the enzyme porphobilinogen deaminase:

4
porphobilinogen
H_{2}O
4 NH_{3}
hydroxymethylbilane

== Pathologies ==
Acute intermittent porphyria causes an increase in urinary porphobilinogen.
