= Uroporphyrinogen III =

Names
- IUPAC name 3-[7,12,18-Tris(2-carboxyethyl)-3,8,13,17-tetrakis(carboxymethyl)-5,10,15,20,21,22,23,24-octahydroporphyrin-2-yl]propanoic acid

Identifiers
CAS Number	1976-85-8
3D model (JSmol)	Interactive image
Beilstein Reference	605190
ChEBI	CHEBI:15437
ChemSpider	1146
Gmelin Reference	1166130
KEGG	C01051
MeSH	Uroporphyrinogen+III
PubChem CID	1179
CompTox Dashboard (EPA)	DTXSID40173444
- InChI: InChI=1S/C40H44N4O16/c45-33(46)5-1-17-21(9-37(53)54)29-14-27-19(3-7-35(49)50)22(10-38(55)56)30(43-27)15-28-20(4-8-36(51)52)24(12-40(59)60)32(44-28)16-31-23(11-39(57)58)18(2-6-34(47)48)26(42-31)13-25(17)41-29/h41-44H,1-16H2,(H,45,46)(H,47,48)(H,49,50)(H,51,52)(H,53,54)(H,55,56)(H,57,58)(H,59,60) Key: HUHWZXWWOFSFKF-UHFFFAOYSA-N
- SMILES: O=C(O)CCc1c2[nH]c(c1CC(=O)O)Cc1[nH]c(c(CC(=O)O)c1CCC(=O)O)Cc1[nH]c(c(CC(=O)O)c1CCC(=O)O)Cc1[nH]c(c(CCC(=O)O)c1CC(=O)O)C2

Properties
Chemical formula	C_{40}H_{44}N_{4}O_{16}
Molar mass	836.804 g/mol
- Except where otherwise noted, data are given for materials in their standard state (at 25 °C [77 °F], 100 kPa). Infobox references

Uroporphyrinogen III is a tetrapyrrole, the first macrocyclic intermediate in the biosynthesis of heme, chlorophyll, vitamin B12, and siroheme. It is a colorless compound, like other porphyrinogens.

== Structure ==
The molecular structure of uroporphyrinogen III can be described as a hexahydroporphine core, where each pyrrole ring has the hydrogen atoms on its two outermost carbons replaced by an acetic acid group (−CH_{2}−COOH, "A") and a propionic acid group (−CH_{2}−CH_{2}−COOH, "P"). The groups are attached in an asymmetric way: going around the macrocycle, the order is AP-AP-AP-PA.

== Biosynthesis and metabolism ==
In the general porphyrin biosynthesis pathway, uroporphyrinogen III is derived from the linear tetrapyrrole hydroxymethylbilane by the action of the enzyme uroporphyrinogen-III synthase. This catalyses the cyclisation reaction via a spiro intermediate which allows one of the pyrrole rings to convert its initial acetate to propionate configuration into a propionate-acetate one.

hydroxymethylbilane
H_{2}O
H_{2}O
uroporphyrinogen III

In the biosynthesis of hemes and chlorophylls, uroporphyrinogen III is converted into coproporphyrinogen III by the enzyme uroporphyrinogen III decarboxylase.

uroporphyrinogen III
4 CO_{2}
4 CO_{2}
coproporphyrinogen III

In the biosynthesis of sirohemes, uroporphyrinogen III is converted by two methyl transferases to dihydrosirohydrochlorin, which is subsequently oxidized sirohydrochlorin, a precursor to the siroheme prosthetic group.

== Medical significance ==
If uroporphyrinogen-III synthase is not present or inactive, the hydroxymethylbilane will spontaneously cyclise into the structural isomer uroporphyrinogen I, which differs from the III isomer in that the acetic acid ("A") and propionic acid ("P") groups are arranged in a rotationally symmetric order, AP-AP-AP-AP. In this case, the next step produced coproporphyrinogen I, which accumulates — leading to the pathological condition congenital erythropoietic porphyria

== See also ==
- Uroporphyrinogen
