= Hydroxymethylbilane =

Intermediate in the synthesis of porphyrins

Names
- IUPAC name 3,3′,3′′,3′′′-[3,8,13,18-Tetrakis(carboxymethyl)-19-(hydroxymethyl)-5,10,15,22,23,24-hexahydro-21H-biline-2,7,12,17-tetrayl]tetrapropanoic acid
- Systematic IUPAC name 3,3′,3′′,3′′′-[1^{4},3^{3},5^{3},7^{3}-Tetrakis(carboxymethyl)-1^{5}-(hydroxymethyl)-1^{1}H,3^{1}H,5^{1}H,7^{1}H-1,7(2),3,5(2,5)-tetrapyrrolaheptaphane-1^{3},3^{4},5^{4},7^{4}-tetrayl]tetrapropanoic acid

Identifiers
CAS Number	71861-60-4
3D model (JSmol)	Interactive image
Beilstein Reference	1209089
ChEBI	CHEBI:16645
ChEMBL	ChEMBL273676
ChemSpider	767
KEGG	C01024
MeSH	hydroxymethylbilane
PubChem CID	788
CompTox Dashboard (EPA)	DTXSID001105025
- InChI: InChI=1S/C40H46N4O17/c45-17-32-25(12-40(60)61)21(4-8-36(52)53)29(44-32)15-31-24(11-39(58)59)20(3-7-35(50)51)28(43-31)14-30-23(10-38(56)57)19(2-6-34(48)49)27(42-30)13-26-22(9-37(54)55)18(16-41-26)1-5-33(46)47/h16,41-45H,1-15,17H2,(H,46,47)(H,48,49)(H,50,51)(H,52,53)(H,54,55)(H,56,57)(H,58,59)(H,60,61) Key: WDFJYRZCZIUBPR-UHFFFAOYSA-N
- SMILES: O=C(O)Cc1c(c[nH]c1Cc2c(c(c([nH]2)Cc3[nH]c(c(c3CCC(=O)O)CC(=O)O)Cc4c(c(c([nH]4)CO)CC(=O)O)CCC(=O)O)CC(=O)O)CCC(=O)O)CCC(=O)O

Properties
Chemical formula	C_{40}H_{46}N_{4}O_{17}
Molar mass	854.81 g/mol
- Except where otherwise noted, data are given for materials in their standard state (at 25 °C [77 °F], 100 kPa). Infobox references

Hydroxymethylbilane, also known as preuroporphyrinogen, is an organic compound that occurs in living organisms during the synthesis of porphyrins, a group of critical substances that include haemoglobin, myoglobin, and chlorophyll. The name is often abbreviated as HMB.

== Structure ==
The compound is a substituted bilane, a chain of four pyrrole rings interconnected by methylene bridges −CH_{2}−. The chain starts with a hydroxymethyl group −CH_{2}−OH and ends with a hydrogen, in place of the respective methylene bridges. The other two carbon atoms of each pyrrole cycle are connected to an acetic acid group −CH_{2}−COOH and a propionic acid group −CH_{2}−CH_{2}−COOH, in that order.

== Metabolism ==
HMB is generated from four molecules of porphobilinogen by the enzyme porphobilinogen deaminase in the overall reaction:

4
porphobilinogen
H_{2}O
4 NH_{3}
hydroxymethylbilane

The enzyme uroporphyrinogen III synthase catalyses the cyclisation reaction of hydroxymethylbilane into uroporphyrinogen III via a spiro intermediate which allows one of the pyrrole rings to convert its initial acetate to propionate configuration into a propionate-acetate one.

hydroxymethylbilane
H_{2}O
H_{2}O
uroporphyrinogen III

Uroporphyrinogen III is a porphyrinogen, which is a class of compounds with the hexahydroporphine macrocycle. In the absence of the enzyme, the compound undergoes spontaneous cyclization and becomes uroporphyrinogen I.
