= Porphobilinogen deaminase =

HMBS
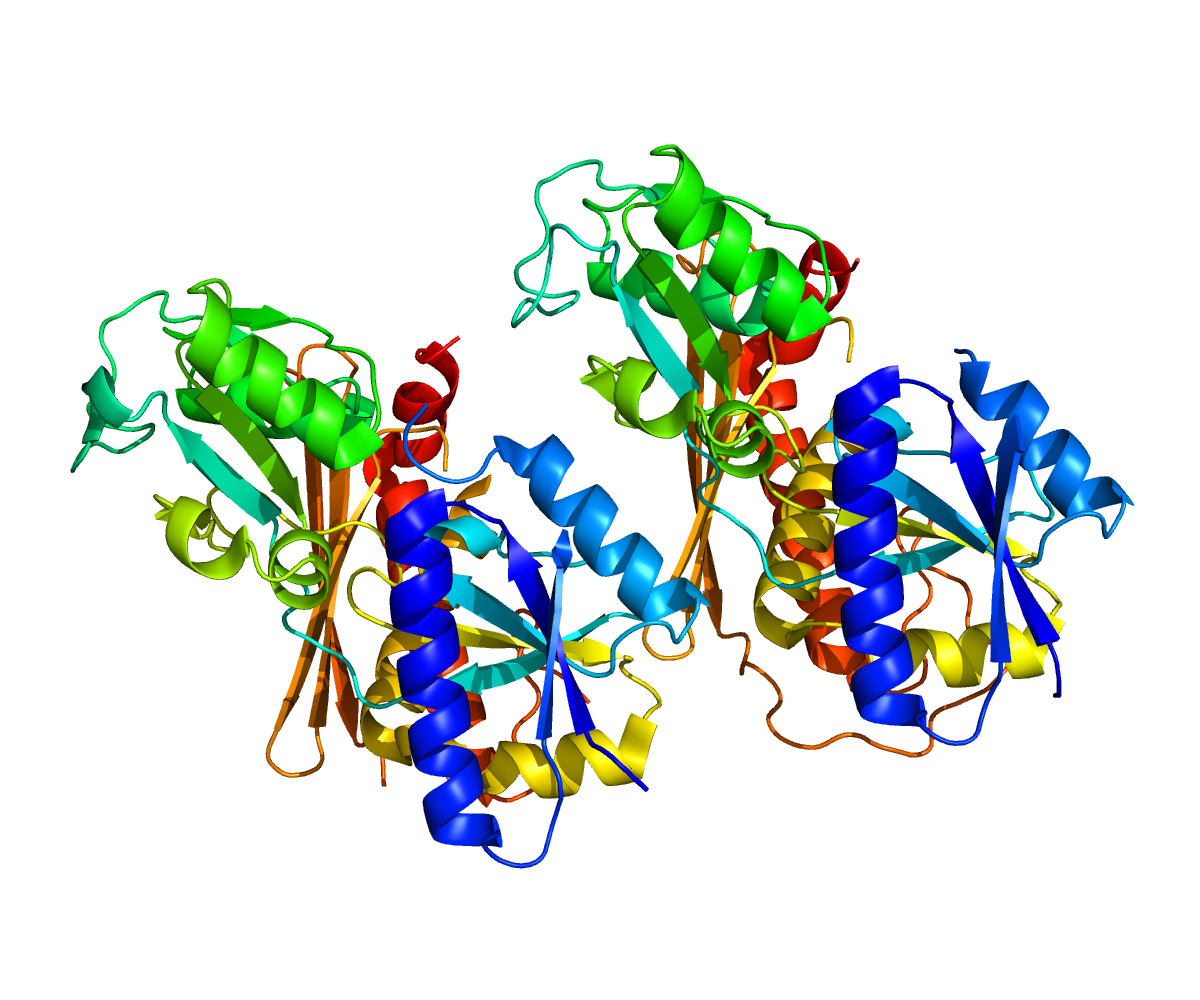

Identifiers
- Aliases: HMBS, PBG-D, PBGD, PORC, UPS, hydroxymethylbilane synthase
- External IDs: OMIM: 609806; MGI: 96112; GeneCards: HMBS
Available structures
PDB	Ortholog search: PDBe RCSB
PDB	List of PDB id codes 3ECR, 3EQ1
Enzyme activity
EC #	BRENDA	ExPASy	KEGG	MetaCyc
2.5.1.61	↗	↗	↗	↗

Gene location (Human)
Chr.	Chromosome 11 (human)
Band	11q23.3	Start	119,084,866 bp
Band	11q23.3	End	119,093,834 bp

Gene location (Mouse)
Chr.	Chromosome 9 (mouse)
Band	9 A5.2|9 24.84 cM	Start	44,247,636 bp
Band	9 A5.2|9 24.84 cM	End	44,255,525 bp
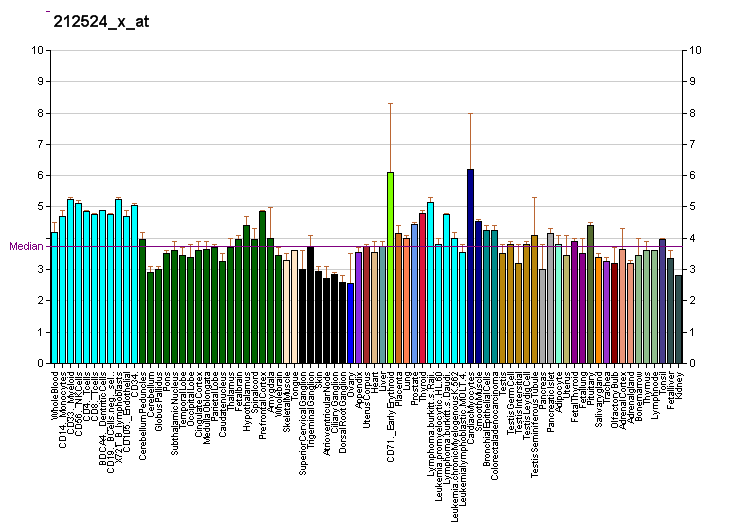

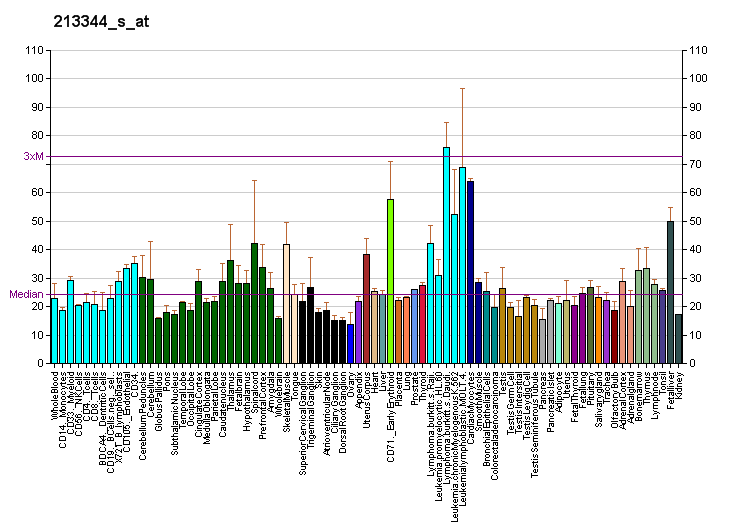

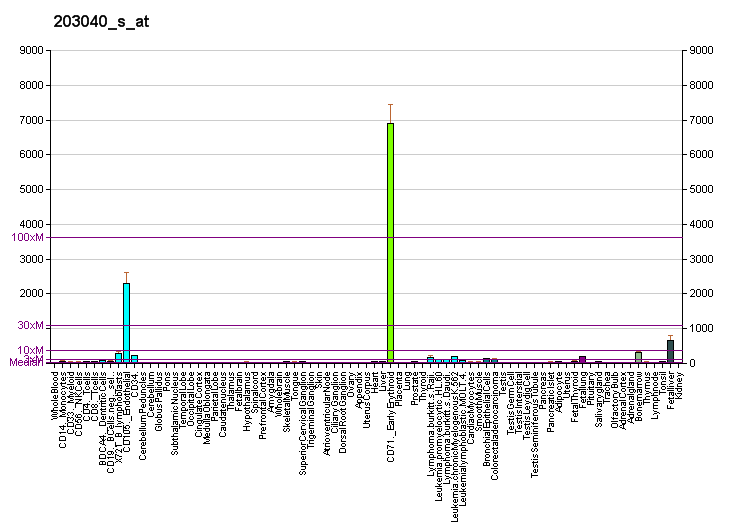
RNA expression pattern
Bgee	Human / Mouse (ortholog); Top expressed in: trabecular bone; bone marrow; bone marrow cell; mucosa of transverse colon; gonad; muscle of thigh; apex of heart; gastrocnemius muscle; right lobe of liver; rectum / Top expressed in: fetal liver hematopoietic progenitor cell; tibiofemoral joint; human fetus; spleen; body of femur; endocardial cushion; yolk sac; abdominal wall; right kidney; left lobe of liver; More reference expression data
BioGPS	More reference expression data
Gene ontology
Molecular function	transferase activity; hydroxymethylbilane synthase activity
Cellular component	cytosol; cytoplasm
Biological process	protoporphyrinogen IX biosynthetic process; tetrapyrrole biosynthetic process; porphyrin-containing compound biosynthetic process; peptidyl-pyrromethane cofactor linkage; heme biosynthetic process
Sources:Amigo / QuickGO
Orthologs
Databases	NCBI: entry; OMA: entry
Species	Human	Mouse
Entrez	3145	15288
Ensembl	ENSG00000256269	ENSMUSG00000032126
UniProt	P08397	P22907
RefSeq (mRNA)	NM_000190; NM_001024382; NM_001258208; NM_001258209	NM_001110251; NM_013551
RefSeq (protein)	NP_000181; NP_001019553; NP_001245137; NP_001245138	NP_001103721; NP_038579
Location (UCSC)	Chr 11: 119.08 – 119.09 Mb	Chr 9: 44.25 – 44.26 Mb
PubMed search
- Wikidata
View/Edit Human	View/Edit Mouse

Porphobilinogen deaminase (hydroxymethylbilane synthase, or uroporphyrinogen I synthase) is an enzyme (EC 2.5.1.61) that in humans is encoded by the HMBS gene. Porphobilinogen deaminase is involved in the third step of the heme biosynthetic pathway. It catalyzes the head to tail condensation of four porphobilinogen molecules into the linear hydroxymethylbilane while releasing four ammonia molecules:

== Structure and function ==
Functionally, porphobilinogen deaminase catalyzes the loss of ammonia from the porphobilinogen monomer (deamination) and its subsequent polymerization to a linear tetrapyrrole, which is released as hydroxymethylbilane in the overall reaction:

4
porphobilinogen
H_{2}O
4 NH_{3}
hydroxymethylbilane

The structure of 40-42 kDa porphobilinogen deaminase, which is highly conserved amongst organisms, consists of three domains. Domains 1 and 2 are structurally very similar: each consisting of five beta-sheets and three alpha helices in humans. Domain 3 is positioned between the other two and has a flattened beta-sheet geometry. A dipyrrole, a cofactor of this enzyme consisting of two condensed porphobilinogen molecules, is covalently attached to domain 3 and extends into the active site, the cleft between domains 1 and 2. Several positively charged arginine residues, positioned to face the active site from domains 1 and 2, have been shown to stabilize the carboxylate functionalities on the incoming porphobilinogen as well as the growing pyrrole chain. These structural features presumably favor the formation of the final hydroxymethylbilane product. Porphobilinogen deaminase usually exists in dimer units in the cytoplasm of the cell.

== Reaction mechanism ==
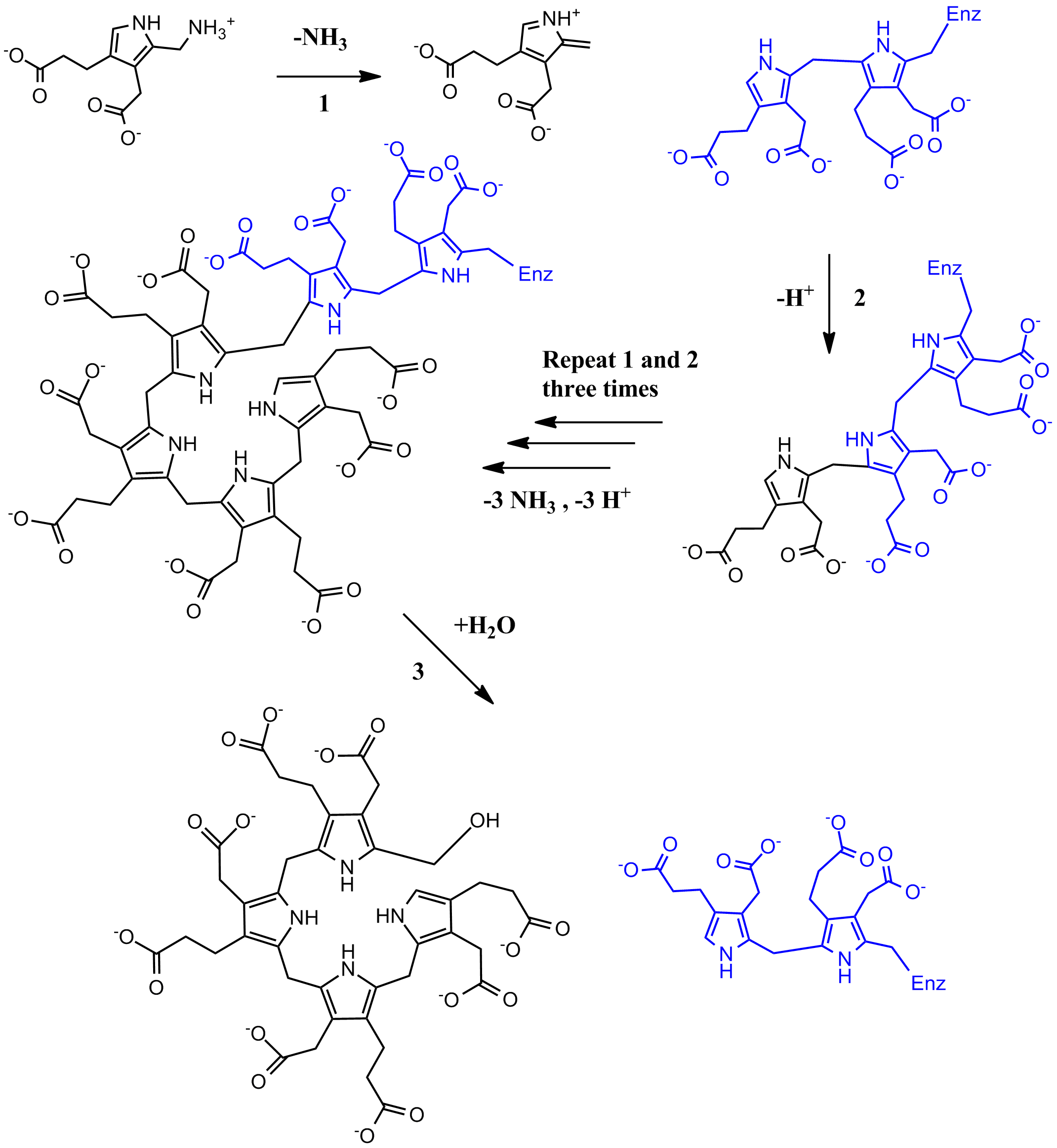
Full PBG Deaminase Mechanism

The first step is believed to involve an E1 elimination of ammonia from porphobilinogen, generating a carbocation intermediate (1). This intermediate is then attacked by the dipyrrole cofactor of porphobilinogen deaminase, which after losing a proton yields a trimer covalently bound to the enzyme (2). This intermediate is then open to further reaction with porphobilinogen (1 and 2 repeated three more times). Once a hexamer is formed, hydrolysis allows hydroxymethylbilane to be released, as well as cofactor regeneration (3).

== Pathology ==
The most well-known health issue involving porphobilinogen deaminase is acute intermittent porphyria, an autosomal dominant genetic disorder where insufficient hydroxymethylbilane is produced, leading to a build-up of porphobilinogen in the cytoplasm. This is caused by a gene mutation that, in 90% of cases, causes decreased amounts of enzyme. However, mutations where less-active enzymes and/or different isoforms have been described. At least 115 disease-causing mutations in this gene have been discovered.
