= Uroporphyrinogen III decarboxylase =

Mammalian protein found in humans

UROD
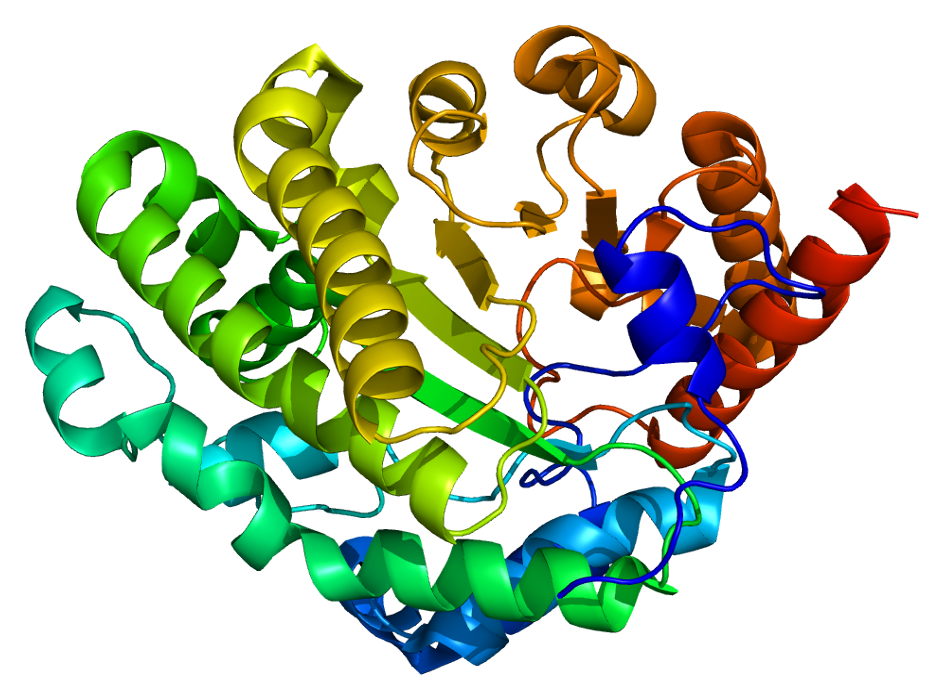

Identifiers
- Aliases: UROD, PCT, UPD, uroporphyrinogen decarboxylase
- External IDs: OMIM: 613521; MGI: 98916; GeneCards: UROD
Available structures
| PDB | Ortholog search: PDBe RCSB |
| PDB | List of PDB id codes 1JPH, 1JPI, 1JPK, 1R3Q, 1R3R, 1R3S, 1R3T, 1R3V, 1R3W, 1R3Y, 1URO, 2Q6Z, 2Q71, 3GVQ, 3GVR, 3GVV, 3GVW, 3GW0, 3GW3 |
Enzyme activity
| EC # | BRENDA | ExPASy | KEGG | MetaCyc |
|---|---|---|---|---|
| 4.1.1.37 | ↗ | ↗ | ↗ | ↗ |

Gene location (Human)
| Chr. | Chromosome 1 (human) |
| Band | 1p34.1 | Start | 45,010,950 bp |
| Band | 1p34.1 | End | 45,015,575 bp |

Gene location (Mouse)
| Chr. | Chromosome 4 (mouse) |
| Band | 4 D1|4 53.41 cM | Start | 116,847,162 bp |
| Band | 4 D1|4 53.41 cM | End | 116,851,610 bp |
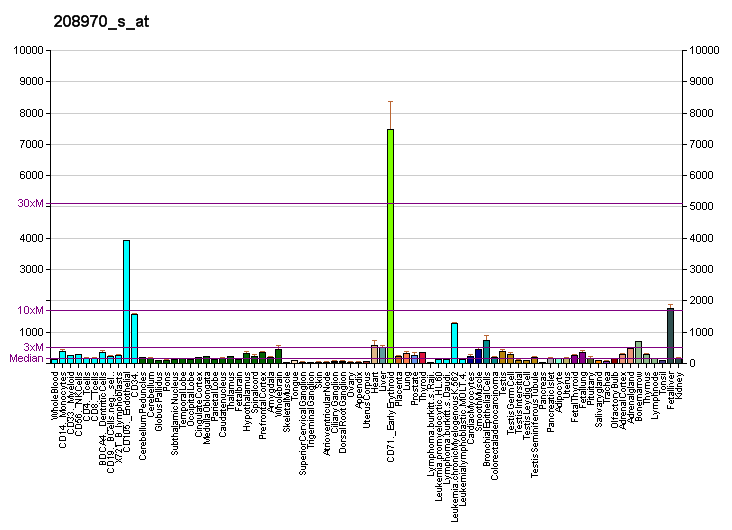

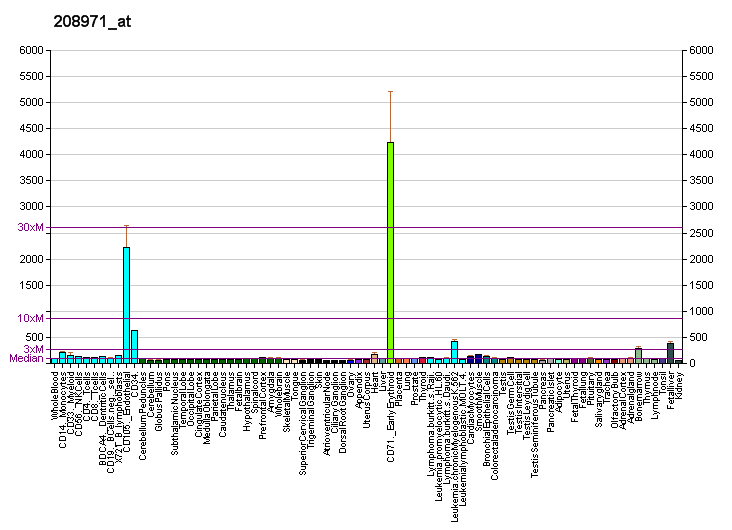
RNA expression pattern
| Bgee | Human / Mouse (ortholog); Top expressed in: trabecular bone; parotid gland; right adrenal gland; right adrenal cortex; parietal pleura; left adrenal cortex; endothelial cell; middle temporal gyrus; Brodmann area 23; bone marrow / Top expressed in: fetal liver hematopoietic progenitor cell; internal carotid artery; endocardial cushion; human fetus; external carotid artery; facial motor nucleus; atrioventricular valve; Epithelium of choroid plexus; medullary collecting duct; renal corpuscle; More reference expression data |
| BioGPS | More reference expression data |
Gene ontology
| Molecular function | protein binding; lyase activity; uroporphyrinogen decarboxylase activity; carboxy-lyase activity |
| Cellular component | nucleoplasm; cytoplasm; cytosol |
| Biological process | protoporphyrinogen IX biosynthetic process; porphyrin-containing compound biosynthetic process; heme biosynthetic process; heme metabolic process |
Sources:Amigo / QuickGO
Orthologs
| Databases | NCBI: entry; OMA: entry |
| Species | Human | Mouse |
| Entrez | 7389 | 22275 |
| Ensembl | ENSG00000126088 | ENSMUSG00000028684 |
| UniProt | P06132 | P70697 |
| RefSeq (mRNA) | NM_000374 | NM_009478 |
| RefSeq (protein) | NP_000365 | NP_033504 |
| Location (UCSC) | Chr 1: 45.01 – 45.02 Mb | Chr 4: 116.85 – 116.85 Mb |
| PubMed search |
- Wikidata
| View/Edit Human | View/Edit Mouse |

Uroporphyrinogen III decarboxylase (uroporphyrinogen decarboxylase, or UROD) is an enzyme (EC 4.1.1.37) that in humans is encoded by the UROD gene.

== Function ==
Uroporphyrinogen III decarboxylase is a homodimeric enzyme (PDB: 1URO) that catalyzes the fifth step in heme biosynthesis, which corresponds to the elimination of carboxyl groups from the four acetate side chains of uroporphyrinogen III to yield coproporphyrinogen III:

uroporphyrinogen III
4 CO_{2}
coproporphyrinogen III

== Clinical significance ==
Mutations and deficiency in this enzyme are known to cause familial porphyria cutanea tarda and hepatoerythropoietic porphyria. At least 65 disease-causing mutations in this gene have been discovered.

== Mechanism ==
At low substrate concentrations, the reaction is believed to follow an ordered route, with the sequential removal of CO_{2} from the D, A, B, and C rings, whereas at higher substrate/enzyme levels a random route seems to be operative. The enzyme functions as a dimer in solution, and both the enzymes from human and tobacco have been crystallized and solved at good resolutions.

The reaction catalyzed by UroD

UroD is regarded as an unusual decarboxylase, since it performs decarboxylations without the intervention of any cofactors, unlike the vast majority of decarboxylases. Its mechanism has been proposed to proceed through substrate protonation by an arginine residue. A 2008 report demonstrated that the uncatalyzed rate for UroD's reaction is 10^{−19}/s, so at pH 10 the rate acceleration of UroD relative to the uncatalyzed rate, i.e. catalytic proficiency, is the largest for any enzyme known, 6 × 10^{24}/M.

Proposed reaction mechanism of uroporphyrinogen III decarboxylase
