= Uroporphyrinogen III synthase =

Class of enzymes

UROS

Identifiers
- Aliases: UROS, UROIIIS, uroporphyrinogen III synthase
- External IDs: OMIM: 606938; MGI: 98917; GeneCards: UROS
Available structures
PDB	Ortholog search: PDBe RCSB
PDB	List of PDB id codes 1JR2
Enzyme activity
EC #	BRENDA	ExPASy	KEGG	MetaCyc
4.2.1.75	↗	↗	↗	↗

Gene location (Human)
Chr.	Chromosome 10 (human)
Band	10q26.2	Start	125,784,980 bp
Band	10q26.2	End	125,823,258 bp

Gene location (Mouse)
Chr.	Chromosome 7 (mouse)
Band	7 F3|7 77.26 cM	Start	133,287,972 bp
Band	7 F3|7 77.26 cM	End	133,311,801 bp
RNA expression pattern
Bgee	Human / Mouse (ortholog); Top expressed in: nucleus accumbens; caudate nucleus; amygdala; right frontal lobe; putamen; cingulate gyrus; anterior cingulate cortex; apex of heart; prefrontal cortex; dorsolateral prefrontal cortex / Top expressed in: fetal liver hematopoietic progenitor cell; tibiofemoral joint; right kidney; right ventricle; proximal tubule; interventricular septum; spleen; brown adipose tissue; human fetus; temporal muscle; More reference expression data
BioGPS	n/a
Gene ontology
Molecular function	lyase activity; uroporphyrinogen-III synthase activity
Cellular component	cytosol; mitochondrion
Biological process	tetrapyrrole biosynthetic process; cellular response to amine stimulus; response to antibiotic; heme biosynthetic process; protoporphyrinogen IX biosynthetic process; uroporphyrinogen III biosynthetic process; cellular response to arsenic-containing substance; porphyrin-containing compound biosynthetic process; response to platinum ion
Sources:Amigo / QuickGO
Orthologs
Databases	NCBI: entry; OMA: entry
Species	Human	Mouse
Entrez	7390	22276
Ensembl	ENSG00000188690	ENSMUSG00000030979
UniProt	P10746; Q5T3L9	P51163
RefSeq (mRNA)	NM_000375; NM_001324036; NM_001324037; NM_001324038; NM_001324039	NM_001302085; NM_001302086; NM_001302087; NM_009479; NM_001360164
RefSeq (protein)	NP_000366; NP_001310965; NP_001310966; NP_001310967; NP_001310968	NP_001289014; NP_001289015; NP_001289016; NP_033505; NP_001347093
Location (UCSC)	Chr 10: 125.78 – 125.82 Mb	Chr 7: 133.29 – 133.31 Mb
PubMed search
- Wikidata
View/Edit Human	View/Edit Mouse

Uroporphyrinogen-III synthase
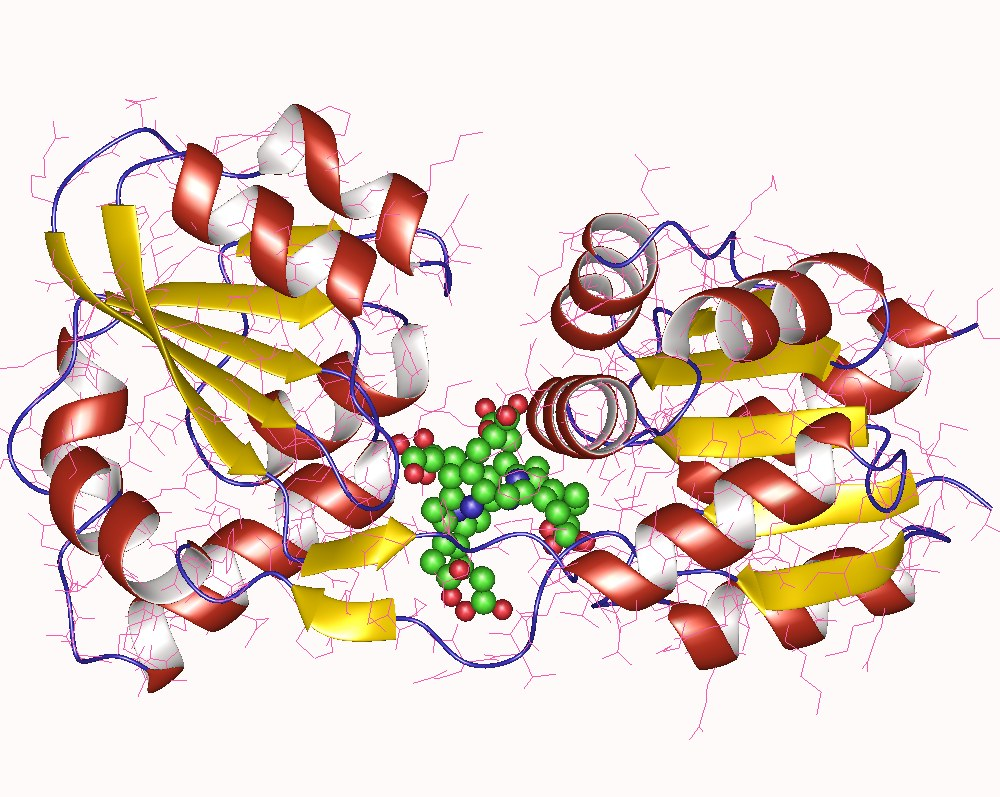
- Uroporphyrinogen-III synthase monomer, Thermus thermophilus

Identifiers
- EC no.: 4.2.1.75
- CAS no.: 37340-55-9

Databases
- BRENDA: enzyme data
- ExPASy: NiceZyme view
- KEGG: enzyme entry
- MetaCyc: metabolic pathway
- Rhea: reactions
- PDB structures: RCSB PDB PDBe PDBsum
- Gene Ontology: AmiGO / QuickGO
Search
- PMC: articles
- PubMed: articles
- NCBI: proteins

Uroporphyrinogen-III synthase HemD
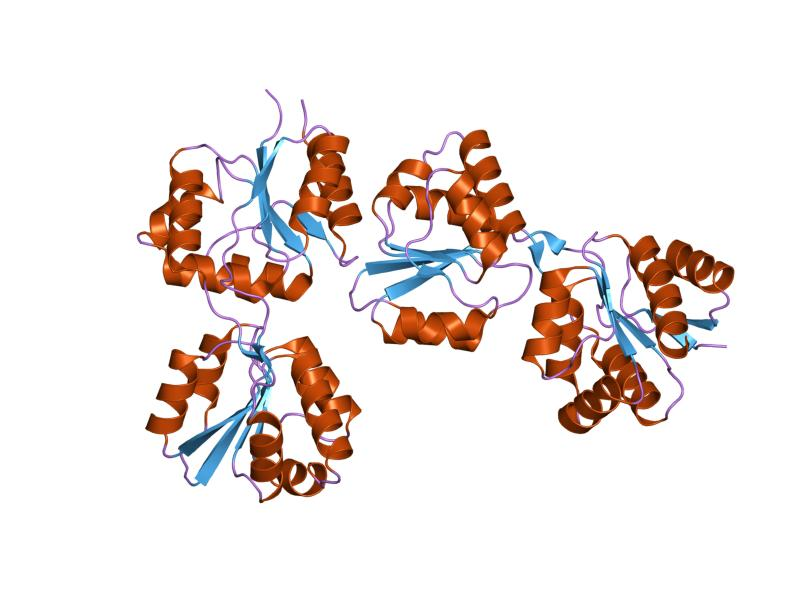
- crystal structure of uroporphyrinogen iii synthase from an extremely thermophilic bacterium thermus thermophilus hb8 (wild type, native, form-2 crystal)

Identifiers
- Symbol: HEM4
- Pfam: PF02602
- InterPro: IPR003754
- SCOP2: 1jr2 / SCOPe / SUPFAM
Available protein structures:
- PDB: IPR003754 PF02602 (ECOD; PDBsum)
- AlphaFold: IPR003754; PF02602

Uroporphyrinogen III synthase (EC 4.2.1.75) is an enzyme involved in the metabolism of the cyclic tetrapyrrole compound porphyrin. It is involved in the conversion of hydroxymethylbilane into uroporphyrinogen III. This enzyme catalyses the inversion of the final pyrrole unit (ring D) of the linear tetrapyrrole molecule, linking it to the first pyrrole unit (ring A), thereby generating a large macrocyclic structure, uroporphyrinogen III. The enzyme folds into two alpha/beta domains connected by a beta-ladder, the active site being located between the two domains.

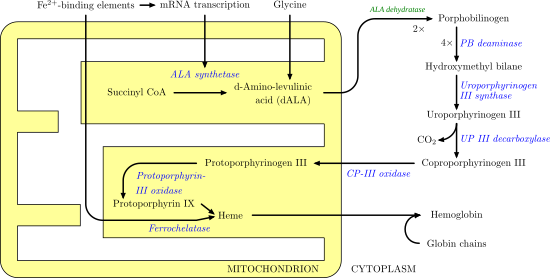
Heme synthesis—note that some reactions occur in the cytoplasm and some in the mitochondrion (yellow)

== Function ==
The enzyme catalyses the cyclisation reaction of hydroxymethylbilane into uroporphyrinogen III via a spiro intermediate which allows one of the pyrrole rings to convert its initial acetate to propionate configuration into a propionate-acetate one.

hydroxymethylbilane
H_{2}O
H_{2}O
uroporphyrinogen III

== Pathology ==
A deficiency is associated with Gunther's disease, also known as congenital erythropoietic porphyria (CEP). This is an autosomal recessive inborn error of metabolism that results from the markedly deficient activity of uroporphyrinogen III synthase.
