= C8H8O =

The molecular formula C_{8}H_{8}O (molar mass: 120.15 g/mol, exact mass: 120.057515 u) may refer to:

- Acetophenone
- Methylbenzaldehydes
  - 2-Methylbenzaldehyde
  - 3-Methylbenzaldehyde
  - 4-Methylbenzaldehyde
- Oxonine
- Phenylacetaldehyde
- Phthalane
- Styrene oxide
- 4-Vinylphenol
