= Coproporphyrinogens =

Coproporphyrinogens are tetrapyrroles with four propionic acid groups and an equal number of substituted methyls.

Coproporphyrinogen III is the most common variance. In the metabolism of porphyrin, it is formed from uroporphyrinogen III by the enzyme uroporphyrinogen III decarboxylase, and it is converted into protoporphyrinogen IX by coproporphyrinogen III oxidase.
