= C6H9NO2 =

The molecular formula C_{6}H_{9}NO_{2} (molar mass: 127.14 g/mol, exact mass: 127.0633 u) may refer to:

- γ-Acetylenic-GABA
- Baikiain
- 2,5-Bis(hydroxymethyl)pyrrole
- Guvacine
- Isoguvacine
