= Coproporphyrinogen dehydrogenase =

coproporphyrinogen dehydrogenase

Identifiers
- EC no.: 1.3.98.3

Databases
- IntEnz: IntEnz view
- BRENDA: BRENDA entry
- ExPASy: NiceZyme view
- KEGG: KEGG entry
- MetaCyc: metabolic pathway
- PRIAM: profile
- PDB structures: RCSB PDB PDBe PDBsum
- Gene Ontology: AmiGO / QuickGO
Search
- PMC: articles
- PubMed: articles
- NCBI: proteins

In enzymology, coproporphyrinogen dehydrogenase (EC 1.3.98.3) is an enzyme that catalyzes the chemical reaction

coproporphyrinogen III
+ 2 SAM
2 CO_{2}
protoporphyrinogen IX
+ 2 methionine
+ 2 5'-deoxyadenosine

The two substrates of this enzyme are coproporphyrinogen III and S-adenosyl methionine (SAM). Its products are protoporphyrinogen IX, carbon dioxide, methionine, and 5'-deoxyadenosine. It is an example of a radical SAM enzyme.

This enzyme belongs to the family of oxidoreductases, specifically those acting on the CH-CH group of donor with other acceptors. The systematic name of this enzyme class is coproporphyrinogen-III:S-adenosyl-L-methionine oxidoreductase (decarboxylating). Other names in common use include oxygen-independent coproporphyrinogen-III oxidase, HemF, HemN, radical SAM enzyme, and coproporphyrinogen III oxidase. This enzyme participates in the biosynthesis of porphyrins and chlorophyll. HemN is the oxygen-independent oxidase produced in Escherichia coli. HemF is the oxygen-dependent oxidase within E. coli. Importantly, only HemN utilizes S-adenosyl methionine. Human variants of Coproporphyrinogen oxidase are cofactor-independent.

== See also ==
- Coproporphyrinogen III oxidase, which catalyses the same reaction but using oxygen as oxidant
