= Porphyrinogen =

Hexahydroporphine, the core of porphyrinogens.

In biochemistry, a porphyrinogen is a member of a class of naturally occurring compounds with a tetrapyrrole core, a macrocycle of four pyrrole rings connected by four methylene bridges. They can be viewed as derived from the parent compound hexahydroporphine by the substitution of various functional groups for hydrogen atoms in the outermost (20-carbon) ring.

Porphyrinogens are intermediates in the biosynthesis of porphyrins, cofactors with a porphine core which are found in many enzymes and proteins including myoglobin, hemoglobin, cytochromes, and chlorophylls.

Porphyrins differ from porphyrinogens by having the four pyrrole rings linked by methine bridges =CH− instead of methylene bridges −CH_{2}−, and by lacking the hydrogen atom in two of the four amine −NH− groups, turning them into imines =N−. In the biosynthesis of porphyrins, the parent porphyrinogen is dehydrogenated by protoporphyrinogen oxidase.

Because of their limited delocalization, porphyrinogens are colorless. Loss of all four central hydrogen atoms in the core yields a tetravalent anion that can act as a ligand to metal cations, creating a coordination compound. Subsequent biosynthetic intermediates en route to porphyrins are deeply colored and often phytotoxic.

== Natural porphyrinogens ==
Porphyrogens that occur in living organisms usually have sidechains replacing some or all of the hydrogen atoms in two outermost carbon atoms of each pyrrole ring (as opposed to the hydrogen atoms in the methylene bridges).

Uroporphyrinogen III, precursor to coproporphyrinogen III.

Coproporphyrinogen III, precursor to protoporphyrinogen IX.

Protoporphyrinogen IX, precursor to protoporphyrin IX.

== Non-natural porphyrinogens ==
A variety of synthetic porphyrinogens have been produced and studied in laboratories. These often have side groups that do not occur in nature, and possibly at the carbons in the methylene bridges (meso positions) instead of the pyrrole rings. The Meso-substituted porphyrinogens are intermediates in the so-called Lindsey synthesis of meso-substituted porphyrins. Oxidation turns the central hexahydroporphine core into a porphine core, yielding the desired porphyrin.

Under acid catalysis, pyrrole and ketones R−(C=O)−R' or aldehydes R−(C=O)−H condense to give many oligomers, including the cyclic ones [−(CRR')−(C_{4}H_{2}NH)−]_{n}\. The desired porphyrinogens (n = 4) can then be separated. Meso-substituted porphyrinogens with eight non-hydrogen side chains are also called calix[4]pyrroles. These products resist dehydrogenation of the outer ring better than the natural porphyrinogens.

For example, condensation with benzaldehyde C_{6}H_{5}−(C=O)−H yields meso-tetraphenylporphyrinogen, which can be oxidized to meso-tetraphenylporphyrin. Condensation with acetone H_{3}C−(C=O)−CH_{3} yields meso-octamethyporphyrinogen.

Alternatively, pyrrole with sidechains substituted at carbons 3 and 4 (those not adjacent to the nitrogen) can be condensed with formaldehyde H−(C=O)−H to give porphyrinogens that more closely resemble the natural ones. For example, with 3,4-diethylpyrrole one obtains octaethylporphyrinogen, parent of octaethylporphyrin.

meso-Octamethylporphyrinogen.
