= Parent structure =

Chemical structure from which derivatives can be visualized

In chemistry, a parent structure is the structure of an unadorned ion or molecule from which derivatives can be visualized. Parent structures underpin systematic nomenclature and facilitate classification. Fundamental parent structures have one or no functional groups and often have various types of symmetry. Benzene (C_{6}H_{6}) is a chemical itself consisting of a hexagonal ring of carbon atoms with a hydrogen atom attached to each, and is the parent of many derivatives that have substituent atoms or groups replacing one or more of the hydrogens. Some parents are rare or nonexistent themselves, as in the case of porphine, though many simple and complex derivatives are known.

Benzene and derivatives

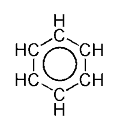
Benzene is the parent.

Toluene is a derivative of benzene.
Porphyrins

Porphine is the parent of porphyrins.

Protoporphyrin IX is a natural derivative of the parent porphine.

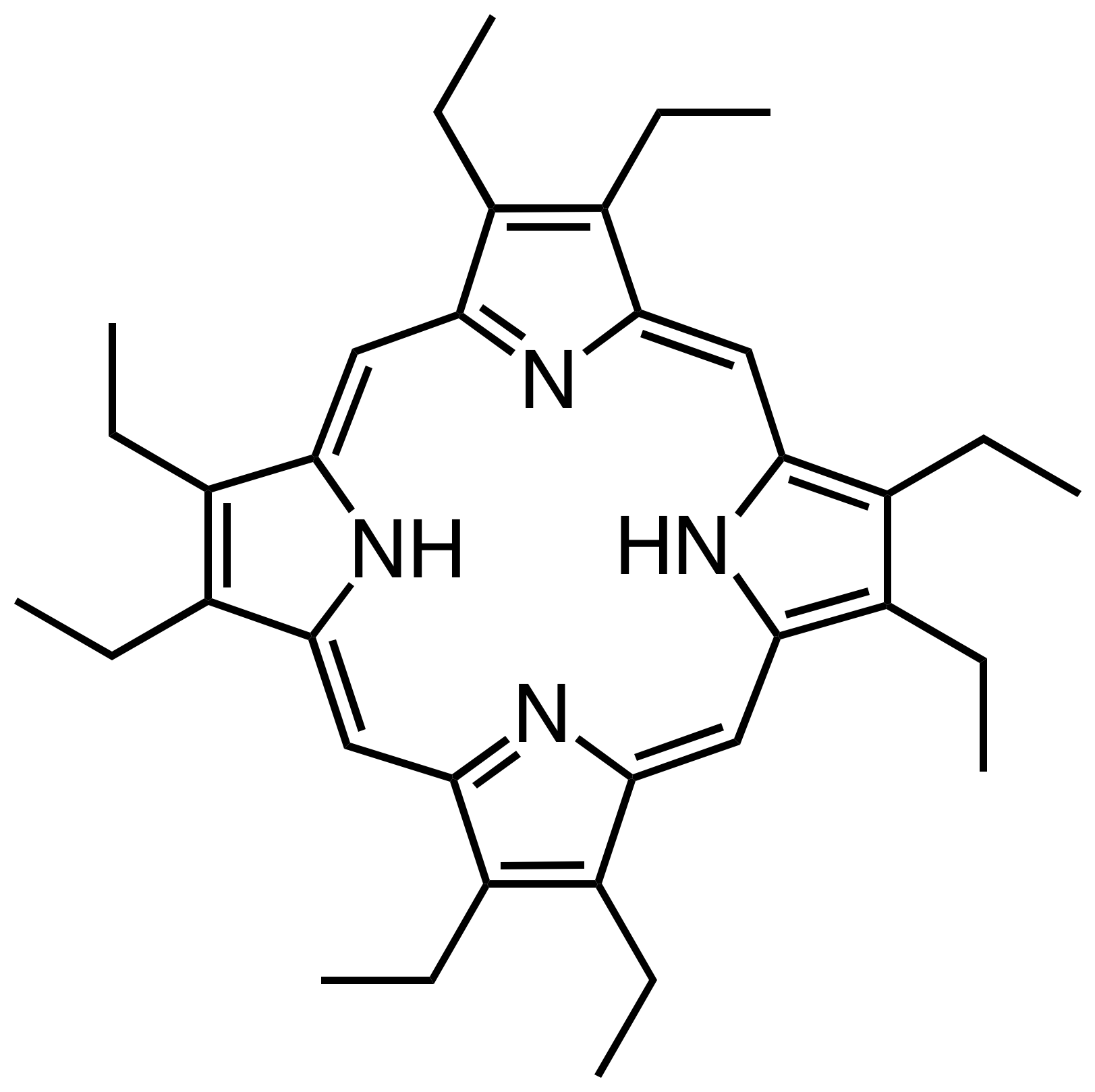
Octaethylporphyrin is a synthetic derivative of the parent porphine.

== IUPAC definitions ==
According to the International Union of Pure and Applied Chemistry, the concept of parent structure is closely related to or identical to parent compound, parent name, or simply parent.

=== Organic parents ===
These species consist of an unbranched chain of skeletal atoms, or consisting of an unsubstituted monocyclic or polycyclic ring system. Parent structures bearing one or more functional groups that are not specifically denoted by a suffix are called functional parents. Names of parent structures are used in IUPAC nomenclature as basis for systematic names.

=== Hydride parents ===
A parent hydride is a parent structure with one or more hydrogen atoms. Parent hydrides have a defined standard population of hydrogen atoms attached to a skeletal structure. Parent hydrides are used extensively in organic nomenclature, but are also used in inorganic chemistry.

Phosphines

Phosphine is the parent of phosphines.

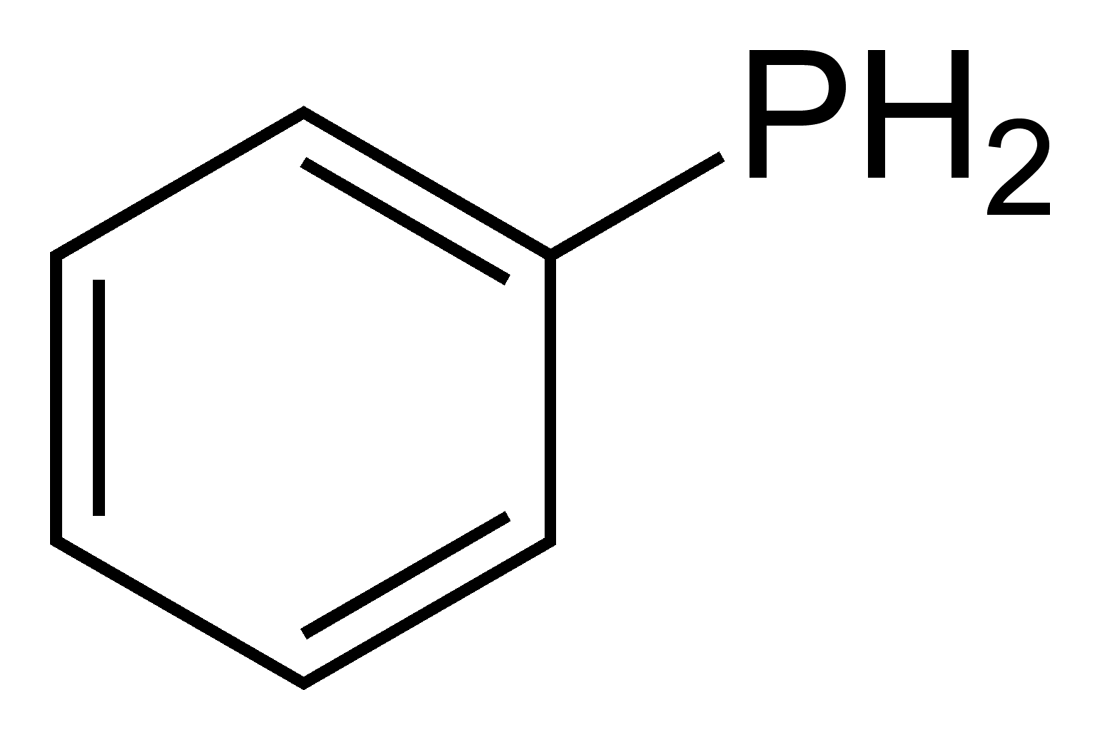
Phenylphosphine is a derivative of the parent phosphine.

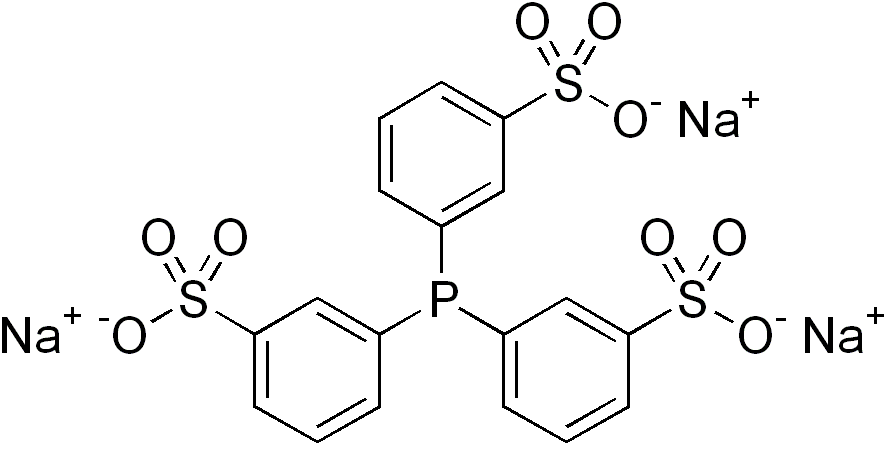
3,3′,3′′-Phosphanetriyltris(benzenesulfonic acid) trisodium salt is a derivative of the parent phosphine.

== See also ==
- Hydride
- Preferred IUPAC name
