= Rothemund =

Rothemund is a surname. Notable persons with that surname include:

- Helmut Rothemund (1929–2004), German politician
- Marc Rothemund (born 1968), German film director
- Paul W. K. Rothemund (born late 20th century), American scientist
- Paul Rothemund (chemist, born 1904), American chemist
- Sigi Rothemund (1944-2024), German film director
- Yvonne Rothemund (born 1992), German ice hockey player
