= Iron(tetraphenylporphyrinato) chloride =

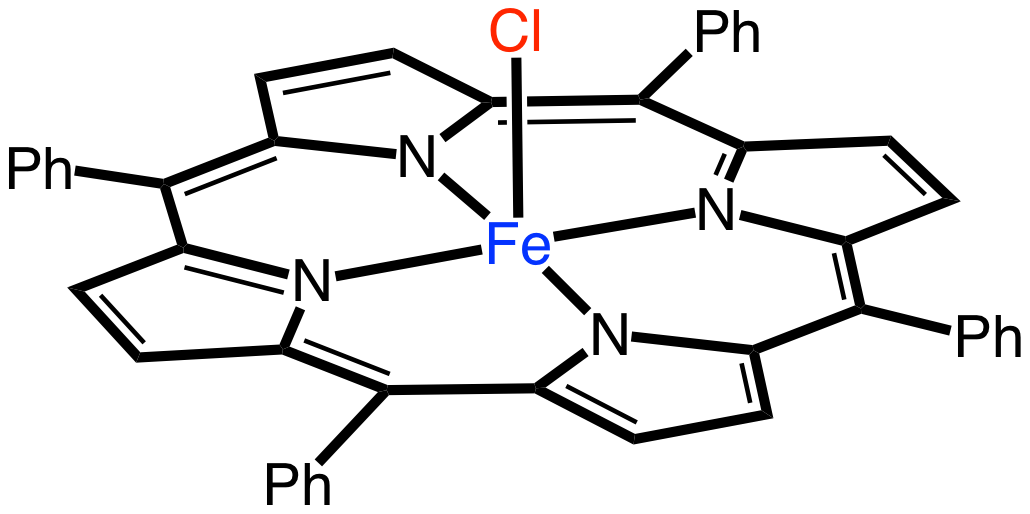

Names
- Other names fecl(tpp)

Identifiers
CAS Number	16456-81-8
3D model (JSmol)	Interactive image
ChemSpider	21171533
- InChI: InChI=1S/C44H28N4.ClH.Fe/c1-5-13-29(14-6-1)41-33-21-23-35(45-33)42(30-15-7-2-8-16-30)37-25-27-39(47-37)44(32-19-11-4-12-20-32)40-28-26-38(48-40)43(31-17-9-3-10-18-31)36-24-22-34(41)46-36;;/h1-28H;1H;/q-2;;+3/p-1/b41-33-,41-34-,42-35-,42-37-,43-36-,43-38-,44-39-,44-40-;; Key: ZDYSAMCSFRQDMN-YKKPBKTHSA-M
- SMILES: c1ccc(cc1)/c/2c\3/nc(/c(c/4\n5/c(c(\c6n/c(c(\c7n(c2cc7)[Fe]5Cl)/c8ccccc8)/C=C6)/c9ccccc9)/cc4)/c1ccccc1)C=C3

Properties
Chemical formula	C_{44}H_{28}ClFeN_{4}
Molar mass	704.03 g·mol^{−1}
Appearance	dark blue solid
Density	1.318 g/cm^{3}
- Except where otherwise noted, data are given for materials in their standard state (at 25 °C [77 °F], 100 kPa). Infobox references

Iron(tetraporphyrinato) chloride is the coordination complex with the formula Fe(TPP)Cl where TPP is the dianion [C_{44}H_{28}N_{4}]^{2-}. The compound forms blue microcrystals that dissolve in chlorinated solvent to give brown solutions. In terms of structure, the complex is five-coordinate with idealized C_{4v} point group symmetry. It is one of more common transition metal porphyrin complexes.

== Synthesis and reactions ==
Fe(TPP)Cl is prepared by the reaction of tetraphenylporphyrin (H_{2}TPP) and ferrous chloride in the presence of air:

H_{2}TPP + FeCl_{2} + 1/4 O_{2} → Fe(TPP)Cl + HCl + 1/2 H_{2}O

The chloride can be replaced with other halides and pseudohalides. Base gives the "mu-oxo dimer":

2 Fe(TPP)Cl + 2 NaOH → [Fe(TPP)]_{2}O + 2 NaCl + H_{2}O

Most relevant to catalysis, the complex is easily reduced to give ferrous derivatives (L = pyridine, imidazole):

Fe(TPP)Cl + e- + 2 L → Fe(TPP)L_{2} + Cl^{−}

The complex is widely studied as a catalyst.
