= Methylbenzaldehyde =

Methylbenzaldehyde or tolualdehyde may refer to:

- 2-Methylbenzaldehyde (2-tolualdehyde)
- 3-Methylbenzaldehyde (3-tolualdehyde)
- 4-Methylbenzaldehyde (4-tolualdehyde)
