= Aminolevulinate transaminase =

Identifiers
- EC no.: 2.6.1.43
- CAS no.: 9012-46-8

Databases
- IntEnz: IntEnz view
- BRENDA: BRENDA entry
- ExPASy: NiceZyme view
- KEGG: KEGG entry
- MetaCyc: metabolic pathway
- PRIAM: profile
- PDB structures: RCSB PDB PDBe PDBsum
- Gene Ontology: AmiGO / QuickGO
Search
- PMC: articles
- PubMed: articles
- NCBI: proteins

Aminolevulinate transaminase (EC 2.6.1.43) is a pyridoxal phosphate-dependent enzyme that catalyzes the reversible chemical reaction

aminolevulinic acid
+
pyruvic acid
4,5-dioxopentanoic acid
+
alanine

The two substrates of this enzyme characterised from Rhodopseudomonas spheroides are aminolevulinic acid and pyruvic acid. Its products are 4,5-dioxopentanoic acid and L-alanine. Although aminolevulinic acid is an intermediate in the pathway to heme, via protoporphyrinogen IX, the main biosynthetic pathway to it in Rhodopseudomonas spheroides is via glycine and succinyl coenzyme A.

This enzyme is a transferase, specifically a transaminase, which transfer nitrogenous groups. The systematic name of this enzyme class is 5-aminolevulinate:pyruvate aminotransferase. Other names in common use include aminolevulinate aminotransferase, gamma,delta-dioxovalerate, aminotransferase, gamma,delta-dioxovaleric acid transaminase, 4,5-dioxovalerate aminotransferase, 4,5-dioxovaleric acid transaminase, 4,5-dioxovaleric transaminase, 5-aminolevulinic acid transaminase, alanine-gamma,delta-dioxovalerate aminotransferase, alanine-dioxovalerate aminotransferase, alanine:4,5-dioxovalerate aminotransferase, aminolevulinic acid transaminase, dioxovalerate transaminase, L-alanine-4,5-dioxovalerate aminotransferase, L-alanine:4,5-dioxovaleric acid transaminase, L-alanine:dioxovalerate transaminase, DOVA transaminase, and 4,5-dioxovaleric acid aminotransferase.
