= Hereditary coproporphyria =

- Coproporphyrinogen III
- Specialty: Endocrinology

Hereditary coproporphyria (HCP) is a disorder of heme biosynthesis, classified as an acute hepatic porphyria. HCP is caused by a deficiency of the enzyme coproporphyrinogen oxidase, coded for by the CPOX gene, and is inherited in an autosomal dominant fashion, although homozygous individuals have been identified. Unlike acute intermittent porphyria, individuals with HCP can present with cutaneous findings similar to those found in porphyria cutanea tarda in addition to the acute attacks of abdominal pain, vomiting and neurological dysfunction characteristic of acute porphyrias. Like other porphyrias, attacks of HCP can be induced by certain drugs, environmental stressors or diet changes. Biochemical and molecular testing can be used to narrow down the diagnosis of a porphyria and identify the specific genetic defect. Overall, porphyrias are rare diseases. The combined incidence for all forms of the disease has been estimated at 1:20,000. The exact incidence of HCP is difficult to determine, due to its reduced penetrance.

== Signs and symptoms ==
Clinically, patients affected with HCP present similarly to those with other acute porphyrias, such as acute intermittent porphyria (AIP) and variegate porphyria (VP). Patients with HCP and VP can present with symptoms shared between the acute and cutaneous porphyrias. This includes the acute attacks of abdominal pain, nausea, vomiting, diarrhea, tachycardia, hypertension and seizures, as well as the cutaneous findings seen in porphyria cutanea tarda (PCT), namely increased skin fragility, bullous lesions after exposure to sunlight and increased scarring.

Individuals with HCP may be asymptomatic in the absence of triggering factors. Common triggers include certain drugs, alcohol, hormonal changes, and dietary changes. Sunlight and other ultraviolet light can trigger the skin manifestations. Homozygous individuals for CPOX mutations can present with these findings at an earlier age than heterozygotes.

== Genetics ==
HCP is caused by mutations in CPOX, which codes for the enzyme coproporphyrinogen oxidase. This enzyme is responsible for the sixth step in the heme biosynthetic pathway, converting coproporphyrinogen III to protoporphyrinogen IX. CPOX is located at 3q11.2-q12.1, has 6 introns and 7 exons and produces an mRNA strand that is 2675 bases in length. It is inherited in an autosomal dominant fashion, meaning that a deficiency of 50% of the normal enzyme activity is enough to cause symptoms. As reproductive fitness is not impacted, homozygous affected individuals have been reported. Along with other acute porphyrias HCP demonstrates reduced penetrance, meaning not all individuals who carry a disease-causing mutation will express symptoms.

Individuals who are homozygous for a specific mutation (K404E) or compound heterozygous with a null allele in CPOX have a more severe erythropoietic porphyria, harderoporphyria, characterized by neonatal jaundice, hyperbilirubinemia, hepatosplenomegaly and skin lesions upon exposure to ultraviolet light. HCP is a rare disease, but the exact incidence is difficult to determine due to the reduced penetrance of the acute porphyrias. Overall, the incidence of all porphyrias is estimated at 1:20,000 in the United States. The incidence of harderoporphyria is even lower, with less than 10 cases reported worldwide.

== Diagnosis ==
The diagnosis of any porphyria is often delayed due to the rarity of the disease as well as the varied and non-specific findings that patients present with. Bedside measurement of urine porphobilinogen is recommended as a screening test for patients suspected of having an acute porphyria. Elevated porphobilinogen is indicative of an acute porphyria, and additional testing can be done to narrow down the specific type.

The identification of a specific porphyria is based on the results of laboratory findings, including blood, urine and stool tests. HCP can be distinguished from most other acute porphyrias by the cutaneous findings. VP presents similarly, but can be distinguished based on urine and stool porphyrin analysis, typically done using high performance liquid chromatography with fluorescence detection. The results of biochemical testing for porphyrias are most informative when samples are collected during an acute attack. Typically, the distinguishing metabolite for HCP and VP is the presence of protoporphyrin in the plasma and feces of individuals affected with VP.

Elevated coproporphyrin is a common finding in urine, known as coproporphyrinuria as it is the predominant porphyrin species in urine. This is a non-specific finding that is not necessarily due to an acute porphyria. Coproporphyrinuria can be caused by other stressors to the heme biosynthetic pathway, such as liver disease, lead poisoning and certain bone marrow disorders.

== Treatment ==
There is no cure for HCP caused by the deficient activity of coproporphyrinogen oxidase. Treatment of the acute symptoms of HCP is the same as for other acute porphyrias. Intravenous hemin (as heme arginate or hematin) is the recommended therapy for acute attacks. Acute attacks can be severe enough to cause death if not treated quickly and correctly. Hospitalization is typically required for administration of hemin, and appropriate drug selection is key to avoid exacerbating symptoms with drugs that interact poorly with porphyrias. Proper drug selection is most difficult when it comes to treatment of the seizures that can accompany HCP, as most anti-seizure medications can make the symptoms worse. Gabapentin and levetiracetam are two anti-seizure drugs that are thought to be safe.

In patients where management of symptoms is difficult even with hemin, liver transplant is an option before the symptoms have progressed to advanced paralysis. Combined liver and kidney transplants are sometimes undertaken in people with kidney failure.

Long-term treatment of acute porphyrias is centered on the avoidance of acute attacks by eliminating precipitating factors, such as drugs, dietary changes, and infections. Females often have attacks coincident with their menstrual cycle, which can be managed effectively with hormonal birth control. Progesterone is a major hormonal trigger for Hereditary Coproporphyria and this should be noted when considering hormonal birth control.
