= Deborah Fygenson =

American biophysicist and academic

Deborah Kuchnir Fygenson
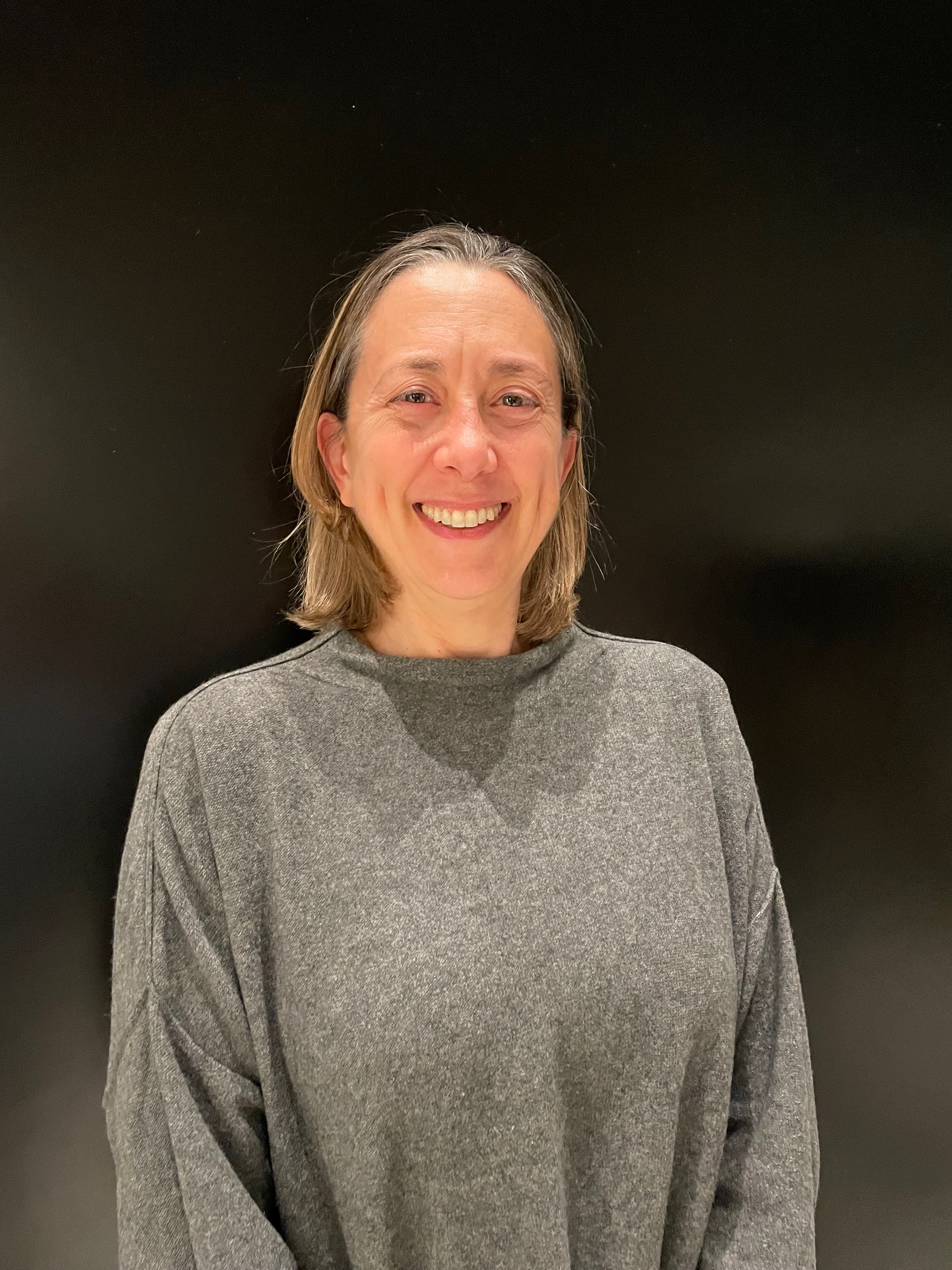
- Deborah Fygenson at the University of Chicago in 2026
- Education: Massachusetts Institute of Technology; Princeton University
- Scientific career
- Institutions: University of Southern California; Rockefeller University; University of California, Santa Barbara
- Thesis: Microtubules : the rhythm of assembly and the evolution of form (1995)

Deborah Kuchnir Fygenson is a professor of Physics at the University of California, Santa Barbara who specializes in the physics of soft biological matter. Her research aims to understand and control biomolecular self-assembly and to use this knowledge to (i) explore physical principles of molecular machinery, (ii) elucidate physical routes to the emergence of animate matter, and (iii) apply these for the advancement of science and technology (e.g., using DNA origami to position spin centres for quantum technologies). Her teaching focuses on making the lower-division laboratory experience of physics majors impart skills essential to experimental research.

== Early life and education ==
Fygenson is the child of two physicists. She earned her undergraduate degree at Massachusetts Institute of Technology, where she studied physics. Her undergraduate research used a Penning trap to make precision measurements. In 1989, she was awarded the American Physical Society Apker award in recognition of her undergraduate research. She moved to Princeton University for her doctoral studies, where she investigated microtubules. She was a postdoctoral researcher at the Rockefeller University Center for Study in Physics and Biology and University of Southern California.

== Research and career ==
Fygenson was appointed to the faculty at the University of California, Santa Barbara in 1998. She works in biological physics, where she explores the interactions of biomolecules (e.g. membranes or microtubules). She studies their mechanical properties and defines structure-property relationships, which can have implications for protein design and drug discovery.

Alongside biophysics, Fygenson is interested in using DNA to create spin arrays for quantum technologies. Her 2D and 3D DNA nanostructures can incorporate nitroxide or gadolinium spin labels, which can be assembled on a diamond surface. It is then possible to study interactions between the precisely positioned spins in the DNA and those in shallow NV centres.

Outside of the lab, Fygenson dedicates her time to educational outreach, including the "Girls Exploring Math and Science" (GEMS) program, Research Internships in Science and Engineering (RISE) program and Physics Circus.

== Selected publications ==
- Paul W K Rothemund; Axel Ekani-Nkodo; Nick Papadakis; Ashish Kumar; Deborah Kuchnir Fygenson; Erik Winfree (1 December 2004). "Design and characterization of programmable DNA nanotubes". Journal of the American Chemical Society. 126 (50): 16344–16352. doi:10.1021/JA044319L. ISSN 0002-7863. PMID 15600335. Wikidata Q34376646.
- Alberto Puliafito; Lars Hufnagel; Pierre Neveu; Sebastian Streichan; Alex Sigal; D Kuchnir Fygenson; Boris I Shraiman (6 January 2012). "Collective and single cell behavior in epithelial contact inhibition". Proceedings of the National Academy of Sciences of the United States of America. 109 (3): 739–744. arXiv:1112.0465. Bibcode:2012PNAS..109..739P. doi:10.1073/PNAS.1007809109. ISSN 0027-8424. PMC 3271933. PMID 22228306. Wikidata Q30504689.
- Travers H Anderson; Younjin Min; Kim L Weirich; Hongbo Zeng; Deborah Fygenson; Jacob N Israelachvili (1 June 2009). "Formation of supported bilayers on silica substrates". Langmuir. 25 (12): 6997–7005. doi:10.1021/LA900181C. ISSN 0743-7463. PMID 19354208. Wikidata Q46830502.

== Personal life ==
Fygenson lives in Goleta. She is married and has two daughters. Her parents Moyses and Franca Kuchnir were also important physicists.
