= CPOX =

CPOX may refer to:

- Coproporphyrinogen III oxidase
- Catalytic partial oxidation
