= Rothemund reaction =

Chemical condensation and oxidation process

Named after	Paul Wilhelm Karl Rothemund
Reaction type	Condensation reaction

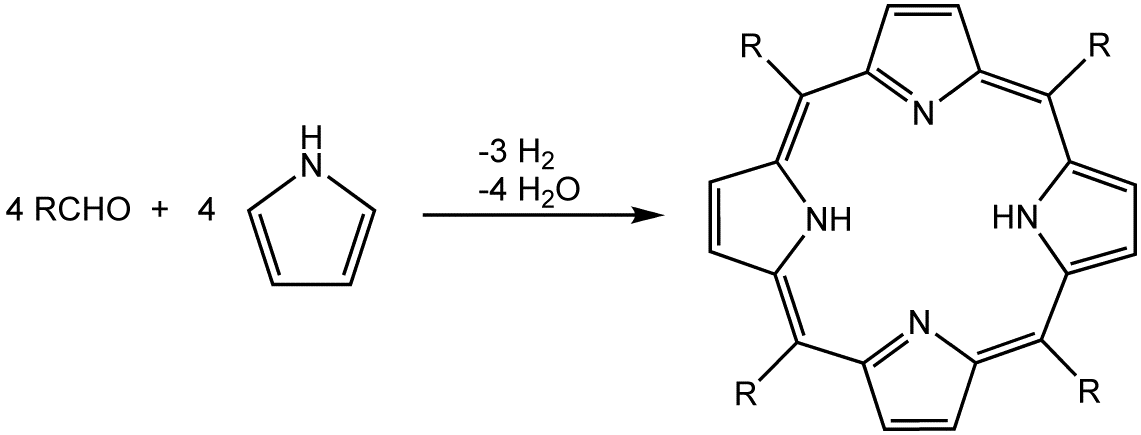
The Rothemund reaction

The Rothemund reaction is a condensation/oxidation process that converts four pyrroles and four aldehydes into a porphyrin. It is based on work by Paul Rothemund, who first reported it in 1936. The method underpins more modern synthesis such as those described by Adler and Longo and by Lindsey. The Rothemund reactions is common in university teaching labs.

== Method ==
The reaction employs an organic acidic medium such as acetic acid or propionic acid as typical reaction solvents. Alternatively p-toluenesulfonic acid or various Lewis acids can be used with chlorinated solvents. The aldehyde and pyrrole are heated in this medium to afford modest yields of the meso tetrasubstituted porphyrins [RCC_{4}H_{2}N]_{4}H_{2}. The reaction entails both condensation of the aldehydes with the 2,5-positions of the pyrrole but also oxidative dehydrogenation of the porphyrinogen [RCC_{4}H_{2}NH]_{4}.

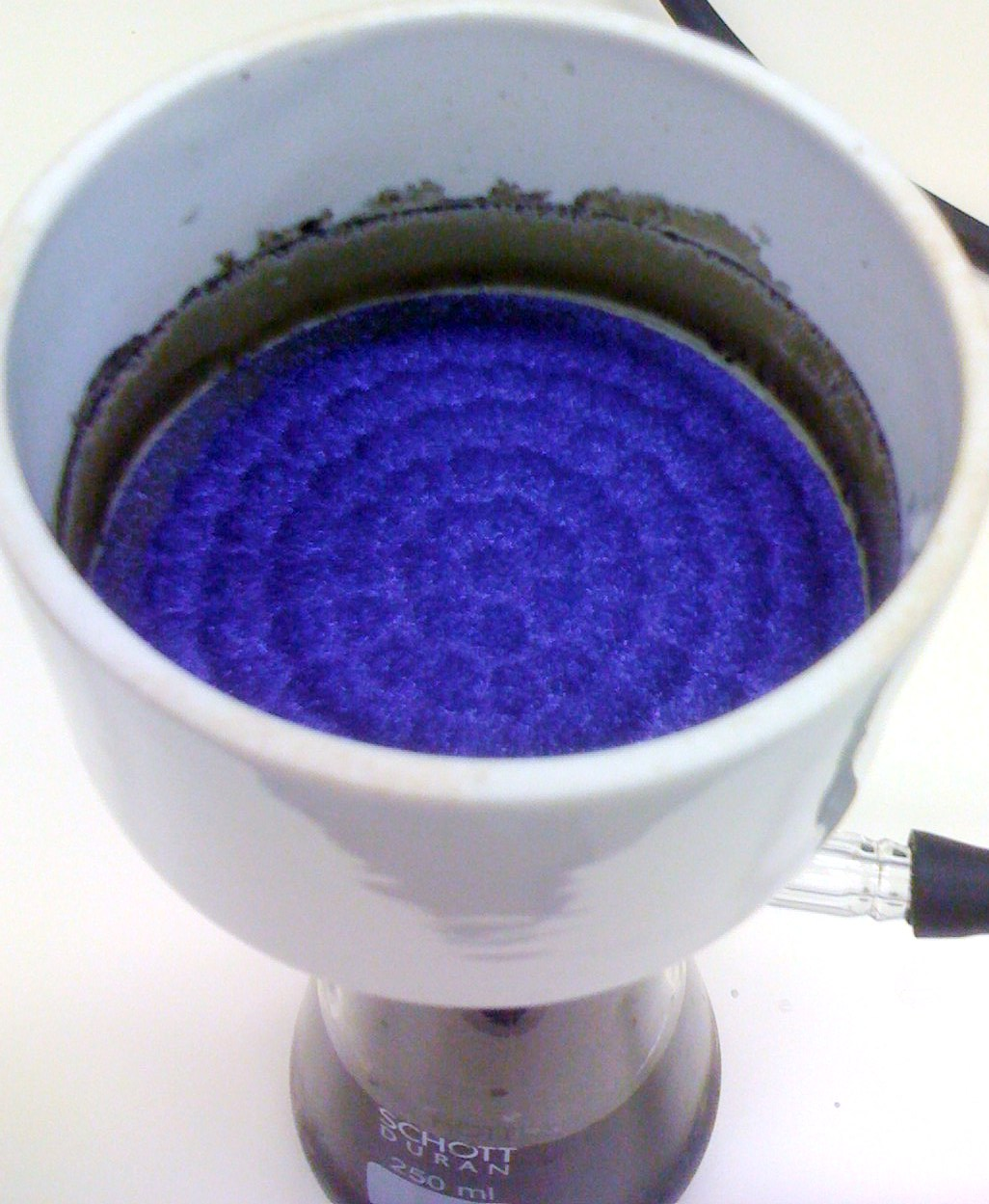
Brilliant crystals of meso-tetratolylporphyrin, prepared from 4-methylbenzaldehyde and pyrrole in refluxing propionic acid

== Reaction history ==
The multi-step syntheses of hemin and chlorophyll by Hans Fischer were awarded by a Nobel Prize in Chemistry. This has inspired the work of his student Paul Rothemund to develop a simple one pot synthesis of porphyrins. In 1935, Paul Rothemund reported the formation of porphyrin, from a simple reaction of pyrrole with gaseous acetaldehyde or formaldehyde in methanol followed by treatment with various concentrations of hydrochloric acid. One year later Paul Rothemund announced the applicability of his reaction to other aldehydes, by which he was able to explore large number of porphyrins. Here he detailed the synthesis of porphine, the fundamental ring system in all the porphyrins. He performed the porphin synthesis at a temperature of 90-95 °C and high pressure in sealed pyrex glass tubes, by reacting pyrrole, 2 % formaldehyde and pyridine in methanol for 30 hours.

A simplified version of Rothemund porphyrin synthesis was described by Alan D. Adler and Frederick R. Longo in 1966. It utilizes mild organic acids as catalysts and reaction medium and is conducted in open air. Seventy aldehydes gave corresponding meso-substituted porphyrins. The reaction time was shortened to 30 minutes and yields improved to 20%. The Alder-Logo reaction protocol was further modified by Lindsey et al. Using Lewis acid catalyst (boron trifluoride) or strong organic acids (trifluoroacetic acid) in chlorinated solvents, yields improved to 30-40%.

Green chemistry variants have been developed in which the reaction is performed with microwave irradiation using reactants adsorbed on acidic silica gel or at high temperature in the gas phase.
