= Protoporphyrinogen IX dehydrogenase (menaquinone) =

Identifiers
- EC no.: 1.3.5.3

Databases
- IntEnz: IntEnz view
- BRENDA: BRENDA entry
- ExPASy: NiceZyme view
- KEGG: KEGG entry
- MetaCyc: metabolic pathway
- PRIAM: profile
- PDB structures: RCSB PDB PDBe PDBsum
Search
- PMC: articles
- PubMed: articles
- NCBI: proteins

Protoporphyrinogen IX dehydrogenase (menaquinone) (EC 1.3.5.3, HemG) is an enzyme with systematic name protoporphyrinogen IX:menaquinone oxidoreductase. This enzyme catalyses the following chemical reaction

protoporphyrinogen IX
protoporphyrin IX

The enzyme uses three equivalents of menaquinone per molecule of protoporphyrinogen IX to provide the oxidant. It enables Escherichia coli to synthesize heme in both aerobic and anaerobic environments.
