= Transition metal porphyrin complexes =

Family of organometallic compounds

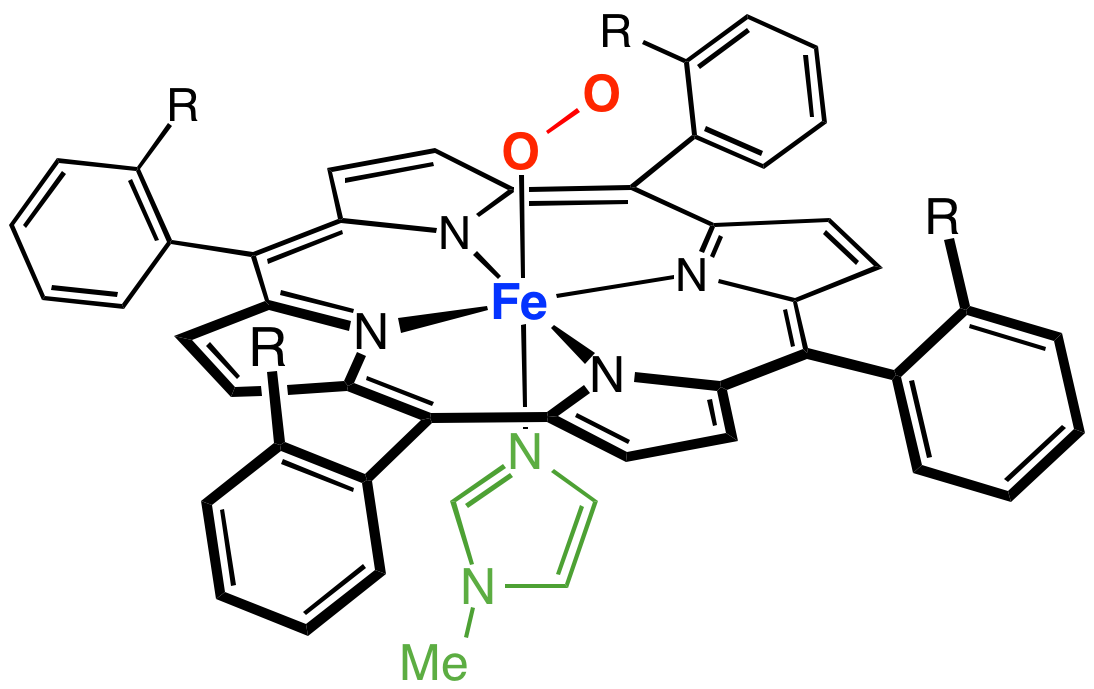
A picket-fence porphyrin complex of Fe, with axial coordination sites occupied by methylimidazole (green) and dioxygen (R = amide groups).

In organometallic chemistry, transition metal porphyrin complexes are a family of coordination complexes of the conjugate base of porphyrins. Iron porphyrin complexes occur widely in nature, which has stimulated extensive studies on related synthetic complexes. The metal-porphyrin interaction is a strong one such that metalloporphyrins are thermally robust. They are catalysts and exhibit rich optical properties, although these complexes remain mainly of academic interest.

== Structure ==
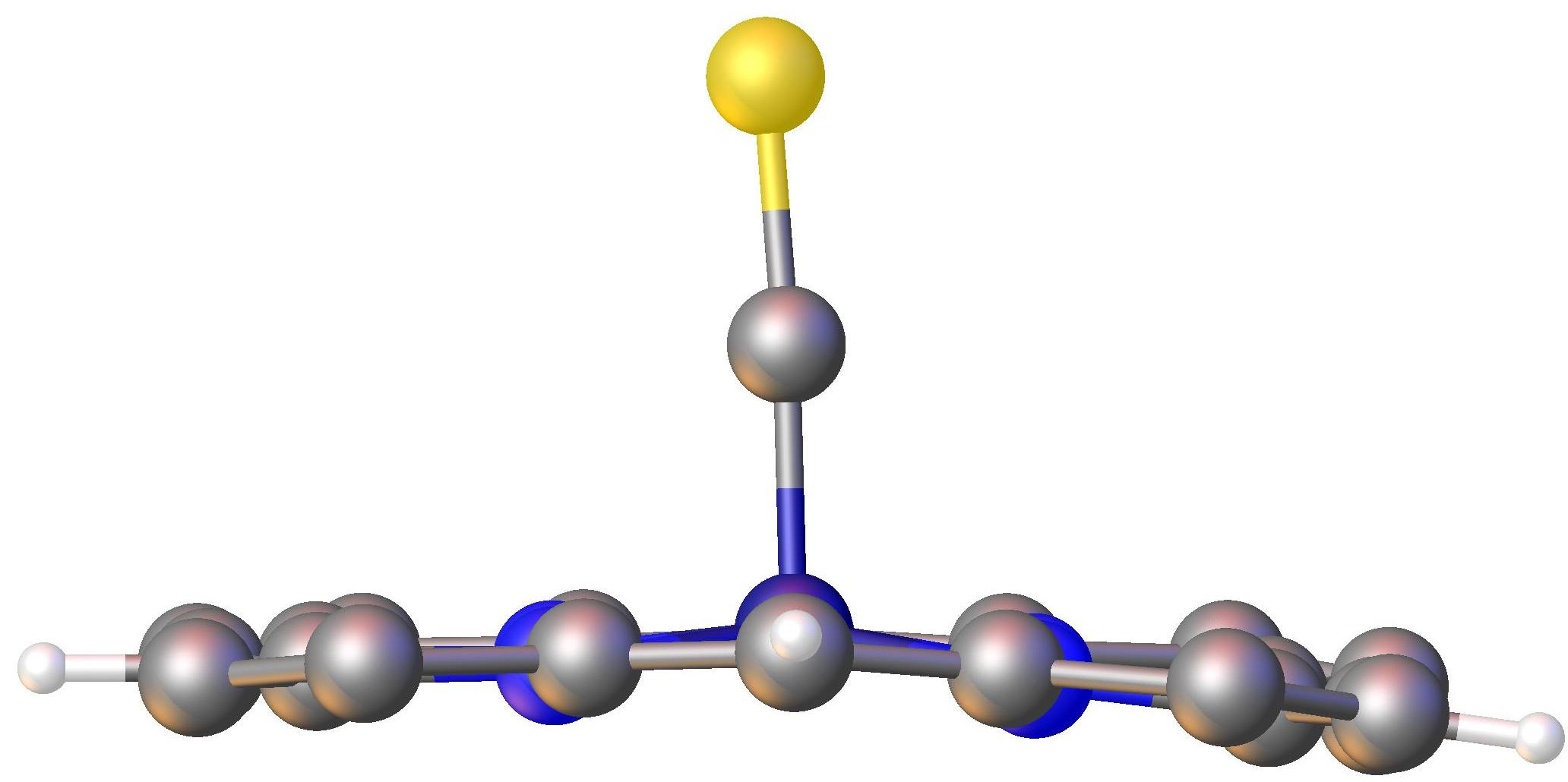
Side view of Fe(OEP)CS (ethyl groups removed for clarity), showing the highly planar nature of the porphyrin ring. In this case, Fe is elevated by 0.23 Å above the N4 plane. In the related Fe(OEP)CS(pyridine) complex, the FeN4 groups are coplanar.

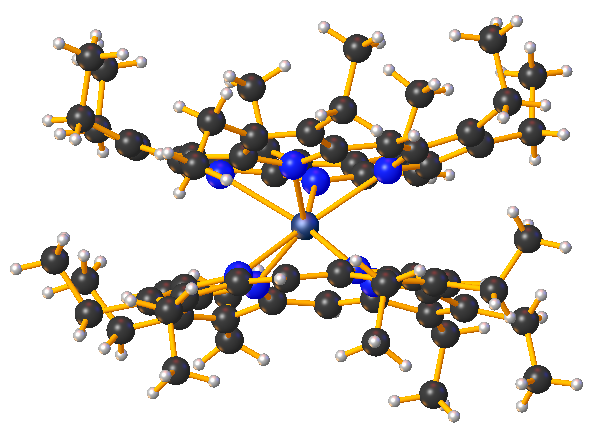
Chemical structure of the bis(porphyrin) complex Zr(OEP)_{2}.

Porphyrin complexes consist of a square planar MN_{4} core. The periphery of the porphyrins, consisting of sp^{2}-hybridized carbons, generally display only small deviations from planarity. Additionally, the metal is often not centered in the N_{4} plane.

Large metals such as zirconium, tantalum, and molybdenum tend to bind two porphyrin ligands. Some [M(OEP)]_{2} feature a multiple bonds between the metals.

== Formation ==
Metal porphyrin complexes are almost always prepared by direct reaction of a metal halide with the free porphyrin, abbreviated here as H_{2}P:

MCl_{x} + H_{2}P → M(P)Cl_{2−x} + 2 HCl

Two pyrrole protons are lost. The porphyrin dianion is an L_{2}X_{2} ligand.

These syntheses require somewhat forcing conditions, consistent with the tight fit of the metal in the N_{4}^{2-} "pocket." In nature, the insertion is mediated by chelatase enzymes. The insertion of a metal in synthetic porphyrins proceeds by the intermediacy of a "sitting atop complex" (SAC), whereby the entering metal interacts with only one or a two of the pyrrolic nitrogen centers.

In contrast to natural porphyrins, synthetic porphyrin ligands are typically symmetrical (i.e., their dianionic conjugate bases). Two major varieties are well studied, those with substituents at the meso positions, the premier example being tetraphenylporphyrin. These ligands are easy to prepare in one-pot procedures. A large number of aryl groups can be deployed aside from phenyl.

A second class of synthetic porphyrins have hydrogen at the meso positions. Octaethylporphyrin (H_{2}OEP) is the subject of many such studies. It is more expensive than tetraphenylporphyrin.

Protoporphyrin IX, which occurs naturally, can be modified by removal of the vinyl groups and esterification of the carboxylic acid groups to gives deuteroporphyin IX dimethyl ester.

== Biomimetic complexes ==
Protoporphyrin IX is the precursor to heme and closely related to chlorophyll.

Iron porphyrin complexes ("hemes") are the dominant metalloporphyrin complexes in nature. Consequently, synthetic iron porphyrin complexes are well investigated. Common derivatives are those of Fe(III) and Fe(II). Complexes of the type Fe(P)Cl are square-pyramidal and high spin with idealized C_{4v} symmetry. Base hydrolysis affords the "mu-oxo dimers" with the formula [Fe(P)]_{2}O. These complexes have been widely investigated as oxidation catalysts. Typical stoichiometries of ferrous porphyrins are Fe(P)L_{2} where L is a neutral ligand such as pyridine and imidazole. Cobalt(II) porphyrins behave similarly to the ferrous derivatives. They bind O_{2} to form dioxygen complexes.

=== Synthetic applications ===
Catalysts based on synthetic metalloporphyrins have been extensively investigated, although few or no applications exist. Due to their distinctive redox properties, Co(II)–porphyrin-based systems are radical initiators. Some complexes emulate the action of various heme enzymes such as cytochrome P450, lignin peroxidase. Metalloporphyrins are also studied as catalysts for water splitting, with the purpose of generating molecular hydrogen and oxygen for fuel cells.

In addition, porous organic polymers based on porphyrins, along with metal oxide nanoparticles,

=== Supramolecular chemistry ===
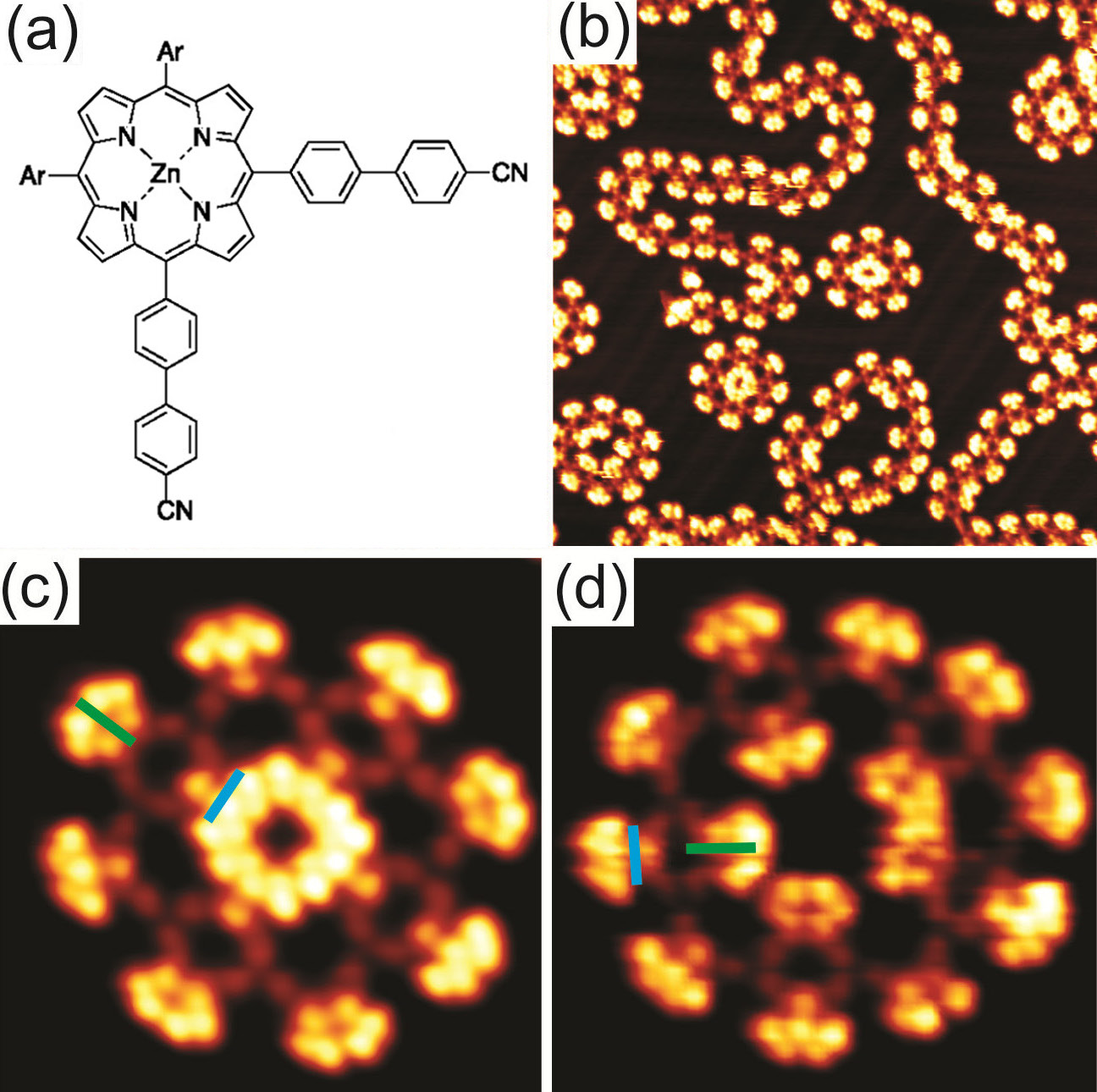
(a) An example structure of a porphyrin derivative molecule. (b) On a gold surface, deposition of Co induces the formation of flexible 1D porphyrin coordination polymers with defined chains and clusters. Each rosette cluster in (c-d) contains 4 or 5 molecules in the core and 8 or 10 molecules in the outer shells (STM images). Blue and green bars in (c-d) indicate two different structural isomers present within the rosette.

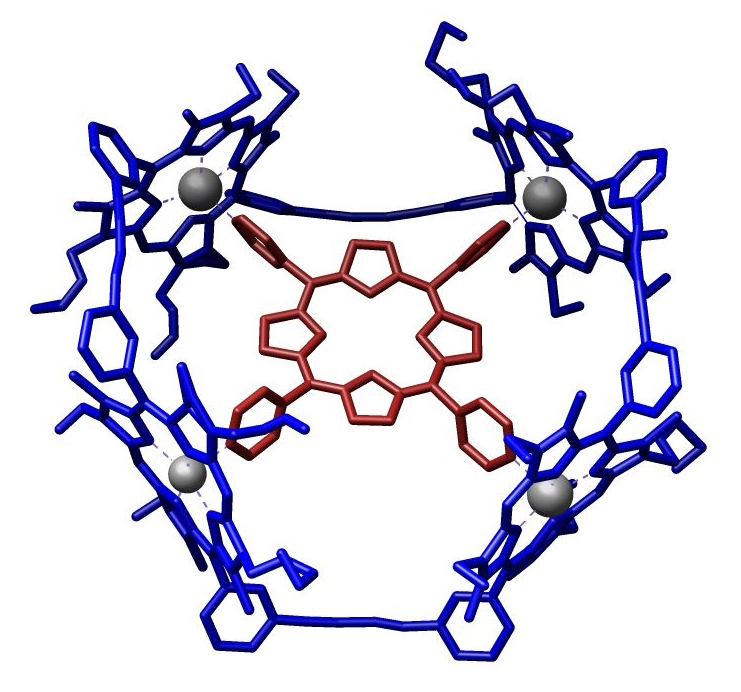
An example of porphyrins involved in host–guest chemistry. Here, a four-porphyrin–zinc complex hosts a porphyrin guest.

Porphyrins are often used to construct structures in supramolecular chemistry. These systems take advantage of the Lewis acidity of the metal, typically zinc. An example of a host–guest complex that was constructed from a macrocycle composed of four porphyrins. A guest-free base porphyrin is bound to the center by coordination with its four-pyridine substituents.

== See also ==
- phthalocyanines
- macrocyclic ligand
