= 2-Methylbenzaldehyde =

Names
- Preferred IUPAC name 2-Methylbenzaldehyde
- Other names o-Tolualdehyde

Identifiers
CAS Number	529-20-4
3D model (JSmol)	Interactive image
Beilstein Reference	605841
ChEBI	CHEBI:27434
ChEMBL	ChEMBL1487138
ChemSpider	21106524
ECHA InfoCard	100.007.685
EC Number	208-452-2
Gmelin Reference	3304
KEGG	C07214
PubChem CID	10722
UNII	Q7E5H6W6BG
CompTox Dashboard (EPA)	DTXSID1022051
- InChI: InChI=1S/C8H8O/c1-7-4-2-3-5-8(7)6-9/h2-6H,1H3 Key: BTFQKIATRPGRBS-UHFFFAOYSA-N
- SMILES: CC1=CC=CC=C1C=O

Properties
Chemical formula	C_{8}H_{8}O
Molar mass	120.151 g·mol^{−1}
Appearance	colorless liquid
Density	1.0328 g/cm^{3} (20 °C)
Melting point	−35 °C (−31 °F; 238 K)
Boiling point	199–200 °C (390–392 °F; 472–473 K)

Hazards
- GHS labelling
Pictograms	(GHS05: Corrosive) (GHS07: Exclamation mark)
Signal word	Danger
Hazard statements	H302, H314, H315, H319, H335
Precautionary statements	P260, P264, P270, P271, P280, P301+P312, P301+P330+P331, P302+P352, P303+P361+P353, P304+P340, P305+P351+P338, P310, P312, P321, P330, P332+P313, P337+P313, P362, P363, P403+P233, P405, P501
Flash point	67 °C; 153 °F; 340 K
- Except where otherwise noted, data are given for materials in their standard state (at 25 °C [77 °F], 100 kPa). Infobox references

2-Methylbenzaldehyde is an organic compound with the formula CH_{3}C_{6}H_{4}CHO. It is a colorless liquid.

== Use and occurrence ==
Of its many reactions, 2-methylbenzaldehyde undergoes BF_{3}-induced Rothemund condensation with pyrrole to give atropoisomers of tetrakis(o-tolyl)porphyrin.

It is one of main benzaldehyde component of automobile exhaust.

A laboratory use of o-Tolualdehyde could be in the synthesis of U-77863 & U-77864.

Ortetamine is the name of the amphetamine that is made from this benzaldehyde.

== Related compounds ==
- Benzaldehyde
- 4-Methylbenzaldehyde
- Salicylaldehyde
