= Meso-Octamethylporphyrinogen =

meso-Octamethylporphyrinogen

Names
- IUPAC name 5,5,10,10,15,15,20,20-octamethyl-21,22,23,24-tetrahydroporphyrin
- Other names acetonepyrrole, octamethylcalix[4]pyrrole

Identifiers
CAS Number	4475-42-7
3D model (JSmol)	Interactive image
Beilstein Reference	365398
ChEBI	CHEBI:51701
ChemSpider	550696
ECHA InfoCard	100.152.255
EC Number	623-589-1
Gmelin Reference	2142403
PubChem CID	634396
CompTox Dashboard (EPA)	DTXSID00348292
- InChI: InChI=1S/C28H36N4/c1-25(2)17-9-11-19(29-17)26(3,4)21-13-15-23(31-21)28(7,8)24-16-14-22(32-24)27(5,6)20-12-10-18(25)30-20/h9-16,29-32H,1-8H3 Key: XZCHDFOYWDLFEY-UHFFFAOYSA-N
- SMILES: CC1(C2=CC=C(N2)C(C3=CC=C(N3)C(C4=CC=C(N4)C(C5=CC=C1N5)(C)C)(C)C)(C)C)C

Properties
Chemical formula	C_{28}H_{36}N_{4}
Molar mass	428.624 g·mol^{−1}
Appearance	white solid

Hazards
- GHS labelling
Pictograms	(GHS07: Exclamation mark)
Signal word	Warning
Hazard statements	H315, H319, H335
Precautionary statements	P261, P264, P271, P280, P302+P352, P304+P340, P305+P351+P338, P312, P321, P332+P313, P337+P313, P362, P403+P233, P405, P501
- Except where otherwise noted, data are given for materials in their standard state (at 25 °C [77 °F], 100 kPa). Infobox references

meso-Octamethylporphyrinogen, usually referred to simply as octamethylporphyrinogen, is an organic compound with the formula (Me_{2}C-C_{4}H_{2}NH)_{4} (Me = CH_{3}. It is one of the simplest porphyrinogens, a family of compounds that occur as intermediates in the biosynthesis of hemes and chlorophylls. In contrast to those rings, porphyrinogens are colorless since they lack extended conjugation. The prefix meso-octamethyl indicates that the eight methyl groups are located on the carbon centers that interconnect the four pyrrole rings. Also unlike porphyrins, the porphyrinogens are highly ruffled.

== Preparation ==
The compound was first reported by Adolph Bayer. It is made by condensation of pyrrole with acetone.

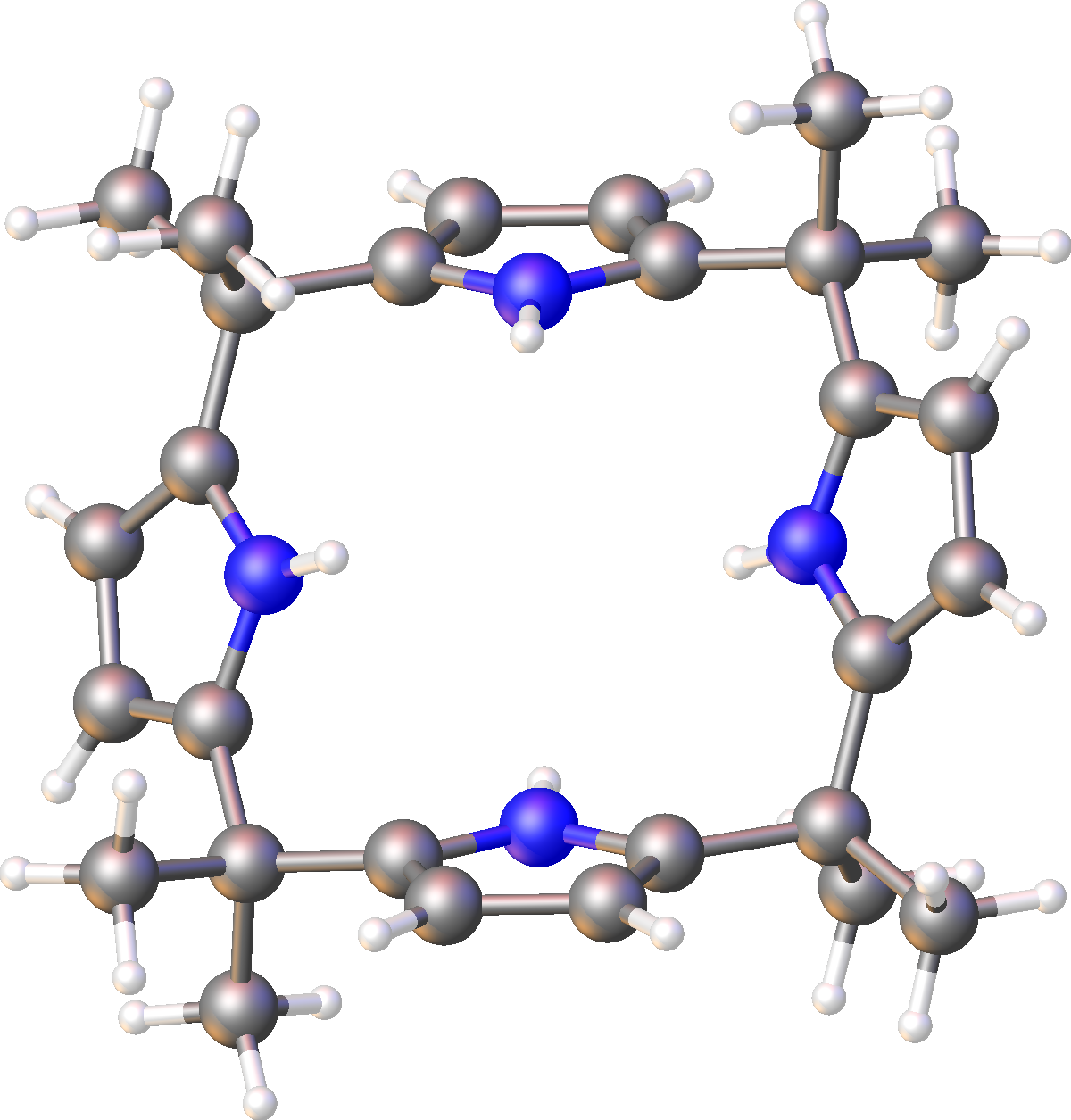
Structure of octamethylporphyrinogen.

== Reactions ==
The pyrrolic N-H centers of octamethylporphyrinogen can be deprotonated, and the resulting tetraanion functions as a tetradentate ligand for a variety of metal ions.
