= Daniel Mansuy =

French researcher and chemist (born 1945)

Daniel Mansuy is a French researcher and chemist born in 1945 in Châteauroux (Indre), a member of the French Academy of Sciences.

== Biography ==
Daniel Mansuy graduated from the École nationale supérieure de chimie de Paris (now Chimie Paris Tech) in 1967 and obtained a doctorate in science from the Université Pierre-et-Marie-Curie in 1970 under the supervision of Marc Julia. He then joined the CNRS as a research manager and then director of research in 1992. He was co-founder in 1984 and director (1984-1996 and 1999-2005) of the Laboratory of Pharmaceutical and Toxicological Chemistry and Biochemistry at Paris Descartes University. He is currently Director of Research Emeritus Outstanding Class.

== Scientific work ==
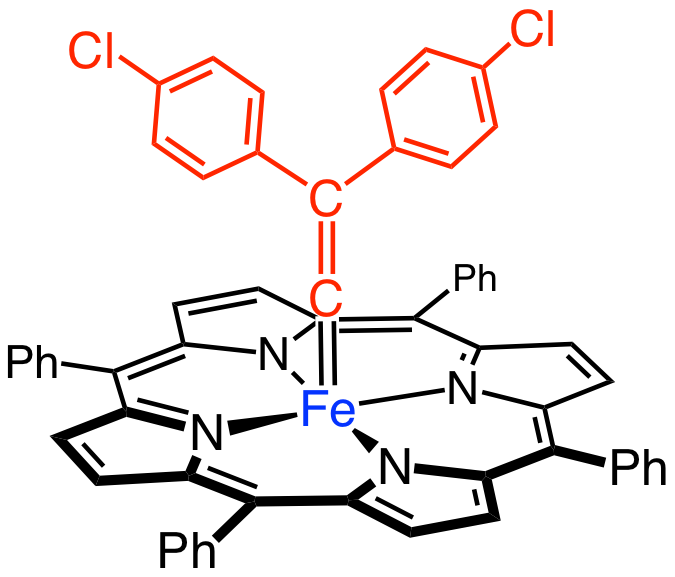
Structure of Fe(TPP)C_{2}(C_{6}H_{4}Cl)_{2}, one of several iron carbenoid complexes prepared by Mansuy (TPP = conjugate base of tetraphenylporphyrin).

Daniel Mansuy is particularly interested in phenomena at the interface between chemistry and biology, and in particular in the chemistry and pharmacochemistry of cytochromes P450. His work has led to the discovery of a new class of carbene and nitrene iron complexes and of one of the first catalytic systems of nitrene transfer to alkanes and alkenes. He has also developed new catalysts for the oxidation of alkanes, alkenes and aromatics, used to predict drug metabolism and in the field of pollution control. In the field of molecular toxicology, his work has led to understand the molecular origin of drug interactions involving macrolide antibiotics such as TAO and of immunoallergic drug hepatitis due to tienilic acid.

He is the author or co-author of more than 400 scientific publications.

== Awards and honours ==
- CNRS Silver Medal (1982)
- FEBS Award 1983
- Atochem Raymond Berr Award (1990)
- Elected Correspondent of the French Academy of Sciences (1993)
- Elected member of the French Academy of Sciences (1998)
- Ehrlich Award of the French Society of Therapeutic Chemistry (1999)
- Elected Associate Member of the French National Academy of Pharmacy (2010)
- He is Officier of the Ordre national du Mérite
