= Paul Rothemund (chemist, born 1904) =

Paul Wilhelm Karl Rothemund (January 13, 1904 – 1970) was a chemist who developed reactions related to porphyrins. The Rothemund reaction the still-classic process for the synthesis of these compounds is named for him. His grandson Paul W. K. Rothemund is also a chemist.

Rothemund worked in the lab of Hans Fischer in Germany prior to being recruited by Charles F. Kettering in 1930 to come to Antioch College to study photosynthesis and chlorophyll. In addition to being full professor at Antioch, he was affiliated with Ohio State University, ultimately becoming head of the chemistry department at the OSU Lima campus.

In addition to his own porphyrin work, Rothemund had graduate students who studied other pyrrole-based structures, including a project that demonstrated the macrocyclic nature of hexahydroporphine. That aspect is key to later interest in them as molecular containers for ion transport and molecular switches.
