= Coproporphyrinogen III oxidase =

Mammalian protein found in Homo sapiens

CPOX
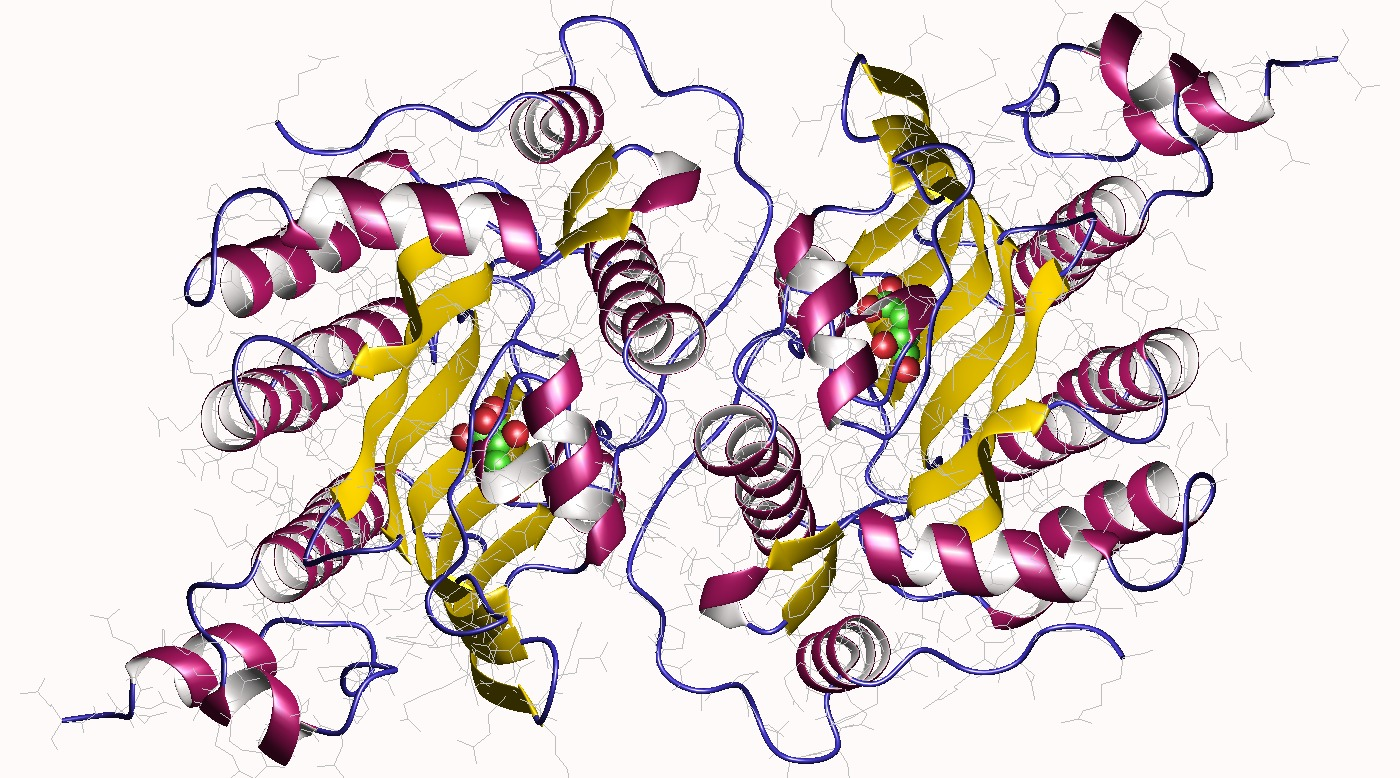

Identifiers
- Aliases: CPOX, CPO, CPX, HCP, coproporphyrinogen oxidase, COX, HARPO
- External IDs: OMIM: 612732; MGI: 104841; GeneCards: CPOX
Available structures
PDB	Ortholog search: PDBe RCSB
PDB	List of PDB id codes 2AEX
Enzyme activity
EC #	BRENDA	ExPASy	KEGG	MetaCyc
1.3.3.3	↗	↗	↗	↗

Gene location (Mouse)
Chr.	Chromosome 16 (mouse)
Band	16|16 C1.2	Start	58,490,655 bp
Band	16|16 C1.2	End	58,537,999 bp
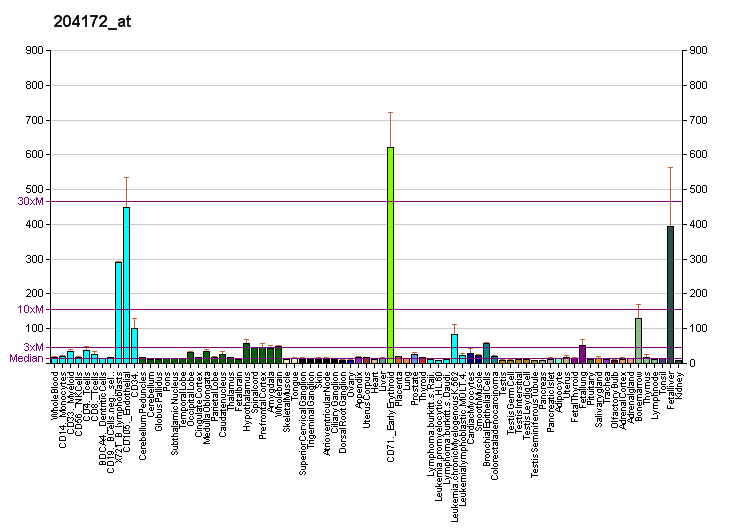
RNA expression pattern
Bgee	Human / Mouse (ortholog); Top expressed in: trabecular bone; jejunal mucosa; corpus callosum; right lobe of liver; bone marrow; inferior ganglion of vagus nerve; bone marrow cell; rectum; monocyte; duodenum / Top expressed in: human fetus; atrium; tibiofemoral joint; fetal liver hematopoietic progenitor cell; yolk sac; epithelium of small intestine; right kidney; pontine nuclei; ventral tegmental area; habenula; More reference expression data
BioGPS	More reference expression data
Gene ontology
Molecular function	coproporphyrinogen oxidase activity; protein homodimerization activity; structural constituent of eye lens; identical protein binding; oxidoreductase activity
Cellular component	membrane; mitochondrial intermembrane space; mitochondrion; mitochondrial inner membrane; cytosol; cytoplasm
Biological process	response to arsenic-containing substance; protoporphyrinogen IX biosynthetic process; porphyrin-containing compound biosynthetic process; response to iron ion; heme biosynthetic process; response to lead ion; response to inorganic substance; response to insecticide; response to methylmercury; protoporphyrinogen IX biosynthetic process from glutamate
Sources:Amigo / QuickGO
Orthologs
Databases	NCBI: entry
Species	Human	Mouse
Entrez	1371	12892
Ensembl	n/a	ENSMUSG00000022742
UniProt	P36551	P36552
RefSeq (mRNA)	NM_000097	NM_007757
RefSeq (protein)	NP_000088	NP_031783
Location (UCSC)	n/a	Chr 16: 58.49 – 58.54 Mb
PubMed search
- Wikidata
View/Edit Human	View/Edit Mouse

Coprogen oxidase
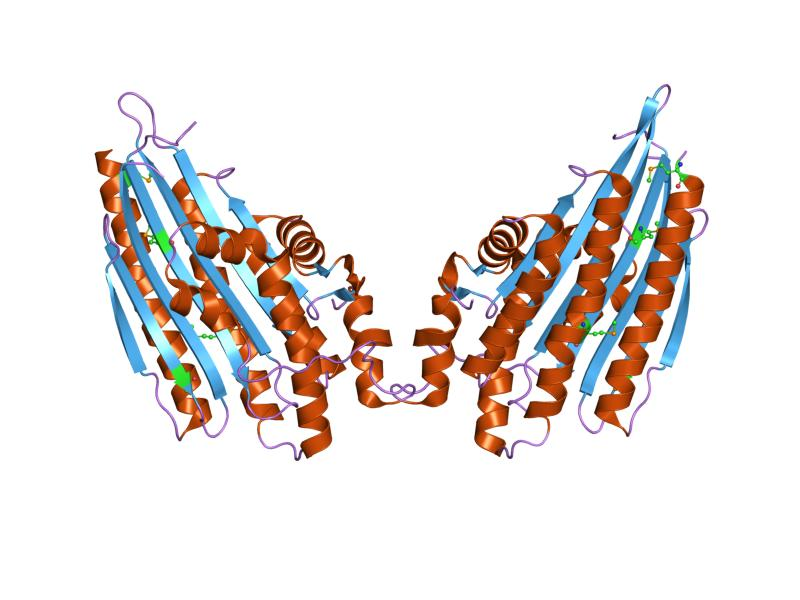
- coproporphyrinogen iii oxidase from leishmania major

Identifiers
- Symbol: Coprogen oxidase
- Pfam: PF01218
- InterPro: IPR001260
- PROSITE: PDOC00783
Available protein structures:
- PDB: IPR001260 PF01218 (ECOD; PDBsum)
- AlphaFold: IPR001260; PF01218

Coproporphyrinogen III oxidase

Identifiers
- EC no.: 1.3.3.3

Databases
- BRENDA: enzyme data
- ExPASy: NiceZyme view
- KEGG: enzyme entry
- MetaCyc: metabolic pathway
- Rhea: reactions
- PDB structures: RCSB PDB PDBe PDBsum
Search
- PMC: articles
- PubMed: articles
- NCBI: proteins

Coproporphyrinogen-III oxidase, mitochondrial (abbreviated as CPOX) is an enzyme that in humans is encoded by the CPOX gene. A genetic defect in the enzyme results in a reduced production of heme in animals. The medical condition associated with this enzyme defect is called hereditary coproporphyria.

CPOX, the sixth enzyme of the heme biosynthetic pathway, converts coproporphyrinogen III to protoporphyrinogen IX through two sequential steps of oxidative decarboxylation. The activity of the CPOX enzyme, located in the mitochondrial membrane, is measured in lymphocytes.

== Function ==
CPOX is an enzyme involved in the sixth step of porphyrin metabolism it catalyses the oxidative decarboxylation of coproporphyrinogen III to protoporphyrinogen IX in the haem and chlorophyll biosynthetic pathways. The protein is a homodimer containing two internally bound iron atoms per molecule of native protein.

coproporphyrinogen III
O_{2}
2 H_{2}O
protoporphyrinogen IX
+ 2 CO_{2}

The enzyme is active in the presence of molecular oxygen that acts as an electron acceptor. The enzyme is widely distributed having been found in a variety of eukaryotic and prokaryotic sources.

== Structure ==
=== Gene ===
Human CPOX is a mitochondrial enzyme encoded by a 14 kb CPOX gene containing seven exons located on chromosome 3 at q11.2.

=== Protein ===
CPOX is expressed as a 40 kDa precursor and contains an amino terminal mitochondrial targeting signal. After proteolytic processing, the protein is present as a mature form of a homodimer with a molecular mass of 37 kDa.

== Clinical significance ==
Hereditary coproporphyria (HCP) and harderoporphyria are two phenotypically separate disorders that concern partial deficiency of CPOX. Neurovisceral symptomatology predominates in HCP. Additionally, it may be associated with abdominal pain and/or skin photosensitivity. Hyper-excretion of coproporphyrin III in urine and faeces has been recorded in biochemical tests. HCP is an autosomal dominant inherited disorder, whereas harderoporphyria is a rare erythropoietic variant form of HCP and is inherited in an autosomal recessive fashion. Clinically, it is characterized by neonatal haemolytic anaemia. Sometimes, the presence of skin lesions with marked faecal excretion of harderoporphyrin is also described in harderoporphyric patients.

To date, over 50 CPOX mutations causing HCP have been described. Most of these mutations result in substitution of amino acid residues within the structural framework of CPOX. At least 32 of these mutations are considered to be disease-causing mutations. In terms of the molecular basis of HCP and harderoporphyria, mutations of CPOX in patients with harderoporphyria were demonstrated in the region of exon 6, where mutations in those with HCP were also identified. As only patients with mutation in this region (K404E) would develop harderoporphyria, this mutation led to diminishment of the second step of the decarboxylation reaction during the conversion of coproporphyrinogen to protoporphyrinogen, implying that the active site of the enzyme involved in the second step of decarboxylation is located in exon 6.

== Interactions ==
CPOX has been shown to interact with the atypical keto-isocoproporphyrin (KICP) in human subjects with mercury (Hg) exposure.

== See also ==
- Coproporphyrinogen dehydrogenase which catalyses the same reaction but uses S-adenosyl methionine as its oxidant
