= Tetraphenylporphyrin =

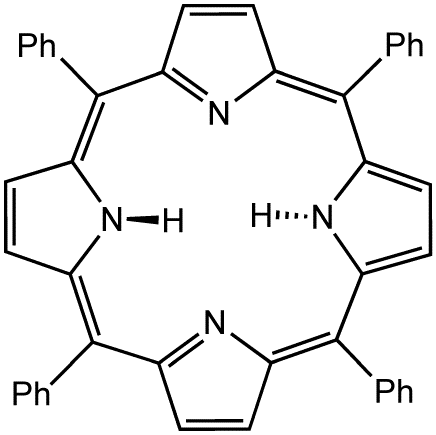

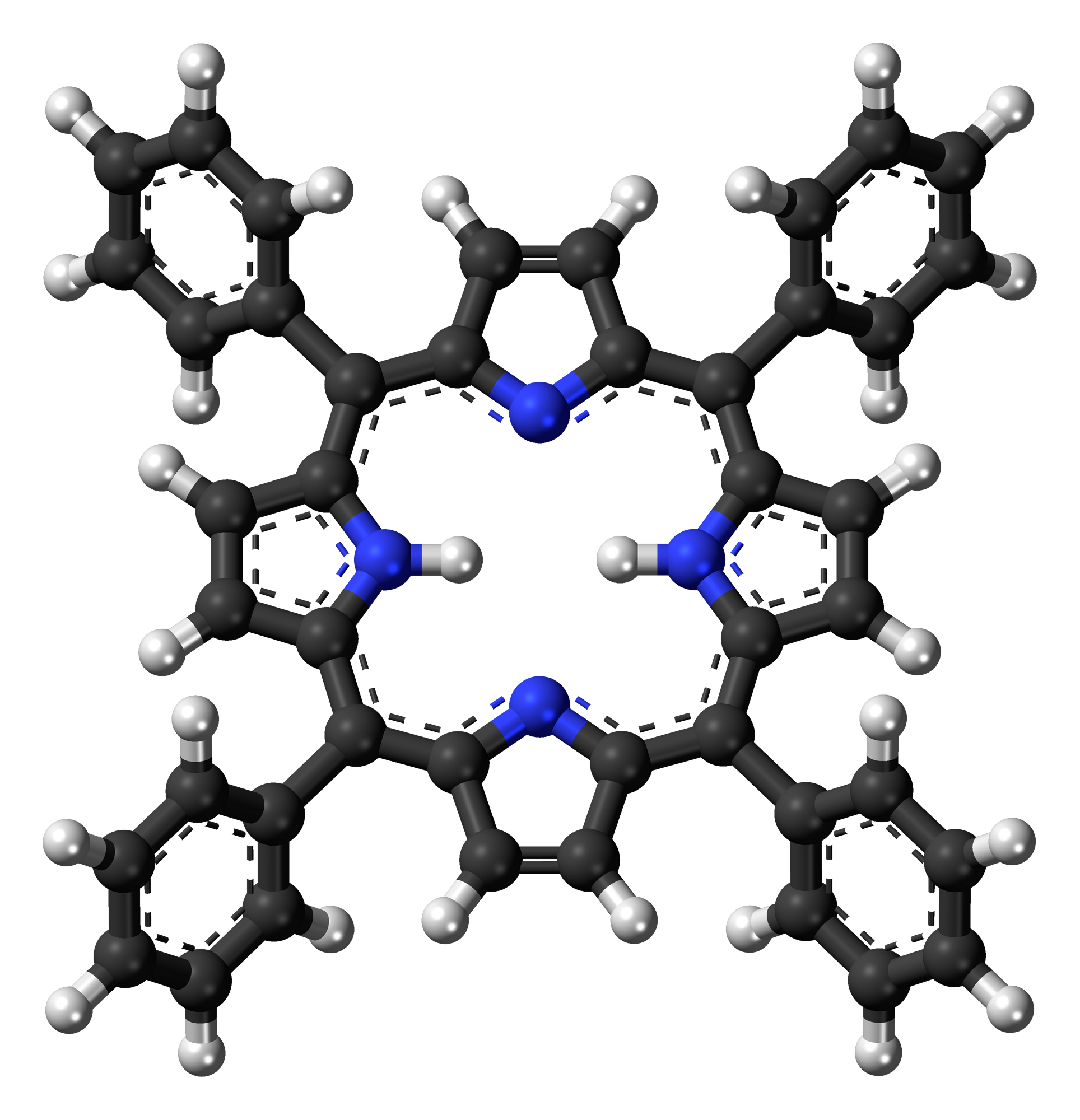

Names
- IUPAC name 5,10,15,20-Tetraphenylporphyrin
- Other names 5,10,15,20-Tetraphenylporphin, TPP, H2TPP

Identifiers
CAS Number	917-23-7
3D model (JSmol)	Interactive image
Beilstein Reference	379542
ChEBI	CHEBI:52279
ChEMBL	ChEMBL436524
ChemSpider	10291672
ECHA InfoCard	100.011.842
MeSH	C509964
PubChem CID	86280046
UNII	SDB2SH8G5K
CompTox Dashboard (EPA)	DTXSID2061272
- InChI: InChI=1S/C44H30N4/c1-5-13-29(14-6-1)41-33-21-23-35(45-33)42(30-15-7-2-8-16-30)37-25-27-39(47-37)44(32-19-11-4-12-20-32)40-28-26-38(48-40)43(31-17-9-3-10-18-31)36-24-22-34(41)46-36/h1-28,45,48H/b41-33-,41-34-,42-35-,42-37-,43-36-,43-38-,44-39-,44-40- Key: YNHJECZULSZAQK-LWQDQPMZSA-N; InChI=1/C44H30N4/c1-5-13-29(14-6-1)41-33-21-23-35(45-33)42(30-15-7-2-8-16-30)37-25-27-39(47-37)44(32-19-11-4-12-20-32)40-28-26-38(48-40)43(31-17-9-3-10-18-31)36-24-22-34(41)46-36/h1-28,45,48H/b41-33-,41-34-,42-35-,42-37-,43-36-,43-38-,44-39-,44-40- Key: YNHJECZULSZAQK-LWQDQPMZBQ
- SMILES: C=9C=CC(C7=C1C=CC(=N1)C(C=2C=CC=CC=2)=C3C=CC(N3)=C(C=4C=CC=CC=4)C=5C=CC(N=5)=C(C=6C=CC=CC=6)C8=CC=C7N8)=CC=9

Properties
Chemical formula	C_{44}H_{30}N_{4}
Molar mass	614.74 g/mol
Appearance	dark purple solid
Density	1.27 g/cm^{3}
Solubility in water	insoluble in water

Hazards
- GHS labelling
Pictograms	(GHS07: Exclamation mark)
Signal word	Warning
Hazard statements	H302, H312, H332
Precautionary statements	P261, P264, P270, P271, P280, P301+P312, P302+P352, P304+P312, P304+P340, P312, P322, P330, P363, P501
- Except where otherwise noted, data are given for materials in their standard state (at 25 °C [77 °F], 100 kPa). verify (what is ?) Infobox references

Tetraphenylporphyrin, abbreviated TPP or H_{2}TPP, is a synthetic heterocyclic compound that resembles naturally occurring porphyrins. Porphyrins are dyes and cofactors found in hemoglobin and cytochromes and are related to chlorophyll and vitamin B_{12}. The study of naturally occurring porphyrins is complicated by their low symmetry and the presence of polar substituents. Tetraphenylporphyrin is hydrophobic, symmetrically substituted, and easily synthesized. The compound is a dark purple solid that dissolves in nonpolar organic solvents such as chloroform and benzene.

== Synthesis and structure ==
Tetraphenylporphyrin was first synthesized in 1935 by Rothemund, who caused benzaldehyde and pyrrole to react in a sealed bomb at 150 °C for 24 h. Adler and Longo modified the Rothemund method by allowing benzaldehyde and pyrrole to react for 30 min in refluxing propionic acid (141 °C) open to the air:

8 C_{4}H_{4}NH + 8 C_{6}H_{5}CHO + 3 O_{2} → 2 (C_{6}H_{5}C)_{4}(C_{4}H_{2}N)_{2}(C_{4}H_{2}NH)_{2} + 14 H_{2}O

Despite its modest yields, the synthesis of H_{2}TPP is a common experiment in university teaching labs. Highly efficient routes to H_{2}TPP and many analogues involve the air-free condensation of the pyrrole and aldehyde to give the porphyrinogen. In this so-called Lindsey synthesis of meso-substituted porphyrins, the porphyrinogen is subsequently oxidized to deliver the porphyrin.

The conjugate base of the porphyrin, TPP^{2−}, belongs to the symmetry group D_{4h} while its hydrogenated counterpart H_{2}(TPP) is D_{2h}. Unlike natural porphyrins, H_{2}TPP is substituted at the oxidatively sensitive "meso" carbon positions, and hence the compound is sometimes called meso-tetraphenylporphyrin. Another synthetic porphyrin, octaethylporphyrin (H_{2}OEP) does have a substitution pattern that is biomimetic. Many derivatives of TPP and OEP are known, including those prepared from substituted benzaldehydes. One of the first functional analogues of myoglobin was the ferrous derivative of the "picket fence porphyrin," which is structurally related to Fe(TPP), being derived via the condensation of 2-nitrobenzaldehyde and pyrrole.

Metal-TPP Complexes

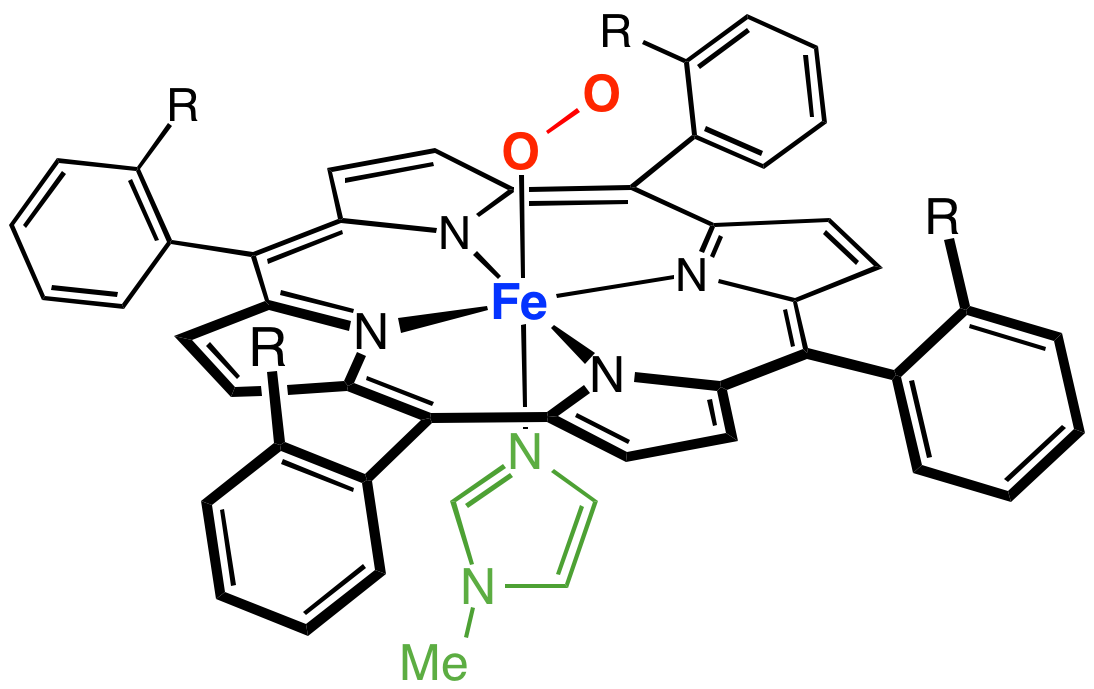
A picket-fence porphyrin complex of Fe, with axial coordination sites occupied by methylimidazole (green) and dioxygen (R = amide groups).

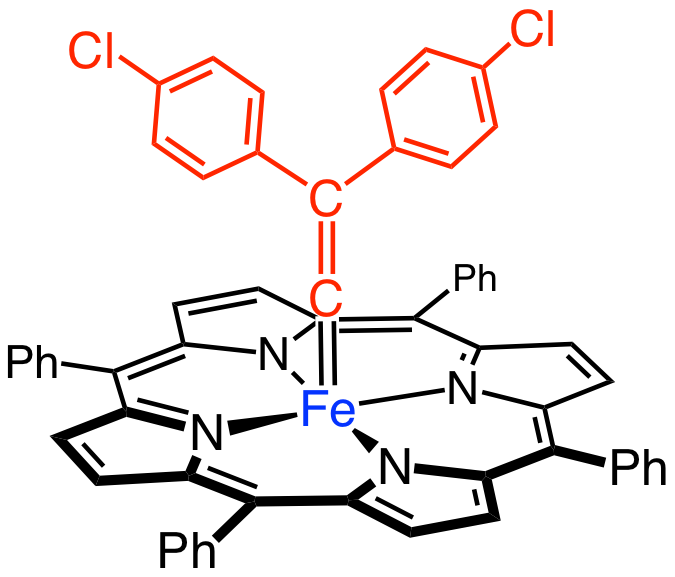
Structure of Fe(TPP)CC(C_{6}H_{4}Cl)_{2}, one of several iron carbenoid complexes reported by Daniel Mansuy.

Sulfonated derivatives of TPP are also well known to give water-soluble derivatives, e.g. tetraphenylporphine sulfonate:

4 SO_{3} + (C_{6}H_{5}C)_{4}(C_{4}H_{2}N)_{2}(C_{4}H_{2}NH)_{2}

→ (HO_{3}SC_{6}H_{4}C)_{4}(C_{4}H_{2}N)_{2}(C_{4}H_{2}NH)_{2} + 4 H_{2}O

== Complexes ==
Complexation can be thought of as proceeding via the conversion of H_{2}TPP to TPP^{2−}, with 4-fold symmetry. The metal insertion process proceeds via several steps, not via the dianion. Representative complexes:

- Cu(TPP)
- Zn(TPP)L_{x}
- VO(TPP)
- Fe(TPP)Cl
- Co(TPP)
- Ni(TPP)

== Optical properties ==
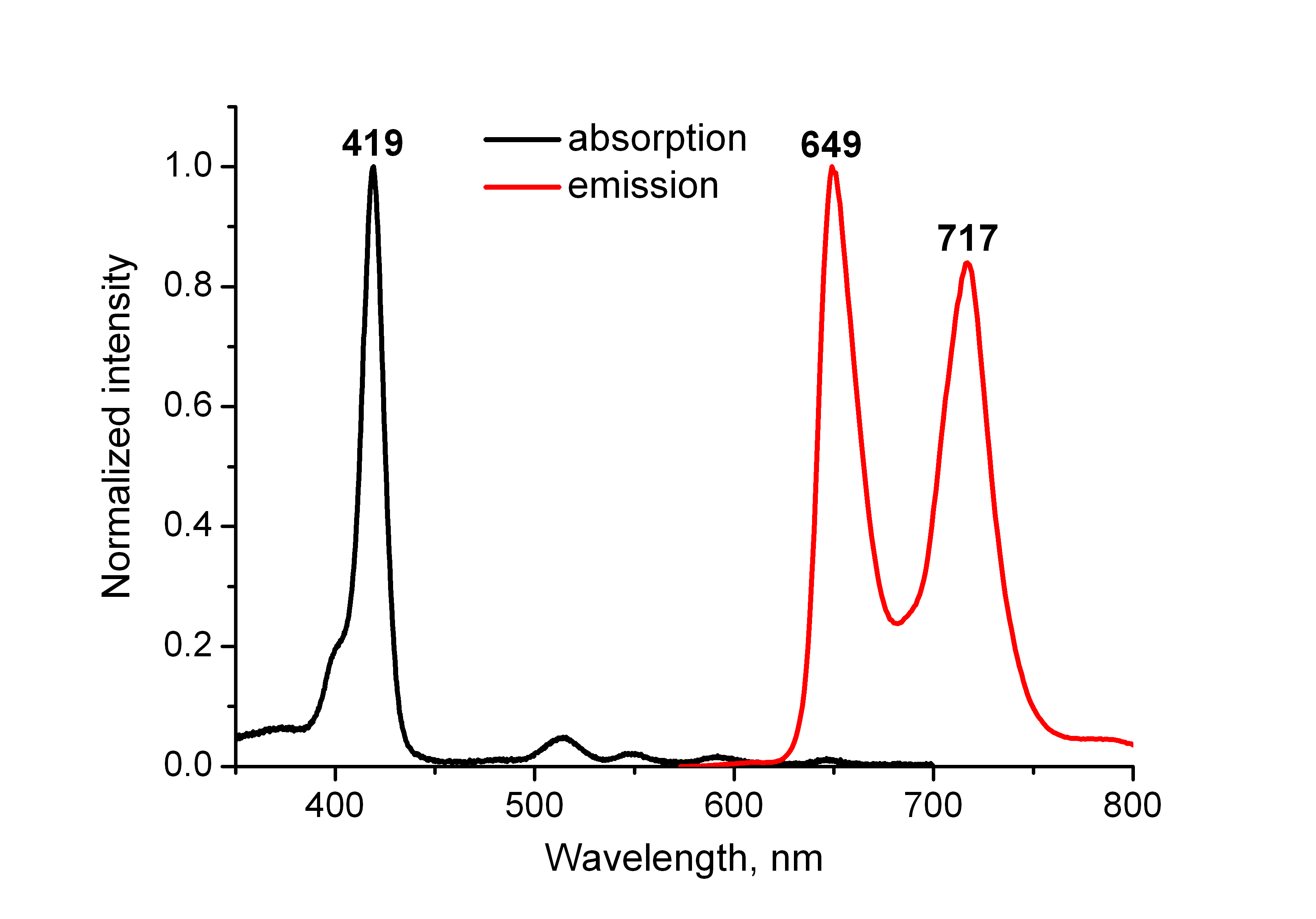
Optical properties of tetraphenylporphyrin in toluene

Tetraphenylporphyrin has a strong absorption band with maximum at 419 nm (so called Soret band) and four weak bands with maxima at 515, 550, 593 and 649 nm (so called Q-bands). It shows red fluorescence with maxima at 649 and 717 nm. The quantum yield is 11%. Soret red shifts for Zn(TTP)-Donor systems relative to the Soret band at 416.2 nm for Zn(TTP) in cyclohexane have been measured.

== Applications ==
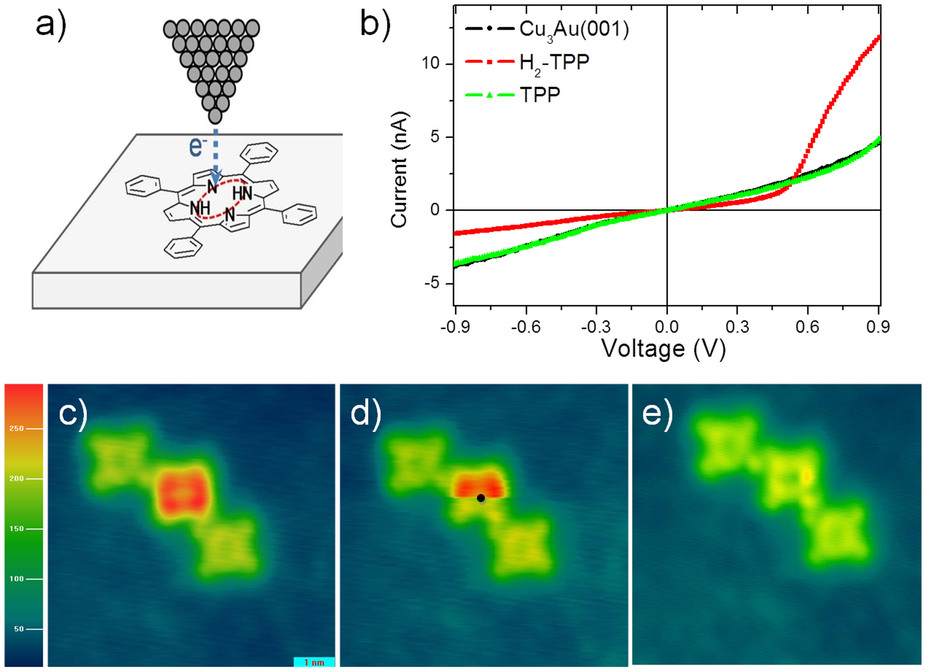
Hydrogen can be removed from individual H_{2}TPP molecules by applying excess voltage to the tip of a scanning tunneling microscope (a); this removal alters the I-V curves of TPP from diode like (red curve in b) to resistor like (green curve). Image (c) shows a row of TPP, H_{2}TPP and TPP molecules. While scanning image (d), excess voltage was applied to H_{2}TPP at the black dot, which instantly removed hydrogen, as shown in the bottom part of (d) and in the re-scan image (e).

H_{2}TPP is a photosensitizer for the production of singlet oxygen. Its molecules have potential applications in single-molecule electronics, as they show diode-like behavior that can be altered for each individual molecule.
