= 2,5-Bis(hydroxymethyl)pyrrole =

Names
- Preferred IUPAC name (1H-Pyrrole-2,5-diyl)dimethanol

Identifiers
CAS Number	6249-04-3
3D model (JSmol)	Interactive image
ChemSpider	4324991
PubChem CID	5151810
UNII	T54C5XUX7E
CompTox Dashboard (EPA)	DTXSID00408880
- InChI: Key: INNRTGSPTOTXLK-UHFFFAOYSA-N; InChI=1S/C6H9NO2/c8-3-5-1-2-6(4-9)7-5/h1-2,7-9H,3-4H2
- SMILES: C1=C(NC(=C1)CO)CO

Properties
Chemical formula	C_{6}H_{9}NO_{2}
Molar mass	127.143 g·mol^{−1}
- Except where otherwise noted, data are given for materials in their standard state (at 25 °C [77 °F], 100 kPa). Infobox references

2,5-Bis(hydroxymethyl)pyrrole is an organic chemical compound with formula C_{6}H_{9}O_{2}N, or (HOCH_{2})_{2}(C_{4}H_{3}N). Its molecule can be described as that of pyrrole C_{4}H_{5}N with hydroxymethyl groups HO−CH_{2}− replacing the two hydrogen atoms adjacent to the nitrogen atom.

The compound is a white solid, soluble in water and acetone. It is stable in alkaline solutions, but otherwise tends to polymerize by self-condensation. The compound was used as an intermediate in the synthesis of hexahydroporphine ("unsubstituted porphyrinogen"), the core of uroporphyrinogen III, precursor of many critically important biological products such as hemoglobin and chlorophyll.

== Preparation ==
The compound can be synthesized by formylation of pyrrole followed by reduction of the resulting pyrrolecarboxaldehyde.
