= Phthalane =

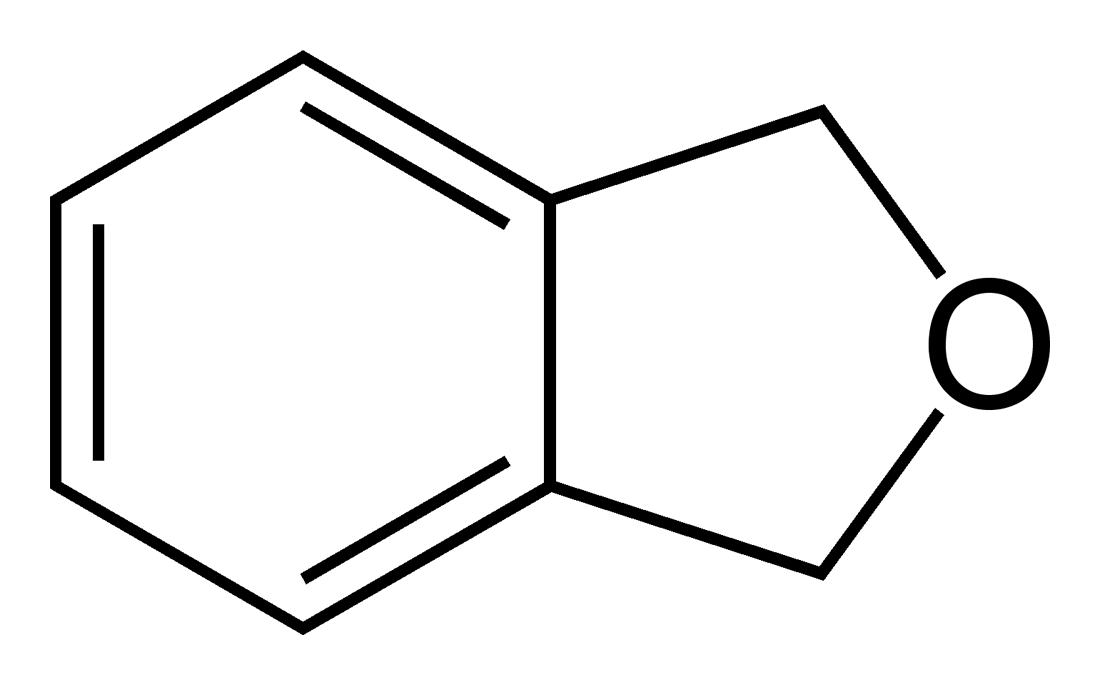

Names
- Preferred IUPAC name 1,3-Dihydro-2-benzofuran

Identifiers
CAS Number	496-14-0
3D model (JSmol)	Interactive image
ChemSpider	9904
ECHA InfoCard	100.007.106
EC Number	207-815-2
PubChem CID	10327
UNII	2R6NTQ7Y6G
CompTox Dashboard (EPA)	DTXSID60197920
- InChI: InChI=1S/C8H8O/c1-2-4-8-6-9-5-7(8)3-1/h1-4H,5-6H2 Key: SFLGSKRGOWRGBR-UHFFFAOYSA-N
- SMILES: c2ccc1COCc1c2

Properties
Chemical formula	C_{8}H_{8}O
Molar mass	120.148
- Except where otherwise noted, data are given for materials in their standard state (at 25 °C [77 °F], 100 kPa). verify (what is ?) Infobox references

Phthalane is a bicyclic aromatic organic compound. It is also known as isocoumaran, or 1,3-dihydro-2-benzofuran. One of derivatives of it is citalopram. It can be oxidised to phthalic acid.
