= Γ-Acetylenic GABA =

γ-Acetylenic GABA

Names
- IUPAC name 4-Aminohex-5-ynoic acid
- Other names: 4-Amino-5-hexynoic acid

Identifiers
CAS Number	57659-38-8
3D model (JSmol)	Interactive image
ChEMBL	ChEMBL330129
ChemSpider	3334
ECHA InfoCard	100.165.059
EC Number	637-345-7
PubChem CID	3452
UNII	PG9G3XCD6P
CompTox Dashboard (EPA)	DTXSID40973249
- InChI: InChI=1S/C6H9NO2/c1-2-5(7)3-4-6(8)9/h1,5H,3-4,7H2,(H,8,9) Key: BJNIHWSOVCDBHS-UHFFFAOYSA-N
- SMILES: C#CC(CCC(=O)O)N

Properties
Chemical formula	C_{6}H_{9}NO_{2}
Molar mass	127.143 g·mol^{−1}

Hazards
- GHS labelling
Pictograms	(GHS07: Exclamation mark)
Signal word	Warning
Hazard statements	H315, H319, H335
Precautionary statements	P261, P264, P264+P265, P271, P280, P302+P352, P304+P340, P305+P351+P338, P319, P321, P332+P317, P337+P317, P362+P364, P403+P233, P405, P501
- Except where otherwise noted, data are given for materials in their standard state (at 25 °C [77 °F], 100 kPa). Infobox references

γ-Acetylenic GABA, also known as 4-amino-5-hexynoic acid, is a potent and irreversible inhibitor of GABA-T.

== Mechanism of action ==
Like other GABA-T inhibitors, γ-acetylenic GABA causes GABA levels in the brain to be elevated. This is due to 4-aminobutyrate transaminase being the enzyme that converts γ-aminobutyric acid to L-glutamate. Inhibiting the enzyme stops this conversion from happening.

== Potential uses ==
=== Anti convulsant ===
Continuous administration of γ-acetylenic GABA on rats during four days was able to reduce or completely stop seizures that were induced by amygdala overstimulation.

=== Treatment of tardive dyskinesia ===
A study has showed that γ-acetylenic GABA could reduce tardive dyskinesia symptoms. This result mostly happened in subjects receiving higher doses.
