= Paul W. K. Rothemund =

Paul Rothemund
- Education: Caltech; University of Southern California
- Known for: DNA origami
- Awards: Feynman Prize in Nanotechnology; MacArthur Fellowship
- Scientific career
- Workplaces: Caltech

Paul Wilhelm Karl Rothemund is a research professor at the Computation and Neural Systems department at Caltech. He has become known in the fields of DNA nanotechnology and synthetic biology for his pioneering work with DNA origami. He shared both categories of the 2006 Feynman Prize in Nanotechnology with Erik Winfree for their work in creating DNA nanotubes, algorithmic molecular self-assembly of DNA tile structures, and their theoretical work on DNA computing. Rothemund is also a 2007 recipient of the MacArthur Fellowship.

== Life ==
Rothemund graduated from Laconia High School, New Hampshire, in 1990. He was the team captain of the championship Laconia team for the television quiz show Granite State Challenge. After graduating, Rothemund studied as an undergraduate at Caltech from 1990–1994, where he was a resident and member of Ricketts House. He attained his Ph.D. from the University of Southern California in 2001.

As a research fellow at Caltech, Rothemund has developed a technique to manipulate and fold strands of DNA known as DNA origami. Eventually, Rothemund hopes that self-assembly techniques could be used to create a "programming language for molecules, just as we have programming languages for computers." His work on large-scale sculptures of his DNA origami was exhibited at the Museum of Modern Art in New York from February 24 to May 12, 2008.

His grandfather, Paul Rothemund, was a chemist as well.
