= Protoporphyrinogen IX =

Identifiers
CAS Number	7412-77-3
3D model (JSmol)	Interactive image
ChEBI	CHEBI:57307
ChemSpider	20171538
MeSH	protoporphyrinogen
PubChem CID	20849104
CompTox Dashboard (EPA)	DTXSID90225068
- InChI: InChI=1S/C34H40N4O4/c1-7-21-17(3)25-13-26-19(5)23(9-11-33(39)40)31(37-26)16-32-24(10-12-34(41)42)20(6)28(38-32)15-30-22(8-2)18(4)27(36-30)14-29(21)35-25/h7-8,35-38H,1-2,9-16H2,3-6H3,(H,39,40)(H,41,42)/p-2 Key: UHSGPDMIQQYNAX-UHFFFAOYSA-L
- SMILES: CC1=C2CC3=C(C(=C(N3)CC4=C(C(=C(N4)CC5=C(C(=C(N5)CC(=C1CCC(=O)[O-])N2)CCC(=O)[O-])C)C=C)C)C=C)C

Properties
Chemical formula	C_{34}H_{38}N_{4}O_{4}
Molar mass	566.7 g/mol
- Except where otherwise noted, data are given for materials in their standard state (at 25 °C [77 °F], 100 kPa). Infobox references

Protoporphyrinogen IX is an organic chemical compound which is produced along the synthesis of porphyrins, a class of critical biochemicals that include hemoglobin and chlorophyll. It is a direct precursor of protoporphyrin IX.

The compound is a porphyrinogen, meaning that it has a non-aromatic hexahydroporphine core, which will be oxidized to a porphine core in later stages of the heme synthesis. Like most porphyrinogens, it is colorless.

== Biosynthesis ==
The compound is synthesized in most organisms from coproporphyrinogen III by the enzyme coproporphyrinogen oxidase:

coproporphyrinogen III
O_{2}
2 H_{2}O
O_{2}
2 H_{2}O
protoporphyrinogen IX
+ 2 CO_{2}

The process entails conversion of two of four propionic acid groups to vinyl groups.

By the action of protoporphyrinogen oxidase, protoporphyrinogen IX is later converted into protoporphyrin IX, the first colored tetrapyrrole in the biosynthesis of hemes.

protoporphyrinogen IX
3 O_{2}
3 H_{2}O_{2}
3 O_{2}
3 H_{2}O_{2}
protoporphyrin IX
