= Hexahydroporphine =

Names
- IUPAC name 5,10,15,20,22,24-Hexahydroporphyrin
- Other names Porphyrinogen; Calix[4]pyrrole

Identifiers
CAS Number	4396-11-6
3D model (JSmol)	Interactive image
Beilstein Reference	7545460
ChEBI	CHEBI:26213
ChemSpider	7827582
PubChem CID	9548659
CompTox Dashboard (EPA)	DTXSID101336477
- InChI: InChI=1S/C20H20N4/c1-2-14-10-16-5-6-18(23-16)12-20-8-7-19(24-20)11-17-4-3-15(22-17)9-13(1)21-14/h1-8,21-24H,9-12H2 Key: VCRBUDCZLSQJPZ-UHFFFAOYSA-N
- SMILES: C1C2=CC=C(N2)CC3=CC=C(N3)CC4=CC=C(N4)CC5=CC=C1N5

Properties
Chemical formula	C_{20}H_{20}N_{4}
Molar mass	316.408 g·mol^{−1}
Appearance	Colorless solid
Melting point	185 °C (365 °F; 458 K) (decomposes)
- Except where otherwise noted, data are given for materials in their standard state (at 25 °C [77 °F], 100 kPa). Infobox references

Hexahydroporphine is an organic chemical compound with formula C_{20}H_{20}N_{4}. The molecule consists of four pyrrole rings connected by methylene bridges −CH_{2}− into a larger (non-aromatic) macrocycle ring, which makes it one of the simplest tetrapyrroles, and the simplest "true" one. As indicated by the name, it may be viewed as derived from porphine by the addition of six hydrogen atoms: four on the methine bridges, and two on the nitrogen atoms.

Hexahydroporphine does not occur in nature, but is the core of porphyrinogens such as uroporphyrinogen III (UROGEN), which are precursors of many porphyrins — derivatives of porphine of great biological importance. The six hydrogens of that core are removed at a later metabolic stage by the enzyme protoporphyrinogen oxidase. Because of this connection, the compound is also called (unsubstituted) porphyrinogen.

The compound is a colorless solid, soluble in dichloromethane, acetone, and diethyl ether. It decomposes at 185°C.

== Preparation ==
Derivatives of hexahydroporphine, with various groups attached to the pyrrole or methylene bridges, occur in nature and have been studied for a long time. The unsubstituted compound, however, has been synthesized in good yield only in 2001. It can be obtained by successive condensations of 2,5-bis(hydroxymethyl)pyrrole and pyrrole, with a tripyrrole intermediate.

The compound can also be prepared by reduction of porphin-zinc complexes.

== See also ==
- Tetrahydroporphine
