= Porphine =

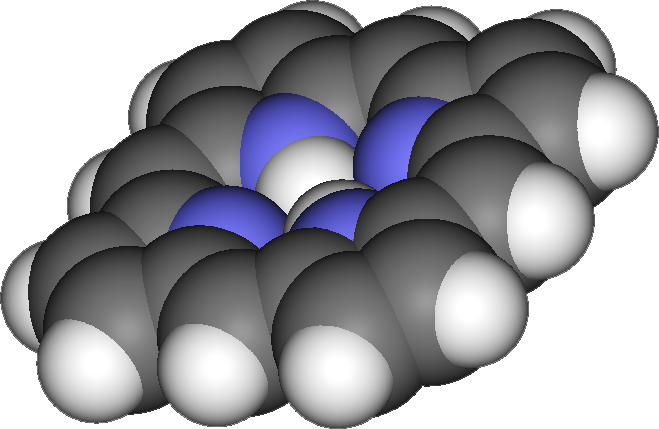

Names
- IUPAC name Porphyrin
- Other names Porphin

Identifiers
CAS Number	101-60-0
3D model (JSmol)	Interactive image
ChEBI	CHEBI:8337
ChemSpider	10447586
ECHA InfoCard	100.002.690
PubChem CID	66868
UNII	604BGD9J5B
CompTox Dashboard (EPA)	DTXSID6059235
- InChI: InChI=1S/C20H14N4/c1-2-14-10-16-5-6-18(23-16)12-20-8-7-19(24-20)11-17-4-3-15(22-17)9-13(1)21-14/h1-12,21,24H/b13-9-,14-10-,15-9-,16-10-,17-11-,18-12-,19-11-,20-12- Key: RKCAIXNGYQCCAL-CEVVSZFKSA-N; InChI=1/C20H14N4/c1-2-14-10-16-5-6-18(23-16)12-20-8-7-19(24-20)11-17-4-3-15(22-17)9-13(1)21-14/h1-12,21,24H/b13-9-,14-10-,15-9-,16-10-,17-11-,18-12-,19-11-,20-12- Key: RKCAIXNGYQCCAL-CEVVSZFKBA
- SMILES: C1=CC2=CC5=CC=C(C=C4C=CC(C=C3C=CC(=CC1=N2)N3)=N4)N5

Properties
Chemical formula	C_{20}H_{14}N_{4}
Molar mass	310.35196 g/mol
Appearance	Dark red, shiny leaflets
Melting point	N/A
- Except where otherwise noted, data are given for materials in their standard state (at 25 °C [77 °F], 100 kPa). verify (what is ?) Infobox references

Porphine or porphin is an organic compound of empirical formula C_{20}H_{14}N_{4}. It is heterocyclic and aromatic. The molecule is a flat macrocycle, consisting of four pyrrole-like rings joined by four methine bridges, which makes it the simplest of the tetrapyrroles.

The nonpolar tetrapyrrolic ring structure of porphine means it is poorly soluble in most organic solvents and hardly water soluble. As a result, porphine is mostly of theoretical interest. It has been detected in GC-MS of certain fractions of Piper betle.

== Porphine derivatives: porphyrins ==
Substituted derivatives of porphine are called porphyrins. Many porphyrins are found in nature with the dominant example being protoporphyrin IX. Many synthetic porphyrins are also known, including octaethylporphyrin and tetraphenylporphyrin.

Common porphyrins

Derivatives of protoporphyrin IX are common in nature, the precursor to hemes.

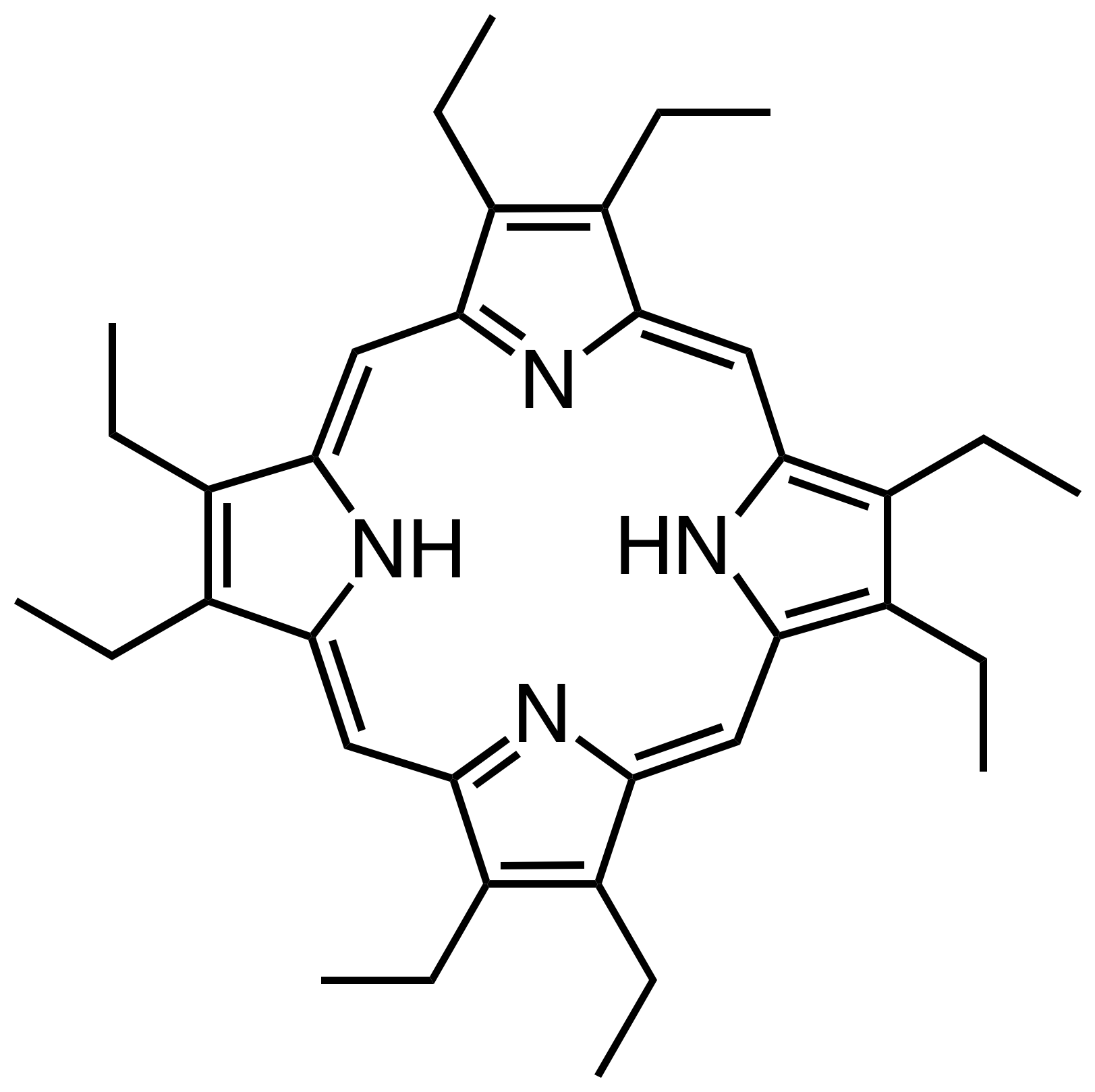
Octaethylporphyrin (H_{2}OEP) is a synthetic analogue of protoporphyrin IX. Unlike the natural porphyrin ligands, OEP^{2−} is highly symmetrical.

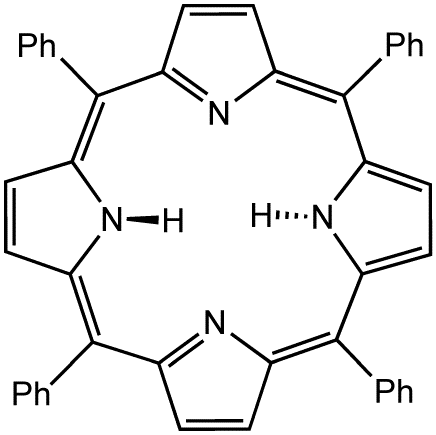
Tetraphenylporphyrin (H_{2}TPP)is another synthetic analogue of protoporphyrin IX. Unlike the natural porphyrin ligands, TPP^{2−} is highly symmetrical. Another difference is that its methine centers are occupied by phenyl groups.
