= Coproporphyrinogen III =

Names
- IUPAC name 3-[8,12,17-tris(2-carboxyethyl)-3,7,13,18-tetramethyl-5,10,15,20,21,22, 23,24-octahydroporphyrin-2-yl]propanoic acid

Identifiers
CAS Number	2624-63-7
3D model (JSmol)	Interactive image
ChemSpider	315
MeSH	Coproporphyrinogen+III
PubChem CID	321
CompTox Dashboard (EPA)	DTXSID40180875
- InChI: InChI=1S/C36H44N4O8/c1-17-21(5-9-33(41)42)29-14-27-19(3)22(6-10-34(43)44)30(39-27)15-28-20(4)24(8-12-36(47)48)32(40-28)16-31-23(7-11-35(45)46)18(2)26(38-31)13-25(17)37-29/h37-40H,5-16H2,1-4H3,(H,41,42)(H,43,44)(H,45,46)(H,47,48) Key: NIUVHXTXUXOFEB-UHFFFAOYSA-N; InChI=1/C36H44N4O8/c1-17-21(5-9-33(41)42)29-14-27-19(3)22(6-10-34(43)44)30(39-27)15-28-20(4)24(8-12-36(47)48)32(40-28)16-31-23(7-11-35(45)46)18(2)26(38-31)13-25(17)37-29/h37-40H,5-16H2,1-4H3,(H,41,42)(H,43,44)(H,45,46)(H,47,48) Key: NIUVHXTXUXOFEB-UHFFFAOYAI
- SMILES: Cc1c2[nH]c(c1CCC(=O)O)Cc3c(c(c([nH]3)Cc4c(c(c([nH]4)Cc5c(c(c([nH]5)C2)C)CCC(=O)O)CCC(=O)O)C)CCC(=O)O)C

Properties
Chemical formula	C_{36}H_{44}N_{4}O_{8} protonated carboxylic acids
Molar mass	660.757 g/mol
- Except where otherwise noted, data are given for materials in their standard state (at 25 °C [77 °F], 100 kPa). Infobox references

Coproporphyrinogen III is a metabolic intermediate in the biosynthesis of many compounds that are critical for living organisms, such as hemoglobin and chlorophyll. It is a colorless solid.

The compound is a porphyrinogen, a class of compounds characterized by a hexahydroporphine core with various side chains. The coproporphyrinogens have the outermost hydrogen atoms of the core replaced by four methyl groups −CH_{3} (M) and four propionic acid groups −CH_{2}−CH_{2}−COOH (P). In coproporphyrogen III, the order around the outer ring is MP-MP-MP-PM. For comparison, coproporphyrinogen I has them in the sequence MP-MP-MP-MP. heme.

== Biosynthesis and metabolism ==
In the main porphyrin biosynthesis pathway, coproporphyrinogen III is derived from uroporphyrinogen III by the action of the enzyme uroporphyrinogen III decarboxylase:

uroporphyrinogen III
4 CO_{2}
4 CO_{2}
coproporphyrinogen III

The conversion entails four decarboxylations, which turn the four acetic acid groups −CH_{2}−COOH into methyl groups −CH_{3}, with release of four carbon dioxide molecules.

Coproporphyrinogen III is further used as a substrate for the enzyme coproporphyrinogen III oxidase which oxidizes and further decarboxylates it to protoporphyrinogen IX.

coproporphyrinogen III
O_{2}
2 H_{2}O
O_{2}
2 H_{2}O
protoporphyrinogen IX
+ 2 CO_{2}
