= Octaethylporphyrin =

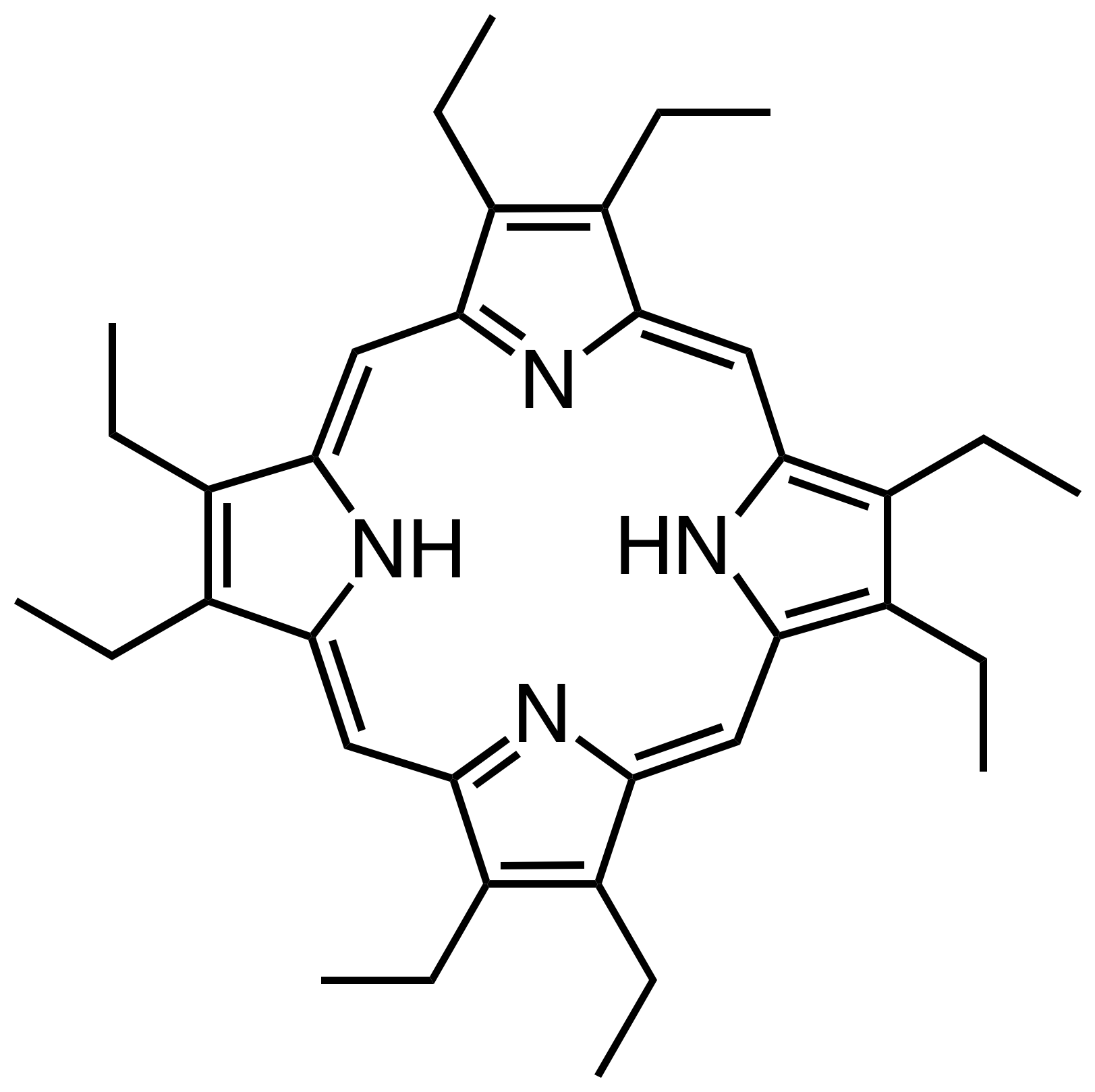

Names
- IUPAC name 2,3,7,8,12,13,17,18-Octaethylporphyrin
- Other names 2,3,7,8,12,13,17,18-Octaethyl-21H,23H-porphine

Identifiers
CAS Number	2683-82-1
3D model (JSmol)	Interactive image
Beilstein Reference	379798
ChEBI	CHEBI:52183
ChemSpider	10445887
EC Number	220-243-8
PubChem CID	102311
UNII	PD85YF7CEP
CompTox Dashboard (EPA)	DTXSID2062589
- InChI: InChI=1S/C36H46N4/c1-9-21-22(10-2)30-18-32-25(13-5)26(14-6)34(39-32)20-36-28(16-8)27(15-7)35(40-36)19-33-24(12-4)23(11-3)31(38-33)17-29(21)37-30/h17-20,37,40H,9-16H2,1-8H3/b29-17-,30-18-,31-17-,32-18-,33-19-,34-20-,35-19-,36-20- Key: HCIIFBHDBOCSAF-MUZKIALCSA-N
- SMILES: CCC1=C(C2=CC3=NC(=CC4=C(C(=C(N4)C=C5C(=C(C(=N5)C=C1N2)CC)CC)CC)CC)C(=C3CC)CC)CC

Properties
Chemical formula	C_{36}H_{46}N_{4}
Molar mass	534.792 g·mol^{−1}
Appearance	purple solid
- Except where otherwise noted, data are given for materials in their standard state (at 25 °C [77 °F], 100 kPa). Infobox references

Octaethylporphyrin (H_{2}OEP) is an organic compound that is a relative of naturally occurring heme pigments. The compound is used in the preparation of models for the prosthetic group in heme proteins. It is a dark purple solid that is soluble in organic solvents. As its conjugate base OEP^{2-}, it forms a range of transition metal porphyrin complexes. When treated with ferric chloride in hot acetic acid solution, it gives the square pyramidal complex Fe(OEP)Cl. It also forms the square planar complexes Ni(OEP) and Cu(OEP).

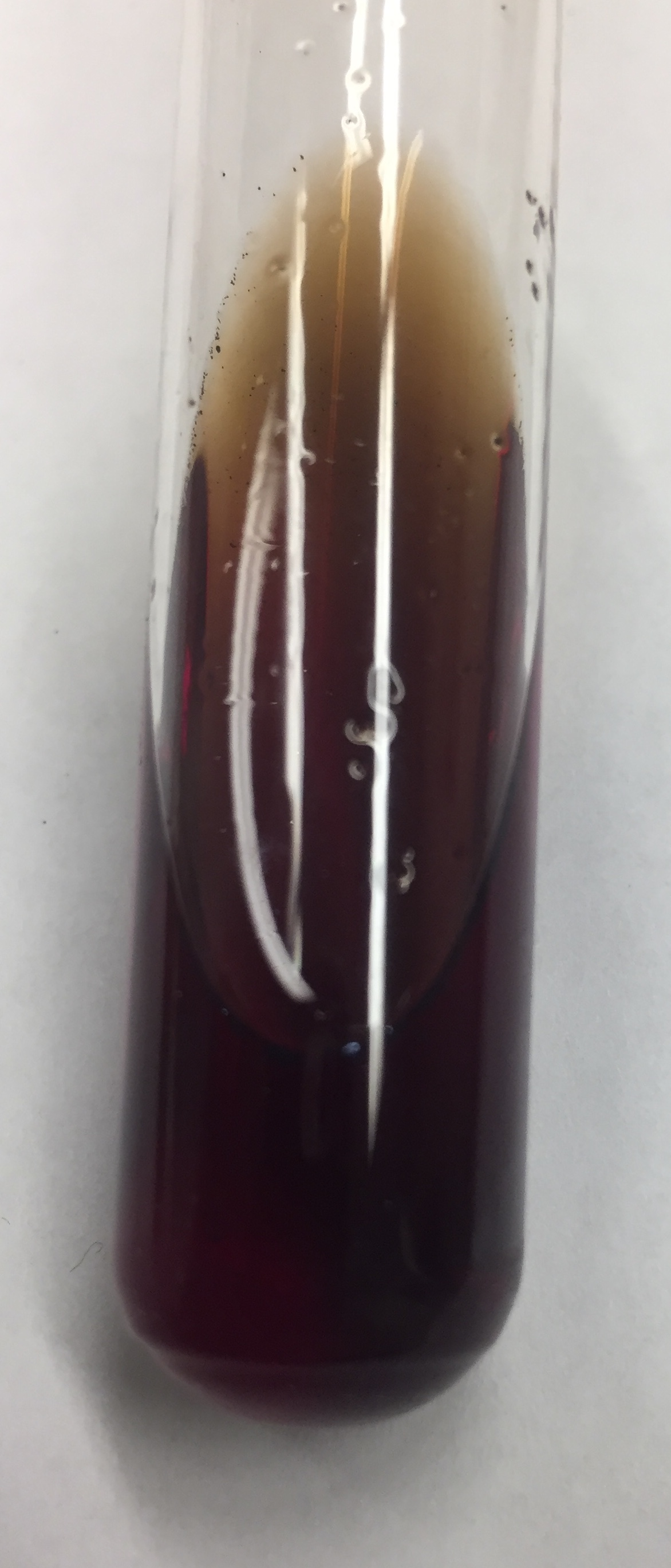
Saturated solution of H_{2}OEP in dichloromethane.

== Contrast with other porphyrins ==
Unlike complexes of the naturally occurring porphyrins, OEP complexes have four-fold symmetry, which simplifies spectroscopic analysis. In contrast to tetraphenylporphyrin and related analogues, H_{2}OEP features unprotected meso positions. In this way, it is a more accurate model for naturally occurring porphyrins.

== Synthesis ==
H_{2}OEP is prepared by condensation of 3,4-diethylpyrrole with formaldehyde. The pyrrole precursor may be synthesised by a Barton-Zard reaction of ethyl isocyanoacetate and 3-nitro-3-hexene; the latter can be generated in situ by elimination of acetic acid from 4-acetoxy-3-nitrohexane. Both the elimination and cyclicization reactions require an equivalent of a non-nucleophilic base such as diazabicycloundecene.
