= 4-Methylbenzaldehyde =

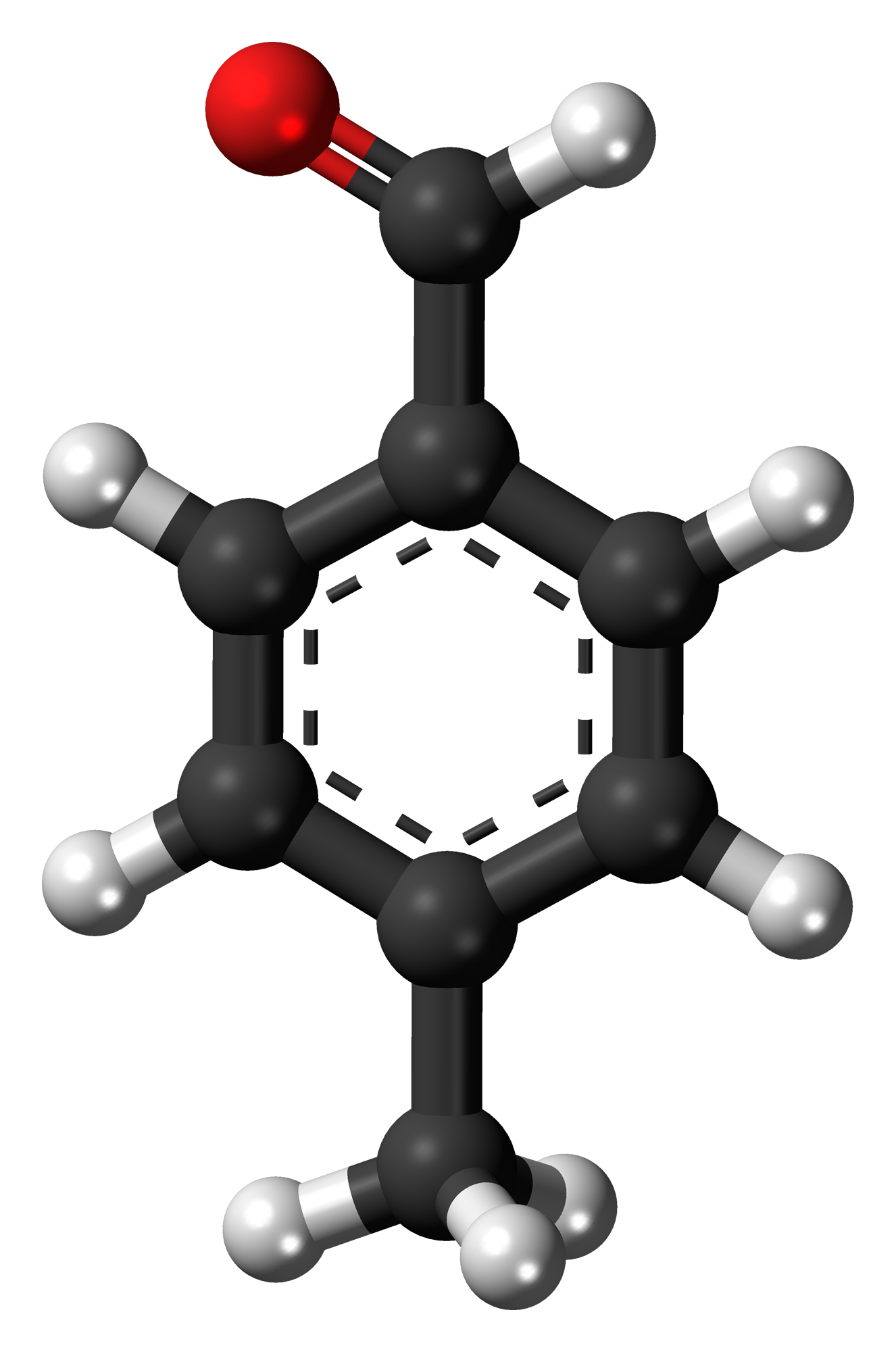

Names
- Preferred IUPAC name 4-Methylbenzaldehyde
- Other names p-Tolualdehyde; p-Tolylaldehyde

Identifiers
CAS Number	104-87-0
3D model (JSmol)	Interactive image; Interactive image
ChEBI	CHEBI:28617
ChEMBL	ChEMBL190927
ChemSpider	13865424
ECHA InfoCard	100.002.952
KEGG	C06758
PubChem CID	7725
UNII	GAX22QZ28Q
CompTox Dashboard (EPA)	DTXSID9041520
- InChI: InChI=1S/C8H8O/c1-7-2-4-8(6-9)5-3-7/h2-6H,1H3 Key: FXLOVSHXALFLKQ-UHFFFAOYSA-N; InChI=1/C8H8O/c1-7-2-4-8(6-9)5-3-7/h2-6H,1H3 Key: FXLOVSHXALFLKQ-UHFFFAOYAK
- SMILES: CC1=CC=C(C=C1)C=O; O=Cc1ccc(C)cc1

Properties
Chemical formula	C_{8}H_{8}O
Molar mass	120.14852
Appearance	colorless liquid
Density	1.019 g/mL (25 °C)
Melting point	−6.00 °C (21.20 °F; 267.15 K)
Boiling point	204 to 205 °C (399 to 401 °F; 477 to 478 K)
Refractive index (n_{D})	1.545 (20 °C)

Hazards
- Safety data sheet (SDS)

Related compounds
Related compounds	Benzaldehyde
- Except where otherwise noted, data are given for materials in their standard state (at 25 °C [77 °F], 100 kPa). verify (what is ?) Infobox references

4-Methylbenzaldehyde is the aromatic aldehyde with the formula CH_{3}C_{6}H_{4}CHO. It is a colorless liquid. Commercially available, it may be prepared from the Friedel-Crafts formylation of toluene with carbon monoxide and hydrogen chloride under Gattermann-Koch conditions. 4-Methylbenzaldehyde has a cherry-like scent similar to benzaldehyde, and finds some use in the fragrance industry.

4-Methylbenzaldehyde is a precursor to terephthalic acid, which is used to make various plastics.

p-Tolualdehyde is used in the flavoring/fragrance industry because of its cherry/almond flavor/aroma and it is GRAS regulated for these purposes. Actual synthetic uses also include: Bicifadine, Enzacamene, Tolibut, Aptrol, 4-methylmethamphetamine, Wy-28342, PheTQS, & Imrecoxib (via the mandelic acid FGI to the phenylacetic acid).
