= Epyrifenacil =

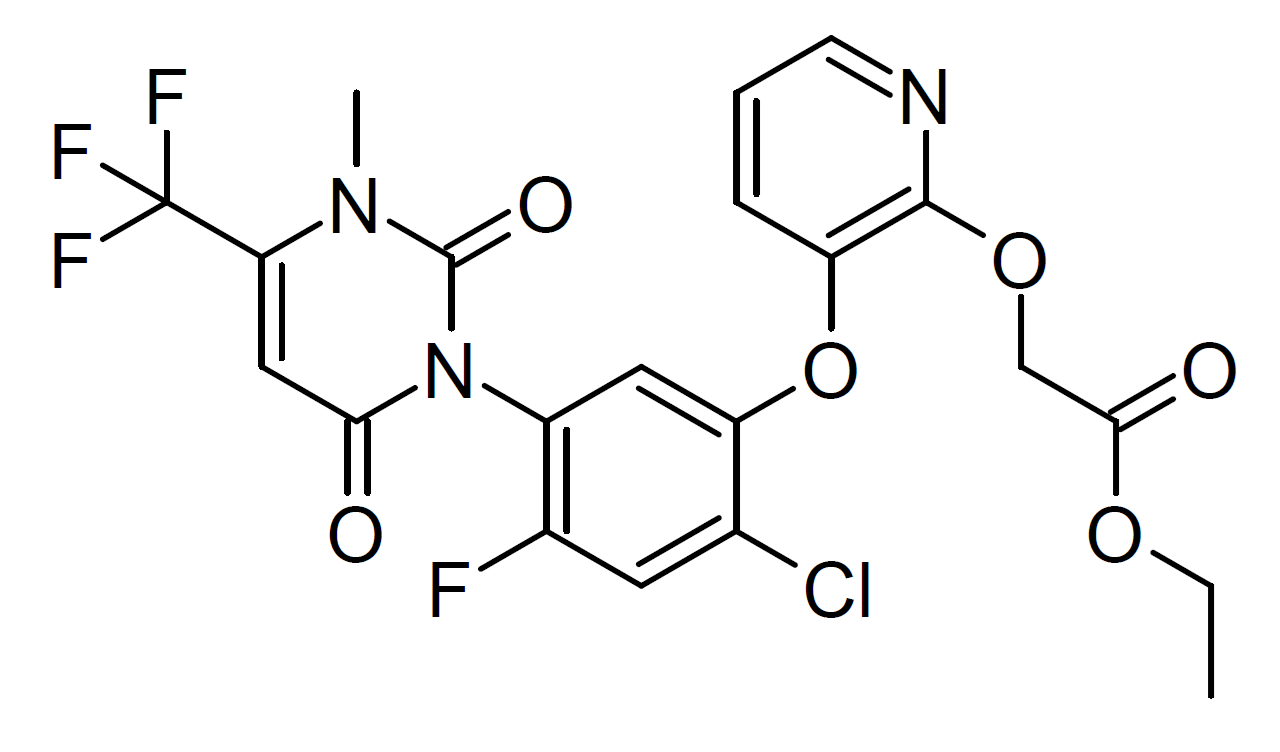

Names
- Preferred IUPAC name Ethyl 2-[[3-[2-chloro-4-fluoro-5-[3-methyl-2,6-dioxo-4-(trifluoromethyl)pyrimidin-1-yl]phenoxy]-2-pyridinyl]oxy]acetate

Identifiers
CAS Number	353292-31-6
3D model (JSmol)	Interactive image
ChEBI	CHEBI:191218
EC Number	885-819-9
PubChem CID	12097345
UNII	RAE3HFQ5BK
CompTox Dashboard (EPA)	DTXSID501020547
- InChI: InChI=1S/C21H16ClF4N3O6/c1-3-33-18(31)10-34-19-14(5-4-6-27-19)35-15-8-13(12(23)7-11(15)22)29-17(30)9-16(21(24,25)26)28(2)20(29)32/h4-9H,3,10H2,1-2H3 Key: XPEVJXBWHXAUDR-UHFFFAOYSA-N
- SMILES: CCOC(=O)COC1=C(C=CC=N1)OC2=C(C=C(C(=C2)N3C(=O)C=C(N(C3=O)C)C(F)(F)F)F)Cl

Properties
Chemical formula	C_{21}H_{16}ClF_{4}N_{3}O_{6}
Molar mass	517.82 g·mol^{−1}

Hazards
- GHS labelling
Pictograms	(GHS09: Environmental hazard)
Signal word	Warning
Hazard statements	H410
Precautionary statements	P273, P391, P501
- Except where otherwise noted, data are given for materials in their standard state (at 25 °C [77 °F], 100 kPa). Infobox references

Epyrifenacil is an herbicide from the pyrimidinedione class which acts as a protoporphyrinogen oxidase inhibitor. It is effective against grass weeds and some broadleaf weeds. and is used for pre-plant burndown on canola, field corn, soybean, and wheat fields, and for non-agricultural use on non-crop areas such as areas around industrial or farm buildings.

== Mode of Action ==
Epyrifenacil inhibits the enzyme protoporphyrinogen oxidase, which is involved in the biosynthesis of chlorophyll and heme.

== Health and Safety ==
Epyrifenacil is hepatotoxic and carcinogenic in animal models, but these effects are not considered likely to affect humans at relevant exposure levels.

One of the major products of the environmental degradation of epyrifenacil is the PFAS-type groundwater pollutant trifluoroacetic acid.

== Regulation ==
The U.S. EPA approved epyrifenacil as a new ingredient on June 30, 2026.

It has not yet been approved in the EU.

== See also ==
- Butafenacil
- Saflufenacil
