= Chelatase =

Class of enzymes

In biochemistry, chelatases are enzymes that catalyze the insertion ("metalation") of naturally occurring tetrapyrroles. Many tetrapyrrole-based cofactors exist in nature including hemes, chlorophylls, and vitamin B12. These metallo cofactors are derived by the reaction of metal cations with tetrapyrroles, which are not ligands per se, but the conjugate acids thereof. In the case of ferrochelatases, the reaction that chelatases catalyze is:

Fe^{2+} + H_{2}P → FeP + 2 H^{+}

In the above equation H_{2}P represents a sirohydrochlorin or a porphyrin, such as protoporphyrin IX.

Protoporphyrin IX features a rigid 18-membered ring, with a N4 cavity occupied with two protons. The displacement of those protons and insertion of a metal cation requires the presence of chelatases.

Chelatases are required because porphyrins and related macrocyclic ligands are extremely slow to metalate, despite favorable thermodynamics. These low rates are attributed to the tight fit of the metal into the rigid 18- or 17-membered tetrapyrrole macrocycle. Several families of chelatase are known including cobalt chelatase, magnesium chelatase, and ferrochelatase. Nickel insertion into a sirohydrochlorin also requires a chelatase as part of the biosynthesis of cofactor F430. Apparently that chelatase is identical to the cobalt chelatase.
