= Dihydrosirohydrochlorin =

Names
- Other names precorrin 2

Identifiers
CAS Number	82542-92-5
3D model (JSmol)	Interactive image
ChEBI	CHEBI:50602
ChemSpider	26333172
KEGG	C02463
MeSH	15,23-dihydrosirohydrochlorin
PubChem CID	5280516
- InChI: InChI=1S/C42H48N4O16/c1-41(17-39(59)60)23(5-9-35(51)52)29-14-27-21(11-37(55)56)19(3-7-33(47)48)25(43-27)13-26-20(4-8-34(49)50)22(12-38(57)58)28(44-26)15-31-42(2,18-40(61)62)24(6-10-36(53)54)30(46-31)16-32(41)45-29/h14-16,23-24,43-45H,3-13,17-18H2,1-2H3,(H,47,48)(H,49,50)(H,51,52)(H,53,54)(H,55,56)(H,57,58)(H,59,60)(H,61,62)/b29-14-,31-15-,32-16-/t23-,24-,41+,42+/m1/s1 Key: OQIIYZQTTMKFAU-ZNLOQLQNSA-N; Key: CSWLXNNNLVVXKD-ZIBVGKFXSA-N
- SMILES: C[C@@]1(CC(=O)O)/C2=C/c3[nH]c(c(CCC(=O)O)c3CC(=O)O)Cc3[nH]c(c(CC(=O)O)c3CCC(=O)O)/C=C3\N/C(=C\C(=N2)[C@H]1CCC(=O)O)[C@@](C)(CC(=O)O)[C@@H]3CCC(=O)O

Properties
Chemical formula	C_{42}H_{48}N_{4}O_{16}
- Except where otherwise noted, data are given for materials in their standard state (at 25 °C [77 °F], 100 kPa). Infobox references

Dihydrosirohydrochlorin is one of several naturally occurring tetrapyrrole macrocyclic metabolic intermediates in the biosynthesis of vitamin B_{12} (cobalamin). Its oxidised form, sirohydrochlorin, is precursor to sirohaem, the iron-containing prosthetic group in sulfite reductase enzymes. Further biosynthetic transformations convert sirohydrochlorin to cofactor F430 for an enzyme which catalyzes the release of methane in the final step of methanogenesis.

== Biosynthesis ==
Dihydrosirohydrochlorin is derived from a tetrapyrrolic structural framework created by the enzymes deaminase and cosynthetase which transform aminolevulinic acid via porphobilinogen and hydroxymethylbilane to uroporphyrinogen III. The latter is the first macrocyclic intermediate common to haem, chlorophyll, sirohaem and vitamin B_{12}. Uroporphyrinogen III is subsequently transformed by the enzyme uroporphyrinogen-III C-methyltransferase which adds two methyl groups to form dihydrosirohydrochlorin.

uroporphyrinogen III
+ 2 SAM
dihydrosirohydrochlorin
+ 2 SAH

The first methylation reaction converts uroporphyrinogen III into precorrin-1 and the second forms dihydrosirohydrochlorin (precorrin-2). In both cases the methyl group comes from the cofactor, S-adenosyl methionine (SAM), which gives S-adenosyl-L-homocysteine (SAH).

== Biochemical reactions ==
The next step in cobalamin biosynthesis introduces a third methyl group when the enzyme precorrin-2 C20-methyltransferase acts on precorrin-2:

precorrin-2
+ SAM
precorrin-3A
+ SAH

This forms precorrin-3A by methyl group insertion from SAM.

Dihydrosirohydrochlorin is also an intermediate in the biosynthetic pathway towards siroheme and cofactor F430 via sirohydrochlorin. It is oxidised by precorrin-2 dehydrogenase

dihydrosirohydrochlorin
+ NAD^{+}
H^{+}
H^{+}
sirohydrochlorin
+ NADH

The enzyme uses nicotinamide adenine dinucleotide (NAD^{+}) as its cofactor.
