= Saflufenacil =

Names
- Preferred IUPAC name 2-Chloro-4-fluoro-5-[3-methyl-2,6-dioxo-4-(trifluoromethyl)-3,6-dihydropyrimidin-1(2H)-yl]-N-[methyl(propan-2-yl)sulfamoyl]benzamide

Identifiers
CAS Number	372137-35-4
3D model (JSmol)	Interactive image
ChEBI	CHEBI:142824
ChemSpider	9746162
ECHA InfoCard	100.124.700
PubChem CID	11571392
UNII	189U20M808
CompTox Dashboard (EPA)	DTXSID9058072
- InChI: InChI=1S/C17H17ClF4N4O5S/c1-8(2)25(4)32(30,31)23-15(28)9-5-12(11(19)6-10(9)18)26-14(27)7-13(17(20,21)22)24(3)16(26)29/h5-8H,1-4H3,(H,23,28) Key: GNHDVXLWBQYPJE-UHFFFAOYSA-N
- SMILES: CC(C)N(C)S(=O)(=O)NC(=O)C1=CC(=C(C=C1Cl)F)N2C(=O)C=C(N(C2=O)C)C(F)(F)F

Properties
Chemical formula	C_{17}H_{17}ClF_{4}N_{4}O_{5}S
Molar mass	500.85 g·mol^{−1}
Density	1.595 g/mL
Melting point	189.9 °C (373.8 °F; 463.0 K)
Solubility in water	2100 mg/L (20 °C)

Hazards
- GHS labelling
Pictograms	(GHS09: Environmental hazard)
Signal word	Warning
Hazard statements	H410
Precautionary statements	P273, P391, P501
- Except where otherwise noted, data are given for materials in their standard state (at 25 °C [77 °F], 100 kPa). Infobox references

Saflufenacil is the ISO common name for an organic compound of the pyrimidinedione chemical class used as an herbicide. It acts by inhibiting the enzyme protoporphyrinogen oxidase to control broadleaf weeds in crops including soybeans and corn.

== History ==
In 1985, chemists at the Dr R. Maag subsidiary of Hoffmann-La Roche filed patents to 3-aryl uracil derivatives which had herbicidal activity. The work was continued by Ciba-Geigy and further patents claiming additional esters were published, including to butafenacil (CGA276854), which was marketed in 2001. BASF scientists investigated the chemistry and patented an analog where the carboxylic ester of butafenacil was replaced by a sulfamoyl carboxamide. It was developed under the code number BAS800H and first marketed in 2008 with the brand name Kixor.

== Synthesis ==

As described in the BASF patent, the key step in the preparation of saflufenacil involved the reaction between a substituted aniline and an oxazinone. 2-chloro-4-fluoro-5-aminobenzoic acid and 2-dimethylamino-4-(trifluoromethyl)-6H-1,3-oxazin-6-one were heated in acetic acid to form the ring systems of the herbicide in over 90% yield, with further standard chemical transformations to generate the final product.

== Mechanism of action ==
Saflufenacil works by inhibiting protoporphyrinogen IX oxidase (PPO), preventing chlorophyll formation, and resulting in accumulation of protoporphyrin IX which is a potent photosensitizer. This activates oxygen, causing lipid peroxidation with rapid loss of membrane integrity and function. The effects visible on whole plants are chlorosis and necrosis. In corn and some varieties of soyabean the effects are insufficient to cause serious damage, leading to useful selectivity.

== Usage ==
Saflufenacil is registered for use in the United States, where the Environmental Protection Agency (EPA) is responsible for regulating pesticides under the Federal Insecticide, Fungicide, and Rodenticide Act (FIFRA), the Food Quality Protection Act (FQPA) and the Pesticide Registration Improvement Act (PRIA). A pesticide can only be used legally according to the directions on the label that is included at the time of the sale.

The herbicide controls only broadleaf weeds but is effective both pre- and post-emergence on a very wide range of these species including Abutilon theophrasti, Acalypha virginica, Acanthospermum hispidum, Amaranthus hybridus, Amaranthus palmeri, Amaranthus powellii, Amaranthus retroflexus, Ambrosia artemisiifolia, Chenopodium album, Conyza canadensis, Datura stramonium, Galinsoga parviflora, Helianthus annuus, Hibiscus trionum, Ipomoea hederacea, Ipomoea purpurea, Kochia scoparia, Mollugo verticillata, Physalis angulata, Polygonum convolvulus, Polygonum persicaria, Portulaca oleracea, Richardia scabra, Salsola kali, Sicyos angulatus, Sinapis arvensis, Solanum nigrum, Stellaria media, Thlaspi arvense, Tribulus terrestris and Xanthium strumarium. The product is typically used at application rates of 0.1 lb a.i. per acre and may also be applied for crop desiccation pre-harvest.

The estimated annual use of saflufenacil in US agriculture is mapped by the US Geological Service and shows that in 2018, the latest date for which figures are available, approximately 600,000 pounds (270,000 kg) were applied — mainly in corn and soybean. The compound is also registered for use in Australia but not in the European Union.
