= Sirohaem synthase =

CysG_dimerisation region
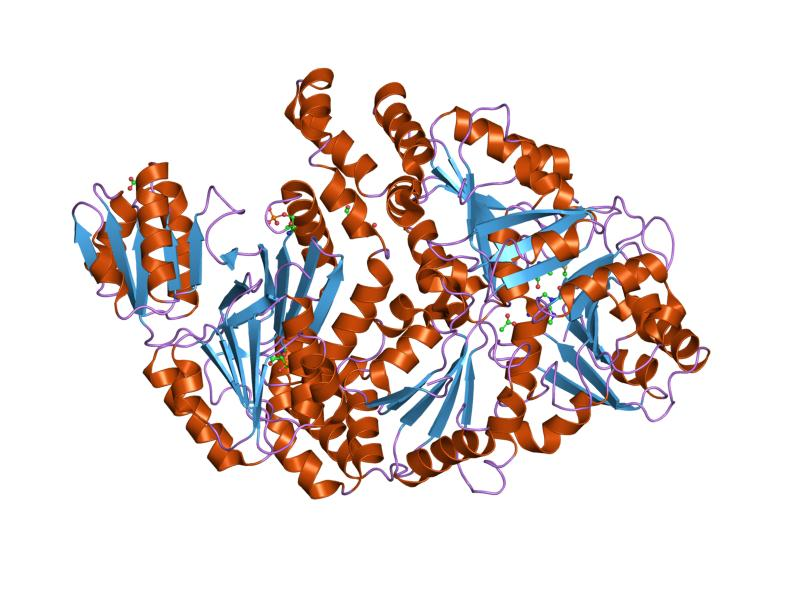
- structure and function of cysg, the multifunctional methyltransferase/dehydrogenase/ferrochelatase for siroheme synthesis

Identifiers
- Symbol: CysG_dimeriser
- Pfam: PF10414
- InterPro: IPR019478
Available protein structures:
- PDB: IPR019478 PF10414 (ECOD; PDBsum)
- AlphaFold: IPR019478; PF10414

In molecular biology, sirohaem synthase (or siroheme synthase) (CysG) is a multi-functional enzyme with S-adenosyl-L-methionine (SAM)-dependent bismethyltransferase, dehydrogenase and ferrochelatase activities. Bacterial sulphur metabolism depends on the iron-containing porphinoid sirohaem. CysG synthesizes sirohaem from uroporphyrinogen III via reactions which encompass two branchpoint intermediates in tetrapyrrole biosynthesis, diverting flux first from protoporphyrin IX biosynthesis and then from cobalamin (vitamin B12) biosynthesis. CysG is a dimer. Its dimerisation region is 74 amino acids long, and acts to hold the two structurally similar protomers held together asymmetrically through a number of salt-bridges across complementary residues within the dimerisation region. CysG dimerisation produces a series of active sites, accounting for CysG's multi-functionality, catalysing four diverse reactions:

- Two SAM-dependent methylations
- NAD+-dependent tetrapyrrole dehydrogenation
- Metal chelation
