= Sirohydrochlorin =

Identifiers
CAS Number	65207-12-7
3D model (JSmol)	Interactive image
ChEBI	CHEBI:18023
ChemSpider	26333123
KEGG	C05778
PubChem CID	196427
- InChI: InChI=1S/C42H46N4O16/c1-41(17-39(59)60)23(5-9-35(51)52)29-14-27-21(11-37(55)56)19(3-7-33(47)48)25(43-27)13-26-20(4-8-34(49)50)22(12-38(57)58)28(44-26)15-31-42(2,18-40(61)62)24(6-10-36(53)54)30(46-31)16-32(41)45-29/h13-16,23-24,44-45H,3-12,17-18H2,1-2H3,(H,47,48)(H,49,50)(H,51,52)(H,53,54)(H,55,56)(H,57,58)(H,59,60)(H,61,62)/b25-13-,29-14-,31-15-,32-16-/t23-,24-,41+,42+/m1/s1 Key: KWIZRXMMFRBUML-AHGFGAHVSA-N; Key: AVBHZKNQGDKVEA-ZTKUHGNGSA-N
- SMILES: C[C@@]1(CC(=O)O)c2cc3[nH]c(cc4nc(cc5[nH]c(cc(n2)[C@H]1CCC(=O)O)[C@@](C)(CC(=O)O)[C@@H]5CCC(=O)O)C(CC(=O)O)=C4CCC(=O)O)c(CCC(=O)O)c3CC(=O)O

Properties
Chemical formula	C_{42}H_{46}N_{4}O_{16}
Appearance	yellow solid
- Except where otherwise noted, data are given for materials in their standard state (at 25 °C [77 °F], 100 kPa). Infobox references

Sirohydrochlorin is a tetrapyrrole macrocyclic metabolic intermediate in the biosynthesis of sirohaem, the iron-containing prosthetic group in sulfite reductase enzymes. It is also the biosynthetic precursor to cofactor F430, a cofactor which catalyzes the release of methane in the final step of methanogenesis.

== Structure ==
Sirohydrochlorin was first isolated in the early 1970s when it was shown to be the metal-free form of the prosthetic group in the ferredoxin-nitrite reductase from spinach. Its chemical identity was established by spectroscopy and by total synthesis.

== Biosynthesis ==
Sirohydrochlorin is derived from a tetrapyrrolic structural framework created by the enzymes deaminase and cosynthetase which transform aminolevulinic acid via porphobilinogen and hydroxymethylbilane to uroporphyrinogen III. The latter is the first macrocyclic intermediate common to haem, chlorophyll, sirohaem and vitamin B_{12}. Uroporphyrinogen III is subsequently transformed by the addition of two methyl groups to form dihydrosirohydrochlorin and this is oxidised by precorrin-2 dehydrogenase to give sirohydrochlorin.

dihydrosirohydrochlorin
+ NAD^{+}
H^{+}
H^{+}
sirohydrochlorin
+ NADH

The enzyme uses oxidised nicotinamide adenine dinucleotide (NAD^{+}) as its cofactor.

== Biochemical transformations ==
The enzyme sirohydrochlorin ferrochelatase catalyzes insertion of iron into sirohydrochlorin to form siroheme.

sirohydrochlorin
Fe^{2+}
2 H^{+}
Fe^{2+}
2 H^{+}
siroheme

Sirohydrochlorin cobaltochelatase inserts cobalt instead of iron.
