= Crop desiccation =

Drying crops before harvest

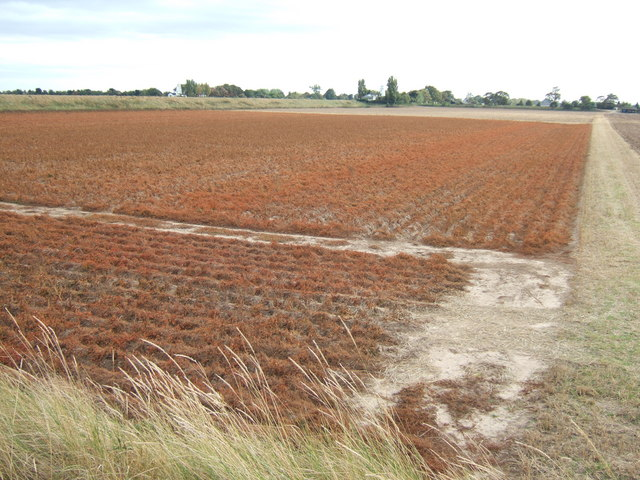
Desiccated potato plants prior to harvest

Pre-harvest crop desiccation is the application of an agent to a crop just before harvest to kill the leaves and/or plants so that the crop dries out from environmental conditions, or "dry-down", more quickly and evenly. Crop desiccants (not to be confused with chemical desiccants) include herbicides and defoliants, used to accelerate the natural drying of plant tissues. Desiccation of crops through the use of herbicides is practiced worldwide on a variety of food and non-food crops.

== Uses ==
Crop desiccation can improve the efficiency and economics of mechanical harvesting. In grain crops such as wheat, barley and oats, uniformly dried crops do not have to be windrowed (swathed and dried) prior to harvest, but can easily be straight-cut and harvested. This saves the farmer time and money, which is important in northern regions where the growing season is short. In a non-food crop such as cotton, reliance on natural frost may be too late to be effective in some regions. Thus leaves that remain on the cotton plant will interfere with mechanical harvesters and stain the white cotton resulting in a lower quality grade; herbicides which cause both defoliation and desiccation reduce these problems.

Desiccation can improve the uniformity of a crop. It may correct for uneven crop growth which is a problem in northern climates, during wet summers, or when weed control is poor. Plants that have naturally reached the end of their maturation may be mingled with plants in earlier stages of growth; controlled desiccation evens that out. This also increases uniformity of moisture content in grain, which has positive economic benefits in the storage of the grain and the price of the grain.

Desiccation can enhance the ripening of a crop. With sugarcane, for example, glyphosate application increases sucrose concentration before harvest. With grains, for example, as a consequence of crop plant uniformity as noted above, grain ripeness can be made more uniform through the same process.

Several additional advantages of desiccation have been cited: harvest can be conducted earlier; weed control is initiated for a future crop; earlier ripening allows for earlier replanting; desiccation reduces green material in the harvest putting less strain on harvesting machinery.

Examples of crops that may be subjected to pre-harvest desiccation include:

- Cereals/Grains such as barley, oats, rice, sorghum (millet), and wheat
- Flax
- Cotton
- Legumes including beans (common, fava, garbanzos, etc.), lentils, peas, and soybeans
- Maize (corn)
- Mustard
- Oilseed such as canola, linseed, rapeseed, safflower, sunflower, and soy
- Potato
- Sugarcane
- Sunflower

== Active agents ==
In agricultural parlance, desiccation is divided into two distinct groups: "true desiccants" and pre-harvest systemic herbicides. True desiccants are not chemical desiccants, rather they are contact herbicides which kill only the parts of the plant they touch. They induce plant death/defoliation rapidly and dry down occurs within a few days. True desiccants do not often provide good weed control because killing only the top growth may allow plants to begin re-growing again. In contrast, systemic herbicides are absorbed by foliage or roots and translocated to other parts of the plant. They poison metabolism throughout the plant thus the process is slower, with die off and dry down taking up to a couple weeks.

=== "True desiccants" ===
Most of these kinds of contact herbicides are cell membrane disruptors that are either "PPO inhibitors" or "Photosystem I inhibitors." Plant cells have chloroplasts, which contain the protoporphyrinogen oxidase (PPO) enzyme complex. PPO inhibitors poison that enzyme, causing a build up of Protoporphyrin IX (Proto). Normally Proto is present in very low amounts, but when there is too much Proto it interacts with light to form singlet oxygen radicals (^{1}O_{2}). These interact with the fatty acids of membranes, causing disruption of membrane integrity and leakage of cell contents. The plants soon begin to wilt and quickly dry out in the sun. Plants can burn within hours of exposure to these herbicides. In contrast, Photosystem I inhibitors such as diquat and paraquat work by entering plant cells and immediately diverting electrons away from photosynthetic chain, poisoning photosynthesis. In addition, hydroxyl radicals (•OH) are formed which interact with the fatty acids of membranes, causing disruption of membranes, leakage, plant wilting, and drying out in the sun.

Contact herbicides used for desiccation include: carfentrazone-ethyl, cyclanilide, diquat, endothall, glufosinate, paraquat, pelargonic acid / ammonium nonanoate, pyraflufen-ethyl, saflufenacil, sodium chlorate, thidiazuron, and tribufos. The most common and widely used contact desiccant is diquat (Reglone).

For potatoes, sulfuric acid is sometimes used as a non-herbicide chemical desiccating agent.

=== Systemic desiccants (glyphosate) ===
Glyphosate (Roundup) is the principal pre-harvest systemic herbicide used for desiccation of a wide variety of crops. As a systemic herbicide it is not a true desiccant as it can take weeks rather than days for the crop to die back and dry out after application.

Glyphosate works by poisoning the shikimate pathway which is found in plants and microorganisms but not in animals. Specifically, it inhibits the EPSP synthase enzyme which is required for plants to make certain amino acids. Without these, metabolism in the plant collapses. In addition, shikimate accumulates in plant tissues and diverts energy and resources away from other processes, eventually killing the plant over a period of days to weeks.

In the UK, glyphosate began to be applied to wheat crops in the 1980s to control perennial weeds such as common couch which was very effective and meant that sowing of the next crop could occur sooner. Use as a harvest aid in the UK increased after the introduction of strobilurin fungicides which prolong the longevity of the leaves, and by 2002, 12% of UK wheat crops were treated in this way.

The timing of application is crucial as the moisture content of the grain must be below 30% for the yield of the crop to be unaffected and to minimize uptake of glyphosate by the grain. Yield may be affected and residues increased if applications are made to uneven fields in which some areas have a moisture content over 30%. Although used in weed-free and evenly maturing crops with the aim of reducing the grain moisture content more rapidly to hasten the harvest, there is little or no advantage in doing so.

The application of glyphosate differs between regions and countries significantly. In North America, for example, its use on wheat crops is uncommon in the United States but more common in Canada which has a colder climate and shorter growing season. In the UK where summers are wet and crops may ripen unevenly 78% of oilseed rape is desiccated before harvest, but only 4% in Germany.

== Questions over practice ==
Herbicide residue in food has been raised as a concern. Residue quantities are regulated by Codex Alimentarius of the Food and Agriculture Organization of the United Nations.

In July 2013 Austria banned the use of pre-harvest glyphosate citing the precautionary principle. In April 2015 an oat buyer in Western Canada announced that it was refusing oats in which pre-harvest glyphosate had been used.

Glyphosate was found in 5–15% of cereal crop samples tested in the UK between 2000 and 2004, although never exceeding the Maximum Residue Level of 20 mg/kg. A survey of British wheat in 2006-2008 found average levels of 0.05–0.22 mg/kg with maximum levels of 1.2 mg/kg.

Evidence that traces of glyphosate used on crops could make its way into a final, processed food product was raised in 2016 by a German environmental group, Munich Environmental Institute (note that this example does not distinguish between specific crop desiccation use and general use). The group issued a report that stated glyphosate was detected in Germany's 14 most popular beers, ranging from 0.46 to 29.74 micrograms per liter, noting that the German government limit for glyphosate in drinking water is 0.1 microgram per liter. However, the German government's Federal Institute for Risk Assessment made an official comment that those levels did not pose a risk to consumer's health, emphasizing that “An adult would have to drink around 1,000 liters (264 U.S. gallons) of beer a day to ingest enough quantities to be harmful for health.” An industry group, Brauer-Bund Beer Association, asserted that the results weren't credible because of insufficient sampling and that its own monitoring system for malt never detected glyphosate levels above maximum permitted levels. Separately, in 2020 scientists from the Max Rubner-Institut published a study about correlations between trace levels of glyphosate in human urine with consumption of various food types. They found no relationship between traces of glyphosate and the consumption of beer. Neither did they find an association with bread, honey, mushroom, and soy products but there was a correlation with pulses (legumes).
