= C5H9NO3 =

The molecular formula C_{5}H_{9}NO_{3} (molar mass : 131.13 g/mol) may refer to:

- Aminolevulinic acid, first compound in the porphyrin synthesis pathway
- Glutamate-1-semialdehyde
- Glutamate-5-semialdehyde
- Hydroxyproline
