= PPO inhibitor =

A PPO inhibitor may inhibit two unrelated enzymes abbreviated "PPO". They are:

- Protoporphyrinogen oxidase inhibitors — Used as herbicides
- Polyphenol oxidase inhibitors
