= CYSG =

CYSG may refer to:

- Saint-Georges Aerodrome, Quebec, Canada, ICAO airport code CYSG
- Uroporphyrinogen-III C-methyltransferase, or CysG, an enzyme
