= Precorrin-2 dehydrogenase =

Class of enzymes

precorrin-2 dehydrogenase

Identifiers
- EC no.: 1.3.1.76

Databases
- IntEnz: IntEnz view
- BRENDA: BRENDA entry
- ExPASy: NiceZyme view
- KEGG: KEGG entry
- MetaCyc: metabolic pathway
- PRIAM: profile
- PDB structures: RCSB PDB PDBe PDBsum
- Gene Ontology: AmiGO / QuickGO
Search
- PMC: articles
- PubMed: articles
- NCBI: proteins

In enzymology, precorrin-2 dehydrogenase (EC 1.3.1.76) is an enzyme that catalyzes the chemical reaction

precorrin-2
+ NAD^{+}
H^{+}
H^{+}
sirohydrochlorin
+ NADH

The two substrates of this enzyme are precorrin-2 and oxidised nicotinamide adenine dinucleotide (NAD^{+}). Its products are sirohydrochlorin, reduced NADH, and a proton.

This enzyme belongs to the family of oxidoreductases, specifically those acting on the CH-CH group of donor with NAD+ or NADP+ as acceptor. The systematic name of this enzyme class is precorrin-2:NAD+ oxidoreductase. Other names in common use include Met8p, SirC, and CysG. This enzyme is part of the biosynthetic pathway to cobalamin (vitamin B_{12}) in anaerobic bacteria and to Cofactor F430.

== See also ==
- Cobalamin biosynthesis
