= Sirohydrochlorin ferrochelatase =

Enzyme

sirohydrochlorin ferrochelatase

Identifiers
- EC no.: 4.99.1.4

Databases
- IntEnz: IntEnz view
- BRENDA: BRENDA entry
- ExPASy: NiceZyme view
- KEGG: KEGG entry
- MetaCyc: metabolic pathway
- PRIAM: profile
- PDB structures: RCSB PDB PDBe PDBsum
- Gene Ontology: AmiGO / QuickGO
Search
- PMC: articles
- PubMed: articles
- NCBI: proteins

The enzyme sirohydrochlorin ferrochelatase (EC 4.99.1.4) catalyzes the following reaction:

sirohydrochlorin
Fe^{2+}
2 H^{+}
Fe^{2+}
2 H^{+}
siroheme

This enzyme belongs to the family of lyases, to be specific the "catch-all" class of lyases that do not fit into any other sub-class. The systematic name of this enzyme class is siroheme ferro-lyase (sirohydrochlorin-forming). The enzyme is also known as SirB and present in all plants and nitrate and sulfate assimilating/dissimilating bacteria. Siroheme is a co-factor of both assimilatory and dissimilatory nitrite and sulfite reductases. It is synthesized from the central tetrapyrrole molecule uroporphyrinogen III, which forms the first branch-point of tetrapyrrole biosynthetic pathway, the other branch being the heme/chlorophyll branch. The siroheme branch consists of three steps: methylation, dehydrogenation, and ferrochelation, with the last step carried out by sirohydrochlorin ferrochelatase.

Sirohydrochlorin ferrochelatase is a class II chelatase, i.e. it does not require ATP for its activity unlike class I chelatases such as Mg-chelatase. In E. coli, all three steps of siroheme biosynthesis are carried out by a single multifunctional enzyme called CysG, while in yeast Saccharomyces cerevisiae the last two steps are carried out by a bifunctional enzyme called Met8p. CysG and Met8p share common folds but are unrelated to SirB and constitute the so-called class III chelatase. SirB belongs to CbiX family protein and the plant SirB is half the length of bacterial SirB and aligns with its N- and C-terminal halves suggesting that the longer form evolved from the gene duplication and fusion of the shorter form.

Sirohydrochlorin ferrochelatase in all land plants and certain green algae, but not bacteria or other algae, consists of an iron sulfur cluster, which can switch between [2Fe-2S] and [4Fe-4S] forms depending on the redox status of the cellular milieu. Although it is not clearly determined what role this switching of the cluster might play, it is postulated to be involved in a critical redox regulation of siroheme biosynthesis.
