= Iron deficiency (plant disorder) =

Plant disorder

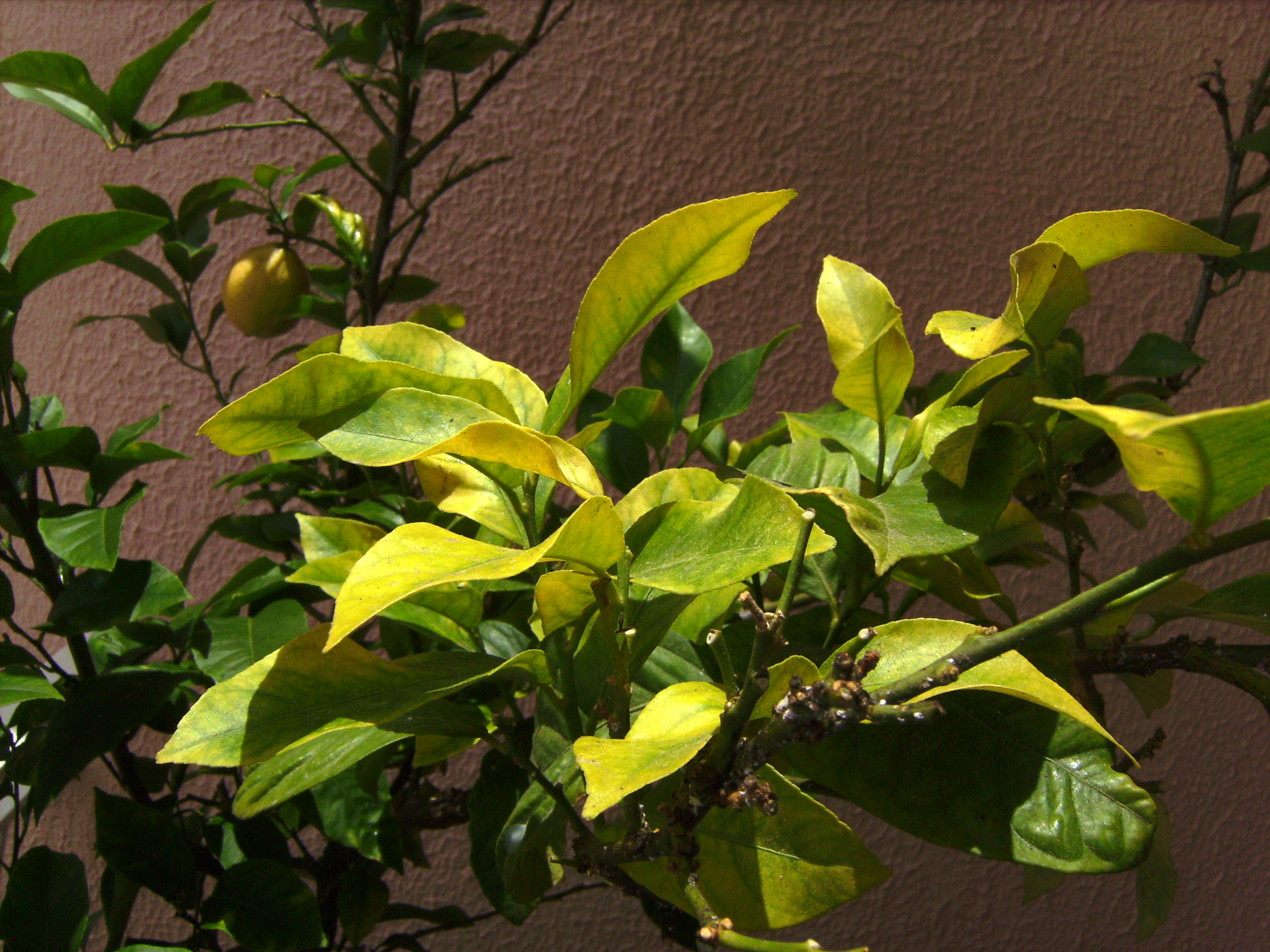
Iron deficiency showing chlorotic leaves in a lemon tree. Compare yellow chlorotic leaves with the green non chlorotic leaves at left of this image

Iron (Fe) deficiency is a plant disorder also known as "lime-induced chlorosis". It can be confused with manganese deficiency. If soil iron concentration is high, in spite of this it can become unavailable for absorption if soil pH is higher than 6.5. Excess of elements such as manganese in the soil can interfere with plant iron uptake triggering iron deficiency.

Iron is needed to produce chlorophyll, hence its deficiency causes chlorosis. For example, iron is used in the active site of glutamyl-tRNA reductase, an enzyme needed for the formation of 5-Aminolevulinic acid which is a precursor of heme and chlorophyll.

== Symptoms ==
Yellowing (Chlorosis) occur in the newly emerging leaves instead of the older leaves and usually seen in the interveinal region. Fruit would be of poor quality and quantity. Chlorosis occurs in younger leaves because iron is not a mobile element, and as such, the younger leaves cannot draw iron from other areas of the plant. Over time, the yellowing may even turn a pale white or the whole leaf may be affected. Iron deficient plants may overaccumulate heavy metals such as cadmium. Any plant may be affected, but raspberries and pears are particularly susceptible, as well as most acid-loving plants such as azaleas and camellias.

== Treatment ==
Iron deficiency can be avoided by choosing appropriate soil for the growing conditions (e.g., avoid growing acid loving plants on lime soils), or by adding well-rotted manure or compost. If iron deficit chlorosis is suspected then check the pH of the soil with an appropriate test kit or instrument. Take a soil sample at surface and at depth. If the pH is over seven then consider soil remediation that will lower the pH toward the 6.5 - 7 range.

Remediation includes:

i) adding compost, manure, peat or similar organic matter (warning. Some retail blends of manure and compost have pH in the range 7 - 8 because of added lime. Read the MSDS if available.)

ii) applying Ammonium Sulphate as a Nitrogen fertilizer (acidifying fertilizer due to decomposition of ammonium ion to nitrate in the soil and root zone)

iii) applying elemental Sulphur to the soil (oxidizes over the course of months to produce sulphate/sulphite and lower pH).

Note: adding acid directly e.g. sulphuric/hydrochloric/citric acid is dangerous as you may mobilize metal ions in the soil that are toxic and otherwise bound. Iron can be made available immediately to the plant by the use of iron sulphate or iron chelate compounds. Two common iron chelates are Fe EDTA and Fe EDDHA. Iron sulphate (Iron(II) sulfate) and iron EDTA are only useful in soil up to PH 7.1 but they can be used as a foliar spray (Foliar feeding). Iron EDDHA is useful up to PH 9 (highly alkaline) but must be applied to the soil and in the evening to avoid photodegradation. EDTA in the soil may mobilize Lead, EDDHA does not appear to.
