= Holoprotein =

Enzyme linked with cofactor

A holoprotein or conjugated protein is an apoprotein combined with its prosthetic group.

Some enzymes do not need additional components to show full activity. Others require non-protein molecules called cofactors to be bound for activity. Cofactors can be either inorganic (e.g., metal ions and iron-sulfur clusters) or organic compounds (e.g., flavin and heme). Organic cofactors can be either coenzymes, which are released from the enzyme's active site during the reaction, or prosthetic groups, which are tightly bound to an enzyme. Organic prosthetic groups can be covalently bound (e.g., biotin in enzymes such as pyruvate carboxylase).

An example of an enzyme that contains a cofactor is carbonic anhydrase, which has a zinc cofactor bound as part of its active site. These tightly bound ions or molecules are usually found in the active site and are involved in catalysis. For example, flavin and heme cofactors are often involved in redox reactions.

Enzymes that require a cofactor but do not have one bound are called apoenzymes or apoproteins. An enzyme together with the cofactor(s) required for activity is called a holoenzyme (or haloenzyme). The term holoenzyme can also be applied to enzymes that contain multiple protein subunits, such as the DNA polymerases; here the holoenzyme is the complete complex containing all the subunits needed for activity.
