= Butafenacil =

Names
- IUPAC name 1-(Allyloxy)-2-methyl-1-oxo-2-propanyl 2-chloro-5-[3-methyl-2,6-dioxo-4-(trifluoromethyl)-3,6-dihydro-1(2H)-pyrimidinyl]benzoate

Identifiers
CAS Number	134605-64-4
3D model (JSmol)	Interactive image
ChEBI	CHEBI:143863
ChEMBL	ChEMBL1867342
ChemSpider	10001509
DrugBank	DB15261
ECHA InfoCard	100.112.043
EC Number	603-837-5
PubChem CID	11826859
UNII	7Z141CCP2R
CompTox Dashboard (EPA)	DTXSID9034365
- InChI: InChI=1S/C20H18ClF3N2O6/c1-5-8-31-17(29)19(2,3)32-16(28)12-9-11(6-7-13(12)21)26-15(27)10-14(20(22,23)24)25(4)18(26)30/h5-7,9-10H,1,8H2,2-4H3 Key: JEDYYFXHPAIBGR-UHFFFAOYSA-N
- SMILES: CC(C)(C(=O)OCC=C)OC(=O)C1=C(C=CC(=C1)N2C(=O)C=C(N(C2=O)C)C(F)(F)F)Cl

Properties
Chemical formula	C_{20}H_{18}ClF_{3}N_{2}O_{6}
Molar mass	474.82 g·mol^{−1}
Density	1.37 g/mL
Melting point	113 °C (235 °F; 386 K)
Solubility in water	10 mg/L (20 °C)
log P	3.2

Hazards
- GHS labelling
Pictograms	(GHS08: Health hazard) (GHS09: Environmental hazard)
Signal word	Warning
Hazard statements	H373, H410
Precautionary statements	P260, P273, P314, P391, P501
- Except where otherwise noted, data are given for materials in their standard state (at 25 °C [77 °F], 100 kPa). Infobox references

Butafenacil is the ISO common name for an organic compound of the pyrimidinedione chemical class used as an herbicide. It acts by inhibiting the enzyme protoporphyrinogen oxidase to control broadleaf and some grass weeds in crops including cereals and canola.

== History ==
In 1985, chemists at the Dr. R. Maag subsidiary of Hoffmann-La Roche filed patents for uracil derivatives which had herbicidal activity. In 1990 the agrochemical interests of Maag were sold to Ciba-Geigy and work continued to optimise this area of biological activity. By 1993 a patent claiming specific ester derivatives including butafenacil was published. This was developed for the market under the code number CGA276854 and launched in 2001. By that time, further mergers in the industry meant that the product was supplied by Syngenta with brand names including B Power.

== Synthesis ==
The key step in butafenacil synthesis

As described in the Ciba-Geigy patent, the key step in the preparation of butafenacil is the reaction between an aromatic ring isocyanate and an alkenylamine. Ethyl 2-chloro-5-isocyanato-benzoate and ethyl 3-amino-4,4,4-trifluorocrotonate were reacted in the presence of a base to form a substituted urea intermediate which was cyclised to the pyrimidinedione, as shown. Further standard chemical transformations generated the final product.

== Mechanism of action ==
Butafenacil works by inhibiting protoporphyrinogen IX oxidase (PPO), preventing chlorophyll formation, and resulting in the accumulation of protoporphyrin IX which is a potent photosensitizer. This activates oxygen, causing lipid peroxidation with rapid loss of membrane integrity and function. The effects visible on whole plants are chlorosis and necrosis.

Butafenacil's HRAC herbicide resistance class is Group G, (Aus), E (Global), 14 (Numeric).

== Usage ==
Butafenacil is registered for use in Australia, Argentina, Brazil, Japan, and Thailand but not now in the European Union or USA, although it was conditionally given approval there in 2003.

The herbicide controls annual and perennial broadleaf weeds and some grasses. It has little selectivity so is usually applied before sowing crop seeds. It is effective post-emergence on a very wide range of species including Arctotheca calendula, Avena fatua, Bidens pilosa, Boerhavia diffusa, Brassica napus, Brassica tournefortii, Bromus diandrus, Capsella bursa-pastoris, Carthamus lanatus, Chenopodium album, Chenopodium pumilio, Cirsium acaule, Echinochloa crus-galli, Emex australis, Erodium botrys, Erodium cicutarium, Festuca arundinacea, Hordeum leporinum, Hypochaeris radicata, Lamium amplexicaule, Lolium rigidum, Lupinus angustifolius, Malva parviflora, Medicago sativa, Modiola caroliniana, Panicum capillare, Panicum effusum, Phalaris paradoxa, Polygonum aviculare, Portulaca oleracea, Raphanus raphanistrum, Rapistrum rugosum, Rumex acetosella, Rumex crispus, Salvia reflexa, Sisymbrium orientale, Sonchus oleraceus, Tribulus terrestris, Urochloa panicoides, Urtica urens, Vicia sativa and Vulpia bromoides. The product is typically used at application rates of 10 g a.i. per hectare, often in combination with other herbicides such as paraquat and glyphosate in direct drilling of cereals and canola.

== Human safety ==
The LD_{50} of butafenacil is over 5000 mg/kg (rats, oral), which means that it is of low toxicity by oral ingestion. The toxicity of protoporphyrinogen oxidase inhibitors has been reviewed.
