= Iron loss =

Iron loss may refer to:

- Core loss in electrical machines
- A cause of iron deficiency in living organisms
