= Glutamate-1-semialdehyde 2,1-aminomutase =

glutamate-1-semialdehyde 2,1-aminomutase
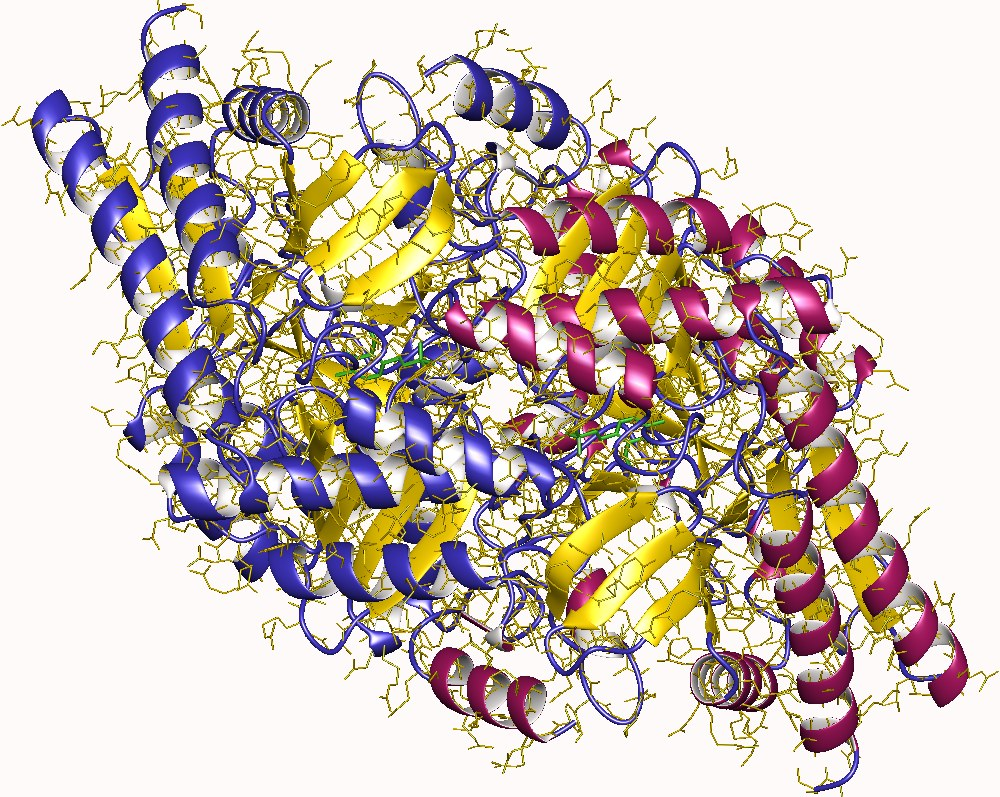
- 2epj, Aeropyrum pernix (Archaea)

Identifiers
- EC no.: 5.4.3.8
- CAS no.: 68518-07-0

Databases
- IntEnz: IntEnz view
- BRENDA: BRENDA entry
- ExPASy: NiceZyme view
- KEGG: KEGG entry
- MetaCyc: metabolic pathway
- PRIAM: profile
- PDB structures: RCSB PDB PDBe PDBsum
- Gene Ontology: AmiGO / QuickGO
Search
- PMC: articles
- PubMed: articles
- NCBI: proteins

In enzymology, glutamate-1-semialdehyde 2,1-aminomutase (EC 5.4.3.8) is an enzyme that catalyzes the chemical reaction

glutamate-1-semialdehyde
aminolevulinic acid

The enzyme converts its substrate, glutamate-1-semialdehyde into aminolevulinic acid.

This enzyme belongs to the family of isomerases, specifically those intramolecular transferases transferring amino groups. The systematic name of this enzyme class is (S)-4-amino-5-oxopentanoate 4,5-aminomutase. This enzyme is also called glutamate-1-semialdehyde aminotransferase. This enzyme participates in porphyrin and chlorophyll biosynthesis. It employs one cofactor, pyridoxal phosphate.

== Structural studies ==
As of late 2007, 10 structures have been solved for this class of enzymes, with PDB accession codes 2CFB, 2E7U, 2EPJ, 2GSA, 2HOY, 2HOZ, 2HP1, 2HP2, 3GSB, and 4GSA.
