= Nitrite reductase (NAD(P)H) =

Class of enzymes

nitrite reductase [NAD(P)H]

Identifiers
- EC no.: 1.7.1.4
- CAS no.: 9029-29-2

Databases
- BRENDA: enzyme data
- ExPASy: NiceZyme view
- KEGG: enzyme entry
- MetaCyc: metabolic pathway
- Rhea: reactions
- PDB structures: RCSB PDB PDBe PDBsum
- Gene Ontology: AmiGO / QuickGO
Search
- PMC: articles
- PubMed: articles
- NCBI: proteins

In enzymology, a nitrite reductase [NAD(P)H] (EC 1.7.1.4) is an enzyme that catalyzes the chemical reaction

ammonium hydroxide + 3 NAD(P)^{+} + H_{2}O $\rightleftharpoons$ nitrite + 3 NAD(P)H + 3 H^{+}

The 4 substrates of this enzyme are ammonium hydroxide, NAD^{+}, NADP^{+}, and H_{2}O, whereas its 4 products are nitrite, NADH, NADPH, and H^{+}.

This enzyme belongs to the family of oxidoreductases, specifically those acting on other nitrogenous compounds as donors with NAD+ or NADP+ as acceptor. The systematic name of this enzyme class is ammonium-hydroxide:NAD(P)+ oxidoreductase. Other names in common use include nitrite reductase (reduced nicotinamide adenine dinucleotide, (phosphate)), NADH-nitrite oxidoreductase, NADPH-nitrite reductase, assimilatory nitrite reductase, nitrite reductase [NAD(P)H2], and NAD(P)H2:nitrite oxidoreductase. This enzyme participates in nitrogen metabolism. It has 3 cofactors: FAD, Iron, and Siroheme.

== Structural studies ==
As of late 2007, only one structure has been solved for this class of enzymes, with the PDB accession code PDB: 2JO6.
