= Glutamate-1-semialdehyde =

Names
- Preferred IUPAC name (4S)-4-Amino-5-oxopentanoic acid

Identifiers
CAS Number	68462-55-5
3D model (JSmol)	Interactive image
ChemSpider	114525
MeSH	glutamate-1-semialdehyde
PubChem CID	129297
UNII	6KX9PX9562
CompTox Dashboard (EPA)	DTXSID40903985
- InChI: InChI=1S/C5H9NO3/c6-4(3-7)1-2-5(8)9/h3-4H,1-2,6H2,(H,8,9)/t4-/m0/s1 Key: MPUUQNGXJSEWTF-BYPYZUCNSA-N; InChI=1/C5H9NO3/c6-4(3-7)1-2-5(8)9/h3-4H,1-2,6H2,(H,8,9)/t4-/m0/s1 Key: MPUUQNGXJSEWTF-BYPYZUCNBY
- SMILES: C(CC(=O)O)[C@@H](C=O)N

Properties
Chemical formula	C_{5}H_{9}NO_{3}
Molar mass	131.131 g·mol^{−1}
- Except where otherwise noted, data are given for materials in their standard state (at 25 °C [77 °F], 100 kPa). verify (what is ?) Infobox references

Glutamate-1-semialdehyde is a molecule formed from by the reduction of tRNA bound glutamate, catalyzed by glutamyl-tRNA reductase. It is isomerized by glutamate-1-semialdehyde 2,1-aminomutase to give aminolevulinic acid in the biosynthesis of porphyrins, including heme and chlorophyll.

glutamate-1-semialdehyde
aminolevulinic acid

== See also ==
- Glutamate-5-semialdehyde
