= Precorrin-2 C20-methyltransferase =

precorrin-2 C20-methyltransferase

Identifiers
- EC no.: 2.1.1.130

Databases
- IntEnz: IntEnz view
- BRENDA: BRENDA entry
- ExPASy: NiceZyme view
- KEGG: KEGG entry
- MetaCyc: metabolic pathway
- PRIAM: profile
- PDB structures: RCSB PDB PDBe PDBsum
- Gene Ontology: AmiGO / QuickGO
Search
- PMC: articles
- PubMed: articles
- NCBI: proteins

In enzymology, precorrin-2 C20-methyltransferase (EC 2.1.1.130) is an enzyme that catalyzes the chemical reaction

precorrin-2
+ SAM
precorrin-3A
+ SAH

This methylation reaction converts precorrin-2 into precorrin-3A. The methyl group comes from the cofactor, S-adenosyl methionine (SAM), which gives S-adenosyl-L-homocysteine (SAH).

The enzyme belongs to the family of transferases, specifically those transferring one-carbon group methyltransferases. The systematic name of this enzyme class is S-adenosyl-L-methionine:precorrin-4 C20-methyltransferase and another names in common use is CobI. It is part of the biosynthetic pathway to cobalamin (vitamin B_{12}) in aerobic bacteria.

== Structural studies ==
As of late 2007, two structures have been solved for this class of enzymes, with PDB accession codes 2E0K and 2E0N.

== See also ==
- Cobalamin biosynthesis
- Cobalt-factor II C20-methyltransferase for enzyme that gives the same reaction in anaerobic organisms
