= Cobalt-factor II C20-methyltransferase =

Identifiers
- EC no.: 2.1.1.151

Databases
- IntEnz: IntEnz view
- BRENDA: BRENDA entry
- ExPASy: NiceZyme view
- KEGG: KEGG entry
- MetaCyc: metabolic pathway
- PRIAM: profile
- PDB structures: RCSB PDB PDBe PDBsum
- Gene Ontology: AmiGO / QuickGO
Search
- PMC: articles
- PubMed: articles
- NCBI: proteins

Cobalt-factor II C20-methyltransferase (EC 2.1.1.151) is an enzyme that catalyzes the chemical reaction

cobalt-precorrin-2
+ SAM
cobalt-precorrin-3
+ SAH

This is a methylation reaction in which cobalt-precorrin-2 is converted to cobalt-precorrin-2. The methyl group comes from the cofactor, S-adenosyl methionine (SAM), which becomes S-adenosyl-L-homocysteine (SAH). The enzyme was characterised from Salmonella typhimurium.

This enzyme belongs to the family of transferases, specifically those transferring one-carbon group methyltransferases. The systematic name of this enzyme class is S-adenosyl-L-methionine:cobalt-factor-II C20-methyltransferase. This enzyme is also called CbiL. It is part of the biosynthetic pathway to cobalamin (vitamin B_{12}) in anaerobic bacteria such as Salmonella typhimurium and Bacillus megaterium.

== See also ==
- Cobalamin biosynthesis
- Precorrin-2 C20-methyltransferase for enzyme that gives the same reaction in aerobic organisms
