= Ferrochelatase =

Protoporphyrin ferrochelatase
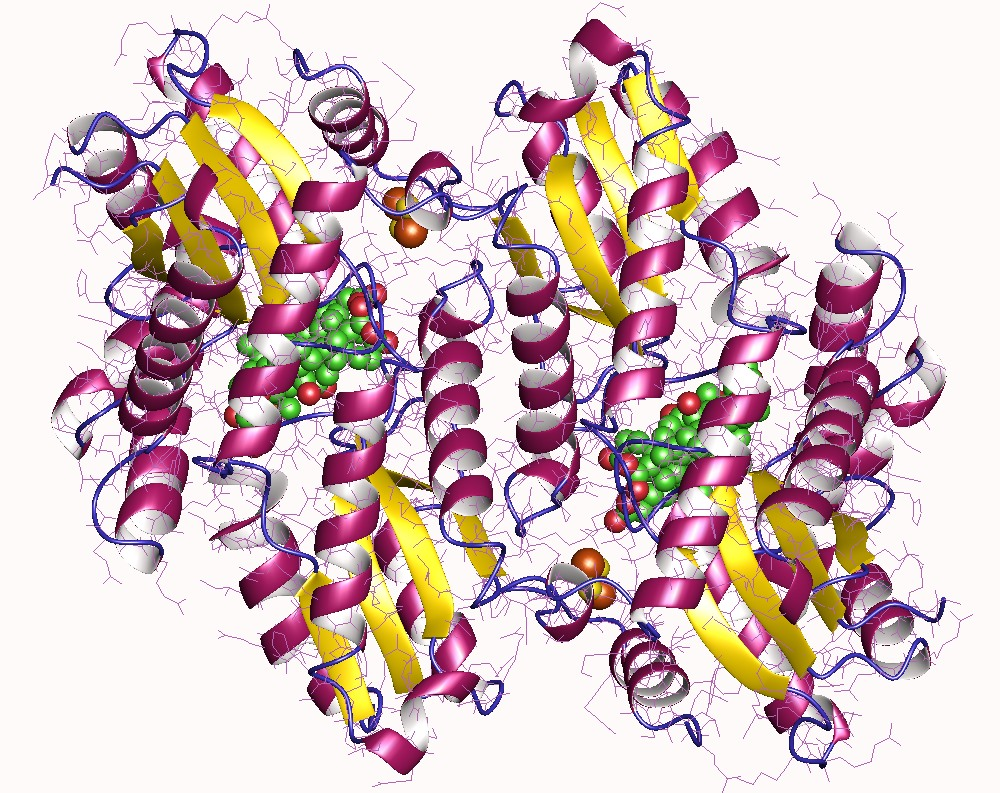
- Ferrochelatase homodimer, Human

Identifiers
- EC no.: 4.98.1.1
- CAS no.: 9012-93-5

Databases
- BRENDA: enzyme data
- ExPASy: NiceZyme view
- KEGG: enzyme entry
- MetaCyc: metabolic pathway
- Rhea: reactions
- PDB structures: RCSB PDB PDBe PDBsum
- Gene Ontology: AmiGO / QuickGO
Search
- PMC: articles
- PubMed: articles
- NCBI: proteins

FECH

Identifiers
- Aliases: FECH, EPP, FCE, ferrochelatase, EPP1
- External IDs: OMIM: 612386; MGI: 95513; GeneCards: FECH
Available structures
PDB	Ortholog search: PDBe RCSB
PDB	List of PDB id codes 4MK4, 1HRK, 2HRC, 2HRE, 2PNJ, 2PO5, 2PO7, 2QD1, 2QD2, 2QD3, 2QD4, 2QD5, 3AQI, 3HCN, 3HCO, 3HCP, 3HCR, 3W1W, 4F4D, 4KLA, 4KLC, 4KLR, 4KMM
Enzyme activity
EC #	BRENDA	ExPASy	KEGG	MetaCyc
4.98.1.1	↗	↗	↗	↗

Gene location (Human)
Chr.	Chromosome 18 (human)
Band	18q21.31	Start	57,544,377 bp
Band	18q21.31	End	57,586,732 bp

Gene location (Mouse)
Chr.	Chromosome 18 (mouse)
Band	18 E1|18 37.43 cM	Start	64,585,985 bp
Band	18 E1|18 37.43 cM	End	64,623,322 bp

RNA expression pattern
Bgee	Human / Mouse (ortholog); Top expressed in: trabecular bone; bone marrow; bone marrow cell; monocyte; muscle of leg; gastrocnemius muscle; glutes; Skeletal muscle tissue of biceps brachii; muscle of thigh; Skeletal muscle tissue of rectus abdominis / Top expressed in: blood; fetal liver hematopoietic progenitor cell; tibiofemoral joint; human fetus; atrium; internal carotid artery; sternocleidomastoid muscle; right ventricle; muscle of thigh; external carotid artery; More reference expression data
BioGPS	More reference expression data
Gene ontology
Molecular function	iron-sulfur cluster binding; metal ion binding; protein binding; ferrochelatase activity; lyase activity; ferrous iron binding; 2 iron, 2 sulfur cluster binding
Cellular component	membrane; mitochondrial matrix; mitochondrial inner membrane; mitochondrion
Biological process	response to platinum ion; response to light stimulus; response to metal ion; response to arsenic-containing substance; generation of precursor metabolites and energy; cellular response to dexamethasone stimulus; porphyrin-containing compound biosynthetic process; response to lead ion; protoporphyrinogen IX metabolic process; response to insecticide; response to methylmercury; response to ethanol; heme biosynthetic process
Sources:Amigo / QuickGO
Orthologs
Databases	NCBI: entry; OMA: entry
Species	Human	Mouse
Entrez	2235	14151
Ensembl	ENSG00000066926	ENSMUSG00000024588
UniProt	P22830	P22315; Q544X6
RefSeq (mRNA)	NM_000140; NM_001012515; NM_001371094; NM_001371095; NM_001374778	NM_007998; NM_001348055
RefSeq (protein)	NP_000131; NP_001012533; NP_001358023; NP_001358024; NP_001361707	NP_001334984; NP_032024
Location (UCSC)	Chr 18: 57.54 – 57.59 Mb	Chr 18: 64.59 – 64.62 Mb
PubMed search
- Wikidata
View/Edit Human	View/Edit Mouse

Protoporphyrin ferrochelatase
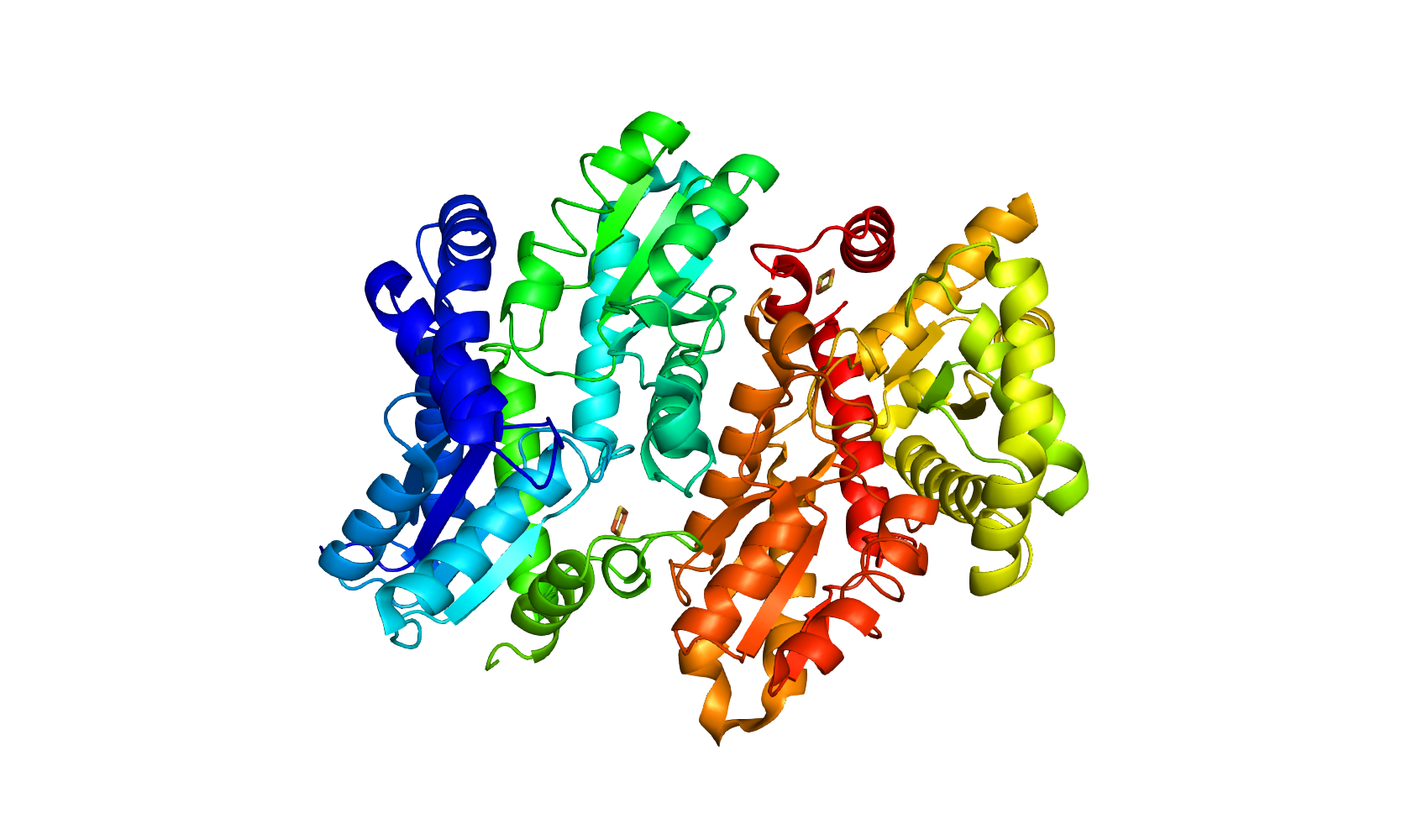
- Human ferrochelatase

Identifiers
- Symbol: Ferrochelatase
- Pfam: PF00762
- InterPro: IPR001015
- PROSITE: PDOC00462
- SCOP2: 1ak1 / SCOPe / SUPFAM
- OPM superfamily: 129
- OPM protein: 1hrk
Available protein structures:
- PDB: IPR001015 PF00762 (ECOD; PDBsum)
- AlphaFold: IPR001015; PF00762

Protoporphyrin ferrochelatase (EC 4.98.1.1, formerly EC 4.99.1.1, or ferrochelatase; systematic name protoheme ferro-lyase (protoporphyrin-forming)) is an enzyme encoded by the FECH gene in humans. Ferrochelatase catalyses the eighth and terminal step in the biosynthesis of heme, converting protoporphyrin IX into heme B. It catalyses the reaction:

protoporphyrin IX
Fe^{2+}
2 H^{+}
heme B

== Function ==
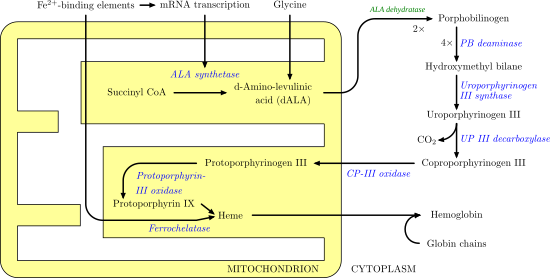
Summary of heme B biosynthesis—note that some reactions occur in the cytoplasm and some in the mitochondrion (yellow)

Ferrochelatase catalyzes the insertion of ferrous iron into protoporphyrin IX in the heme biosynthesis pathway to form heme B. The enzyme is localized to the matrix-facing side of the inner mitochondrial membrane. Ferrochelatase is the best known member of a family of enzymes that add divalent metal cations to tetrapyrrole structures. For example, magnesium chelatase adds magnesium to protoporphyrin IX in the first step of bacteriochlorophyll biosynthesis.

Heme B is an essential cofactor in many proteins and enzymes. In particular, heme b plays a key role as the oxygen carrier in hemoglobin in red blood cells and myoglobin in muscle cells. Furthermore, heme B is found in cytochrome b, a key component in Q-cytochrome c oxidoreductase (complex III) in oxidative phosphorylation.

== Structure ==
Human ferrochelatase is a homodimer composed of two 359-amino-acid polypeptide chains. It has a total molecular weight of 85.07 kDa. Each subunit is composed of five regions: a mitochondrial localization sequence, the N-terminal domain, two folded domains, and a C-terminal extension. Residues 1–62 form a mitochondrial localization domain that is cleaved in post-translational modification. The folded domains contain a total of 17 α-helices and 8 β-sheets. The C-terminal extension contains three of the four cysteine residues (Cys403, Cys406, Cys411) that coordinate the catalytic iron–sulfur cluster (2Fe-2S). The fourth coordinating cysteine resides in the N-terminal domain (Cys196).

The active pocket of ferrochelatase consists of two hydrophobic "lips" and a hydrophilic interior. The hydrophobic lips, consisting of the highly conserved residues 300–311, face the inner mitochondrial membrane and facilitate the passage of the poorly soluble protoporphyrin IX substrate and the heme product via the membrane. The interior of the active site pocket contains a highly conserved acidic surface that facilitates proton extraction from protoporphyrin. Histidine and aspartate residues roughly 20 angstroms from the center of the active site on the mitochondrial matrix side of the enzyme coordinate metal binding.

== Mechanism ==
Protoporphyrin IX with pyrrole rings lettered.

The mechanism of human protoporphyrin metalation remains under investigation. Many researchers have hypothesized distortion of the porphyrin macrocycle as key to catalysis. Researchers studying Bacillus subtilis ferrochelatase propose a mechanism for iron insertion into protoporphyrin in which the enzyme tightly grips rings B, C, and D while bending ring A 36°. Normally planar, this distortion exposes the lone pair of electrons on the nitrogen in ring A to the Fe^{+2} ion. Subsequent investigation revealed a 100° distortion in protoporphyrin bound to human ferrochelatase. A highly conserved histidine residue (His183 in B. subtilis, His263 in humans) is essential for determining the type of distortion, as well as acting as the initial proton acceptor from protoporphyrin. Anionic residues form a pathway facilitating proton movement away from the catalytic histidine. Frataxin chaperones iron to the matrix side of ferrochelatase, where aspartate and histidine residues on both proteins coordinate iron transfer into ferrochelatase. Two arginine and tyrosine residues in the active site (Arg164, Tyr165) may perform the final metalation.

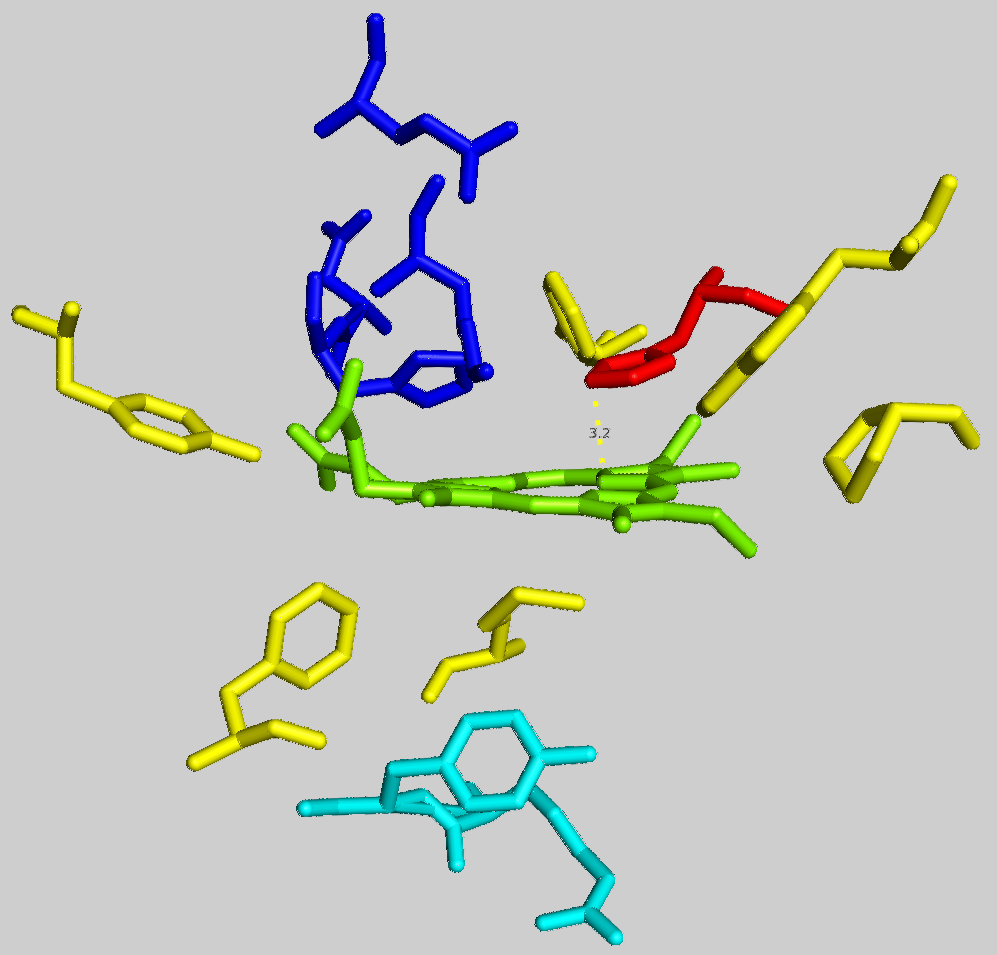
Ferrochelatase active site with protoporphyrin IX substrate in green. Residues shown are: hydrophobic groups holding protoporphyrin IX (yellow), anionic proton transfer path (dark blue), metalation residues (cyan), catalytic histidine (red).

== Clinical significance ==
Defects in ferrochelatase create a buildup of protoporphyrin IX, causing erythropoietic protoporphyria (EPP). The disease can result from a variety of mutations in FECH, most of which behave in an autosomal dominant manner with low clinical penetrance. Clinically, patients with EPP present with a range of symptoms, from asymptomatic to suffering from an extremely painful photosensitivity. In less than five percent of cases, accumulation of protoporphyrin in the liver results in cholestasis (blockage of bile flow from the liver to the small intestine) and terminal liver failure.

In cases of lead poisoning, lead inhibits ferrochelatase activity, in part resulting in porphyria. In the presence of lead or when there is a deficiency of iron Zinc protoporphyrin is produced instead if heme.

== Interactions ==
Ferrochelatase interacts with numerous other enzymes involved in heme biosynthesis, catabolism, and transport, including protoporphyrinogen oxidase, 5-aminolevulinate synthase, ABCB10, ABCB7, succinyl-CoA synthetase, and mitoferrin-1. Multiple studies have suggested the existence of an oligomeric complex that enables substrate channeling and coordination of overall iron and porphyrin metabolism throughout the cell. N-methylmesoporphyrin (N-MeMP) is a competitive inhibitor with protoporphyrin IX and is thought to be a transition state analog. As such, N-MeMP has been used extensively as a stabilizing ligand for x-ray crystallography structure determination. Frataxin acts as the Fe^{+2} chaperone and complexes with ferrochelatase on its mitochondrial matrix side. Ferrochelatase can also insert other divalent metal ions into protoporphyrin. Some ions, such as Zn^{+2}, Ni, and Co form other metalloporphyrins while heavier metal ions such as Mn, Pb, Hg, and Cd inhibit product release after metallation.

== See also ==
- Lyases
- Erythropoietic protoporphyria
- Sirohydrochlorin ferrochelatase
- Zinc protoporphyrin
