= Iron deficiency (disambiguation) =

Iron deficiency is a common nutritional deficiency.

Iron deficiency may also refer to:

- Iron-deficiency anemia, decrease of red blood cells caused by a lack of iron
- Iron deficiency (plant disorder), a plant disorder also known as "lime-induced chlorosis"
