= Sirohydrochlorin cobaltochelatase =

Enzyme

sirohydrochlorin cobaltochelatase

Identifiers
- EC no.: 4.99.1.3

Databases
- IntEnz: IntEnz view
- BRENDA: BRENDA entry
- ExPASy: NiceZyme view
- KEGG: KEGG entry
- MetaCyc: metabolic pathway
- PRIAM: profile
- PDB structures: RCSB PDB PDBe PDBsum
- Gene Ontology: AmiGO / QuickGO
Search
- PMC: articles
- PubMed: articles
- NCBI: proteins

The enzyme sirohydrochlorin cobaltochelatase (EC 4.99.1.3) catalyzes the reaction

cobalt-sirohydrochlorin + 2 H^{+} = sirohydrochlorin + Co^{2+}

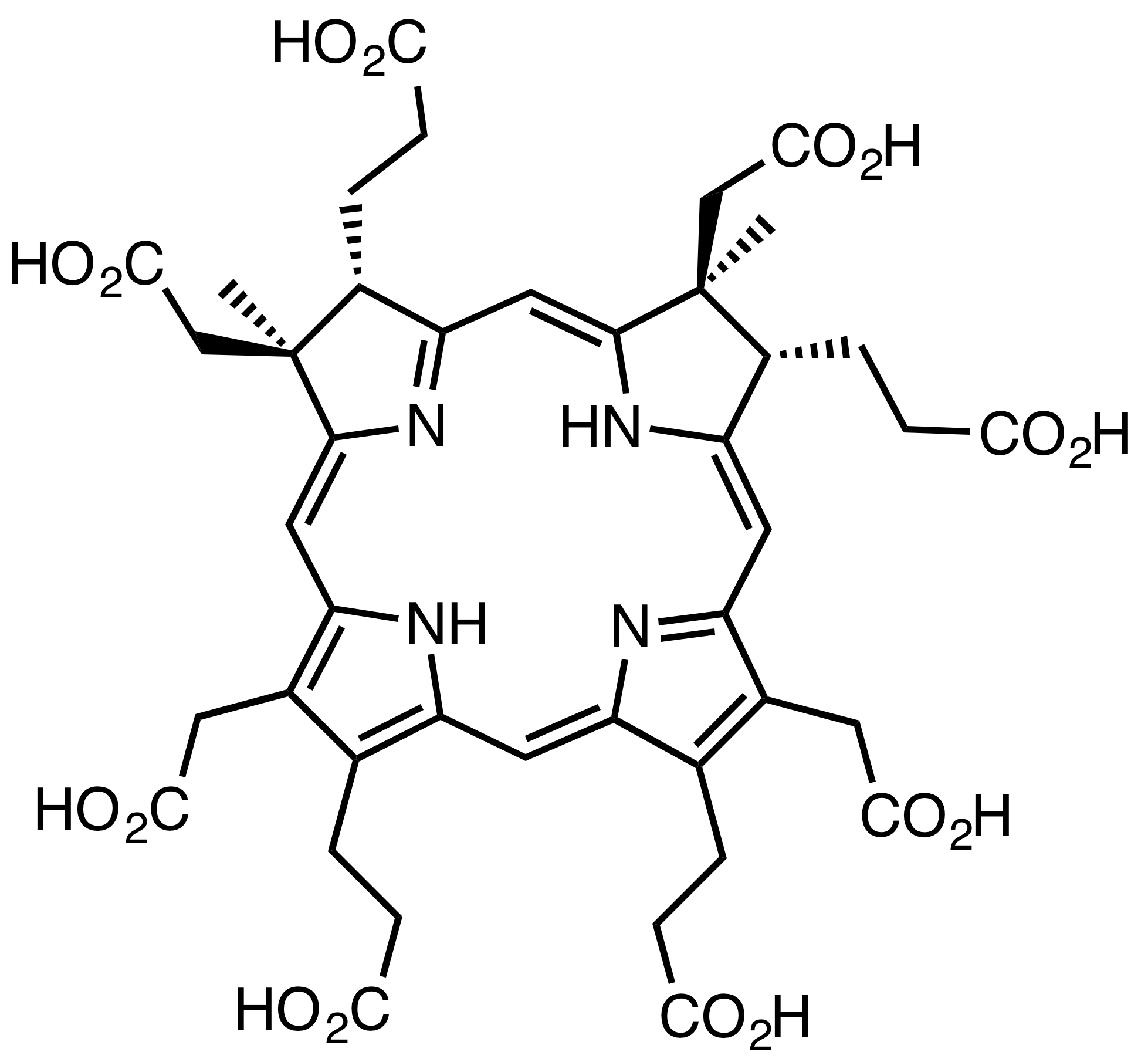
Sirohydrochlorin substrate of the enzme

In the forward direction of reactions towards cobalamin in anaerobic bacteria, the two substrates of this enzyme are sirohydrochlorin and Co^{2+}; its two products are cobalt-sirohydrochlorin and H^{+}.

This enzyme belongs to the family of lyases, specifically the "catch-all" class of lyases that do not fit into any other sub-class. The systematic name of this enzyme class is cobalt-sirohydrochlorin cobalt-lyase (sirohydrochlorin-forming). Other names in common use include CbiK, CbiX, CbiXS, anaerobic cobalt chelatase, cobaltochelatase [ambiguous], and sirohydrochlorin cobalt-lyase (incorrect). This enzyme is part of the biosynthetic pathway to cobalamin (vitamin B_{12}) in bacteria such as Salmonella typhimurium and Bacillus megaterium. It has also been identified as the enzyme which inserts nickel into sirohydrochlorin in the biosynthesis of cofactor F430, reaction EC 4.99.1.11.

== See also ==
- Cobalamin biosynthesis

== Structural studies ==
As of late 2007, two structures have been solved for this class of enzymes, with PDB accession codes 1TJN and 2DJ5.
