= Zinc protoporphyrin =

Names
- IUPAC name Zinc(II) 3-[18-(2-carboxylatoethyl)-8,13-bis(ethenyl)-3,7,12,17-tetramethylporphyrin-21,24-diid-2-yl]propanoic acid monohydrate
- Other names Zinc protoporphyrin IX

Identifiers
CAS Number	15442-64-5
3D model (JSmol)	Interactive image; dianion: Interactive image
Beilstein Reference	4932319, 8184206
ChEBI	CHEBI:28783
ChemSpider	388965
DrugBank	DB03934
ECHA InfoCard	100.035.853
EC Number	239-455-7
Gmelin Reference	403138
KEGG	C03184
MeSH	zinc+protoporphyrin
PubChem CID	dianion: 27287
UNII	LNV3FKZ7GR
CompTox Dashboard (EPA)	DTXSID80274823
- InChI: InChI=1S/C34H34N4O4.Zn/c1-7-21-17(3)25-13-26-19(5)23(9-11-33(39)40)31(37-26)16-32-24(10-12-34(41)42)20(6)28(38-32)15-30-22(8-2)18(4)27(36-30)14-29(21)35-25;/h7-8,13-16H,1-2,9-12H2,3-6H3,(H4,35,36,37,38,39,40,41,42);/q;+2/p-2/b25-13-,26-13-,27-14-,28-15-,29-14-,30-15-,31-16-,32-16-; Key: FUTVBRXUIKZACV-RGGAHWMASA-L; dianion: InChI=1S/C34H34N4O4.Zn/c1-7-21-17(3)25-13-26-19(5)23(9-11-33(39)40)31(37-26)16-32-24(10-12-34(41)42)20(6)28(38-32)15-30-22(8-2)18(4)27(36-30)14-29(21)35-25;/h7-8,13-16H,1-2,9-12H2,3-6H3,(H4,35,36,37,38,39,40,41,42);/q;+2/p-4 Key: FUTVBRXUIKZACV-UHFFFAOYSA-J
- SMILES: CC1=C(CCC(O)=O)C2=[N]3C1=Cc1c(C)c(C=C)c4C=C5C(C)=C(C=C)C6=[N]5[Zn]3(n14)n1c(=C6)c(C)c(CCC(O)=O)c1=C2; dianion: CC1=C(C2=CC3=C(C(=C([N-]3)C=C4C(=C(C(=N4)C=C5C(=C(C(=N5)C=C1[N-]2)C)C=C)C)C=C)C)CCC(=O)[O-])CCC(=O)[O-].[Zn+2]

Properties
Chemical formula	C_{34}H_{32}N_{4}O_{4}Zn
Molar mass	626.032 g/mol
- Except where otherwise noted, data are given for materials in their standard state (at 25 °C [77 °F], 100 kPa). verify (what is ?) Infobox references

Zinc protoporphyrin (ZPP) refers to coordination complexes of zinc and protoporphyrin IX. It is a red-purple solid that is soluble in water. The complex and related species are found in red blood cells when heme production is inhibited by lead and/or by lack of iron.

== Clinical utility ==
Measurement of zinc protoporphyrin in red cells has been used for screening for lead poisoning and for iron deficiency.

Zinc protoporphyrin levels can be elevated as the result of a number of conditions, for instance:

- lead poisoning
- iron deficiency
- sickle cell anemia
- sideroblastic anemia
- anemia of chronic disease
- vanadium exposure
- erythropoietic protoporphyria

The fluorescent properties of ZPP in intact red cells allows the ZPP/heme molar ratio to be measured quickly, at low cost, and in a small sample volume.

== History ==
Porphyrin complexes of zinc have been known since the 1930s. In 1974 ZPP was identified as a major non-heme porphyrin formed in red cells as the result of lead poisoning or iron deficiency., It was already known at this time that non-heme protoporphyrin IX levels were elevated in these conditions, but prior investigators had used acidic extraction methods in their assays that converted ZPP to unbound Protoporphyrin IX. The early literature on quantifying zinc-PP levels may be unreliable.

== Early-stage cancer research ==
ZnPP is under in vitro research for its potential effects on cancer cells. ZnPP is a competitive inhibitor of heme oxygenase, which is a cytoprotective enzyme with higher expression in cancerous tissues. In vitro, ZnPP suppression of heme oxygenase reduces cell viability of cancer cells and increases cytotoxicity in cancer cells.

In preliminary human studies conducted in 2014, ZnPP in combination with anticancer drugs increased cytotoxicity of cancer cells. Tumors from several types of cancer showed a susceptibility to ZnPP due to increased expression of heme oxygenase.

ZnPP has been encapsulated in nanoparticles with a specialized coating for drug delivery inside the body. ZnPP did not show any reduced inhibitory potential on heme oxygenase when loaded into nanoparticles.
