= Conjugated protein =

Protein that contains a non-peptide component

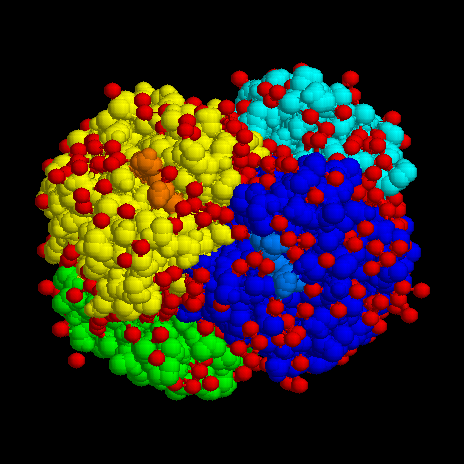
Conjugated protein - hemoglobin: 4 subunits are in different colors

Heme — prosthetic group of hemoglobin

A conjugated protein is a protein that functions in interaction with other (non-polypeptide) chemical groups attached by covalent bonding or weak interactions. These non-Protein components are essential for the proteins biological activity and are not made up of amino acids.

Many proteins contain only amino acids and no other chemical groups, and they are called simple proteins. However, other kind of proteins yield, on hydrolysis, some other chemical component in addition to amino acids and they are called conjugated proteins. The non-amino part of a conjugated protein is usually called its prosthetic group, and it plays a crucial role in determining the protein's structure and function. Most prosthetic groups are formed from vitamins, however, they can vary widely in composition and may include molecules like carbohydrates, lipids, metal ion, or nucleic acids.

Conjugated proteins are classified on the basis of the chemical nature of their prosthetic groups. This classification reflects the differences of their functions, which includes roles in transport, enzymatic activity, structural support, and cellular communication. Conjugated proteins are essential to many biological processes because of their combined protein and non-protein components.

== Structure and bonds ==
Conjugated proteins always have a prosthetic group that is highly associated with the polypeptide chain. Association can occur either through covalent bonding or strong noncovalent interactions like hydrogen bonding, ionic bonding, or coordination bonding. Depending on whether the prosthetic group is a carbohydrate or phosphate, covalent bonds would involve the formation of either glycoside linkage between the carbohydrate and amino acids or ester linkage between the phosphate residue and the protein.

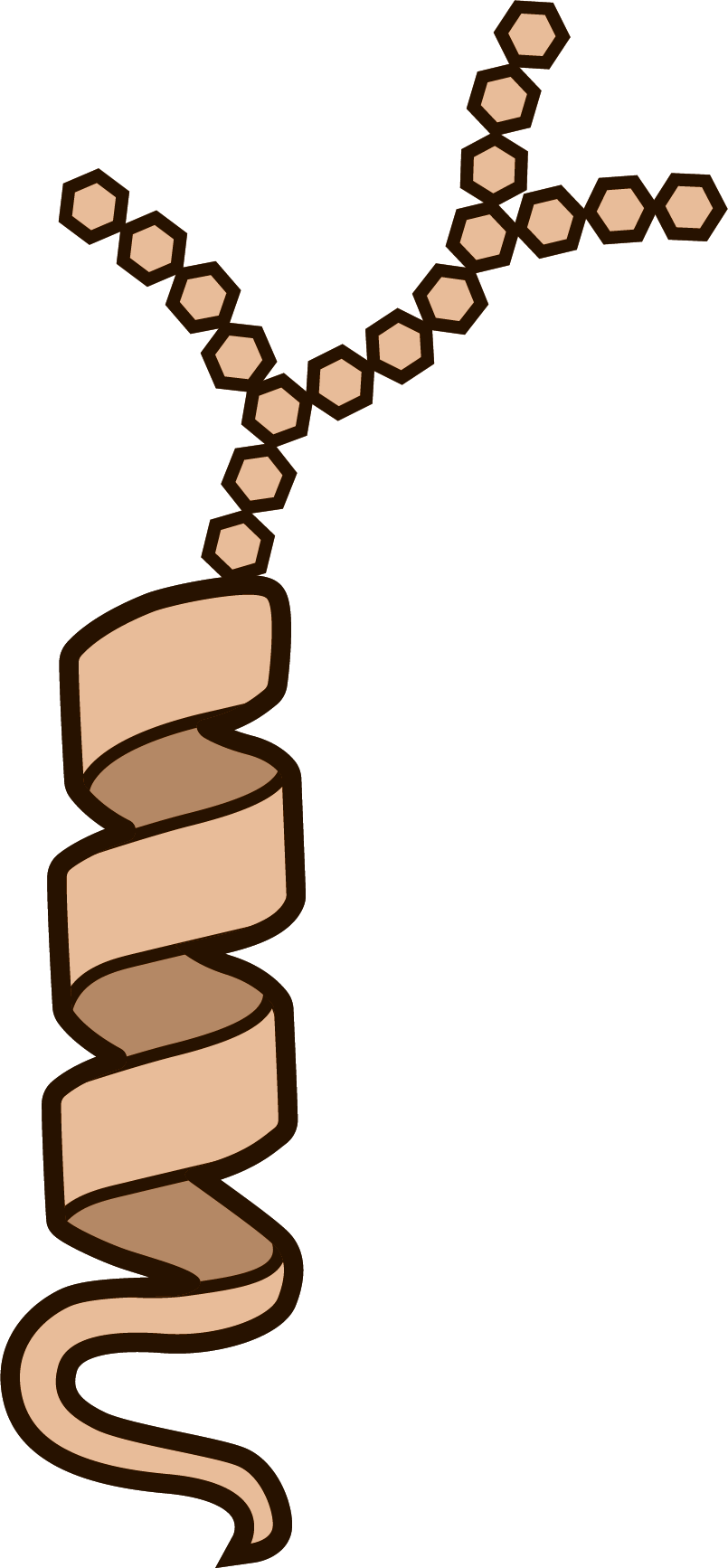
Example of a Glycoprotein structure

Glycoproteins and phosphoproteins are usually associated with covalent bonds since they have a carbohydrate or phosphate residue attached to the side chains of certain amino acid residues like asparagine, serine, and threonine. On the other hand, metalloproteins usually involve coordination bonds where there would be bonds between the metal ions and side chains of some amino acids like histidine, cysteine, or aspartic acid. All of these interactions create stable structures that are important for protein function.

It is common for the prosthetic group to contribute to the function of the protein. An example of this is if the prosthetic group is broken away from the protein, the function of that protein is lost. This is seen in hemoglobin. When the heme group of hemoglobin is removed, the function of the protein is lost, making it a nonfunctional protein. This all highlights the prosthetic groups importance in maintaining both the structure and protein activity of conjugated proteins.

== Biological functions ==
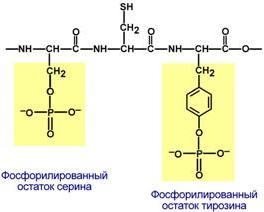
Example of a phosphoprotein structure

Conjugated proteins carry out a wide variety of biological functions that are very important to the survival of living organism, all of which are highly dependent of the chemical structure of the prosthetic group.

Transport is one of the most important roles of conjugated proteins. Hemoproteins are a type of conjugate proteins that help facilitate the transportation of oxygen in blood. Another example of a conjugate protein is lipoproteins. Lipoproteins help facilitate the transportation of lipids like cholesterol and triglycerides. These conjugate proteins help with transportation and are very important in maintaining cellular metabolism and energy levels.

Conjugated proteins are equally important for enzymatic functions as enzymes require prosthetic groups to function. Metalloproteins are an example where metal ions assist in stabilizing intermediates and transferring electrons. Another example includes flavoproteins. Flavoproteins help facilitate oxidation-reduction reactions by utilizing molecules derived from vitamins.

Regulation is another important function of conjugated proteins. Phosphoproteins facilitate reversible phosphorylation reactions which are important in the regulation of cellular functions and protein activity. Phosphorylation allows cells to quickly respond to different environmental factors by switching on and off selected proteins.

Structurally, the conjugated proteins are important in providing stability to cellular components and help intercellular communication which is why glycoproteins are commonly found in cell membranes and extracellular matrices.

== Post-translational modifications ==
Conjugated proteins are synthesized by post-translational modifications where additional chemical groups are attached to the protein structure that has already been formed by a ribosome in a different biological process called translation. Modifications in conjugated proteins occur mainly because of specific enzymes. These modifications can happen in many different areas all around the cell.

One form of a modification is glycosylation. Glycosylation is when carbohydrates are attached to proteins making glycoproteins. Glycosylation mostly happens in the endoplasmic reticulum and Golgi apparatus. Glycosylation aids in the folding of proteins, the stability, and in cell signaling.

Another form of a modification is phosphorylation. Phosphorylation is when a kinase, a type of enzyme, adds a phosphate group to the protein. This process is reversible and the phosphate group can be removed from the protein when a phosphatase, another type of enzyme, is present. Phosphorylation plays an important role in the regulation of the activity of many different protein molecules.

Metalloproteins also go through a modification to attach their metal ions. Similarly, hemoproteins also go through a post-translational modification to have their heme group attached to the protein.

== Clinical significance ==
A change in the structure of a conjugated protein can change the function and result in a number of different diseases. For example, changes in the primary structure of hemoglobin causes sickle cell anaemia and thalassemia, both of which change the way oxygen is transported in the bloodstream. Moreover, lipoproteins' level abnormalities can cause or worsen atherosclerosis as the amounts of cholesterol increase in the artery walls.

Glycoproteins can also be used as markers for certain diseases. Changes in glycosylation are associated with some cancers, inflammation, and autoimmune diseases. Anemia and Wilson's disease can also be caused by mutations in metalloproteins as they are responsible for transporting metal ions.

In medicine, conjugated protein can be used in vaccines. For example, polysaccharide-protein conjugate vaccines can increase the effectiveness of vaccines.

== Examples ==
Some examples of conjugated proteins are lipoproteins, glycoproteins, nucleoproteins, phosphoproteins, hemoproteins, flavoproteins, metalloproteins, phytochromes, cytochromes, opsins, and chromoproteins.

=== Glycoproteins ===
Glycoproteins are conjugated proteins that consist of one or more carbohydrate groups bound to the polypeptide chain. Glycoproteins are generally the biggest groups of conjugated proteins. These carbohydrates are generally shorter polymers of monosaccharide that are covalently bonded. Glycoproteins can be found all around and in living organisms. They range from glycoproteins in cell surface membranes that constitute the glycocalyx, to important antibodies produced by leukocytes.

The main function of glycoproteins is cell recognition and communication. They act as receptors and help cells interact with their environment by responding to different signals. In the immune system, glycoproteins work as antibodies to help the body recognize and destroy foreign organisms like bacteria and viruses. Glycoproteins also have other uses like Adhesion procedure, hormone activity, and protein stability.

=== Lipoproteins ===
Lipoproteins are proteins that are found with lipids. Lipids are insoluble in water and therefore need lipoproteins to facilitate their transportation across the water-based environment of the bloodstream. They have a core of hydrophobic lipids which is covered by proteins and phospholipids. This helps make them soluble in blood plasma.

Lipoproteins play an important role in the transport and metabolism of lipids. They transport lipids like cholesterol, triglycerides, and more to other different parts of the body where they are used for energy production, cell membrane functions, and hormone synthesis. Some examples of this are low-density lipoprotein and high-density lipoprotein. Low-density lipoprotein is often referred to as bad cholesterol because it builds up plaque in arteries. Whereas high-density lipoproteins is usually called good cholesterol because it can help remove the extra cholesterol out of the blood stream.

=== Metalloproteins ===
Metalloproteins are conjugated proteins that are characterized by having one or more metal ions attached to the protein as a prosthetic groups. These metal ions could be iron, zinc, copper, magnesium, etc., and these are very important to the biological functions and its protein activity. Metalloproteins are involved in a wide range processes from electron transfer to catalysis.

Many enzymes are metalloproteins, since metal ions can act as cofactors in chemical reactions. For example, zinc ions can be associated with enzymes that are responsible for gene expression. Moreover, metalloproteins containing iron often are involved in oxygen transport and redox reactions. In this way, the presence of metal ions allows these proteins to perform certain tasks that would not be possible with amino acids alone.

=== Hemoproteins ===
Hemoproteins are metalloproteins that contain a heme group as their prosthetic group. Heme refers to the complex formed by iron ions surrounded by a very big organic ring called a porphyrin. The porphyrin allows the protein to bind gases like oxygen,

One of the most common hemoprotein is hemoglobin, which transports oxygen throughout the human body through the bloodstream. Each hemoglobin molecules has four heme groups, allowing it to carry four oxygen molecules. Myoglobin is another form of hemoprotein. Myoglobin helps to store oxygen in muscle tissues. Hemoproteins are important in energy production since they are helpers in the electron transport chain and cellular respiration.

=== Other types of conjugated proteins ===
Apart from the mentioned types of conjugated proteins, there are several other types of conjugated proteins that are categorized by their prosthetic groups. Nucleoproteins are proteins associated with nucleic acids, which are important in processes such as DNA replication and gene expression. phosphoproteins are another protein that have phosphate groups. Phosphoproteins can help regulate protein activity through phosphorylation.

These additional categories further demonstrate the wide scope of functions performed by conjugated proteins in biological systems. Chemical synthesized polysaccharide–protein conjugates been used for food industry, vaccines, and drug delivery systems. They are promising alternatives to PEG–protein drugs, in which non-biodegradable high molecular weight PEG causes health concerns.
