= Uroporphyrinogen-III C-methyltransferase =

Class of enzymes

Identifiers
- EC no.: 2.1.1.107
- CAS no.: 125752-76-3

Databases
- IntEnz: IntEnz view
- BRENDA: BRENDA entry
- ExPASy: NiceZyme view
- KEGG: KEGG entry
- MetaCyc: metabolic pathway
- PRIAM: profile
- PDB structures: RCSB PDB PDBe PDBsum
Search
- PMC: articles
- PubMed: articles
- NCBI: proteins

Uroporphyrinogen-III C-methyltransferase (EC 2.1.1.107), uroporphyrinogen methyltransferase, uroporphyrinogen-III methyltransferase, adenosylmethionine-uroporphyrinogen III methyltransferase, S-adenosyl-L-methionine-dependent uroporphyrinogen III methylase, uroporphyrinogen-III methylase, SirA, CysG, CobA, uroporphyrin-III C-methyltransferase, S-adenosyl-L-methionine:uroporphyrin-III C-methyltransferase) is an enzyme with systematic name S-adenosyl-L-methionine:uroporphyrinogen-III C-methyltransferase. This enzyme catalyses the following overall chemical reaction

uroporphyrinogen III
+ 2 SAM
dihydrosirohydrochlorin
+ 2 SAH

The enzyme catalyses two methylation reactions. The first reaction converts uroporphyrinogen III into precorrin-1 and the second forms dihydrosirohydrochlorin (precorrin-2). In both cases the methyl group comes from the cofactor, S-adenosyl methionine (SAM), which loses its methyl group and becomes S-adenosyl-L-homocysteine (SAH). These reactions are part of the biosynthetic pathway to cobalamin (vitamin B_{12}) in both anaerobic and aerobic bacteria.

== See also ==
- Cobalamin biosynthesis
