= Siroheme =

Structure of siroheme

Siroheme (or sirohaem) is a heme-like prosthetic group at the active sites of some enzymes to accomplish the six-electron reduction of sulfur and nitrogen. It is a cofactor at the active site of sulfite reductase, which plays a major role in sulfur assimilation pathway, converting sulfite into sulfide, which can be incorporated into the organic compound homocysteine.

== Biosynthesis ==
Like all tetrapyrroles, the macrocyclic ligand in siroheme is derived from uroporphyrinogen III. This porphyrinogen is methylated at two adjacent pyrrole rings to give dihydrosirohydrochlorin, which is subsequently oxidized to give sirohydrochlorin. A ferrochelatase then inserts iron into the macrocycle to give siroheme. Sirohaem synthase can be used to catalyze this reaction.

== See also ==
- Ferredoxin-nitrite reductase
- Hydrogensulfite reductase
- Nitrite reductase (NAD(P)H)
