= Protoporphyrinogen oxidase =

Enzyme

PPOX
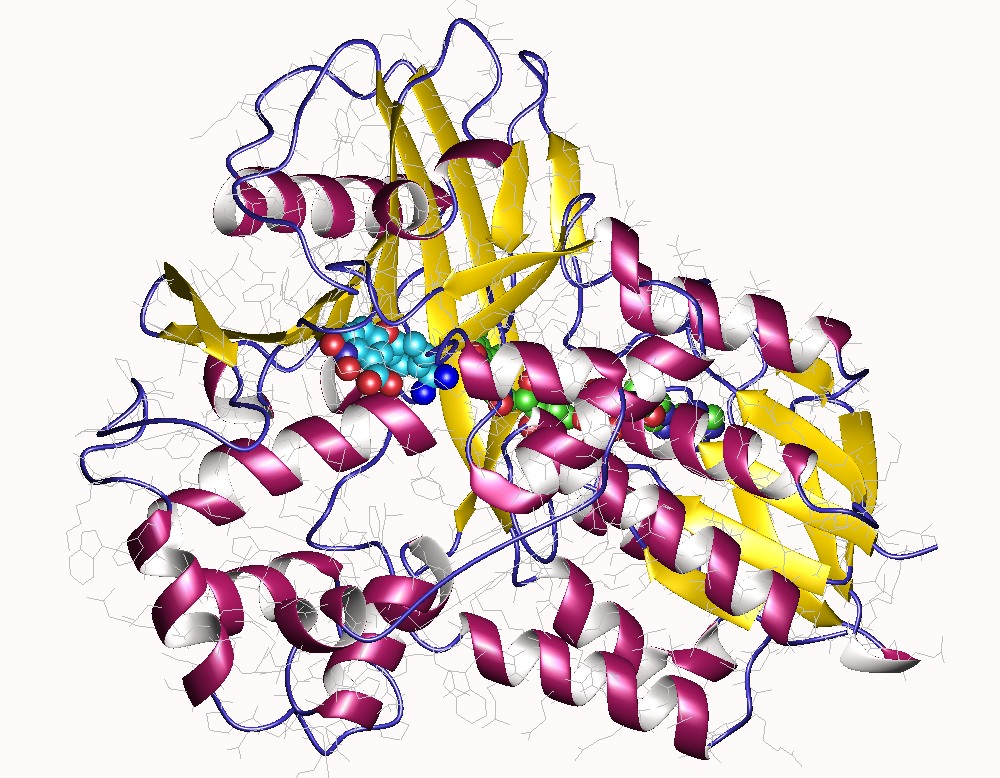

Identifiers
- Aliases: PPOX, PPO, V290M, VP, protoporphyrinogen oxidase
- External IDs: OMIM: 600923; MGI: 104968; GeneCards: PPOX
Available structures
PDB	Ortholog search: PDBe RCSB
PDB	List of PDB id codes 3NKS, 4IVM, 4IVO
Enzyme activity
EC #	BRENDA	ExPASy	KEGG	MetaCyc
1.3.3.4	↗	↗	↗	↗

Gene location (Human)
Chr.	Chromosome 1 (human)
Band	1q23.3	Start	161,166,056 bp
Band	1q23.3	End	161,178,013 bp

Gene location (Mouse)
Chr.	Chromosome 1 (mouse)
Band	1|1 H3	Start	171,103,563 bp
Band	1|1 H3	End	171,108,760 bp
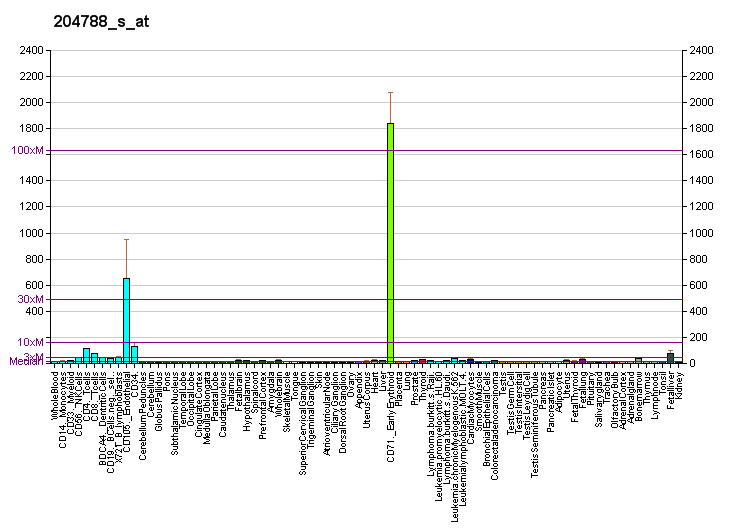
RNA expression pattern
Bgee	Human / Mouse (ortholog); Top expressed in: right uterine tube; olfactory zone of nasal mucosa; epithelium of bronchus; right hemisphere of cerebellum; bronchial epithelial cell; left ovary; anterior pituitary; right ovary; granulocyte; canal of the cervix / Top expressed in: fetal liver hematopoietic progenitor cell; granulocyte; neural layer of retina; tibiofemoral joint; human fetus; right kidney; saccule; yolk sac; genital tubercle; neural tube; More reference expression data
BioGPS	More reference expression data
Gene ontology
Molecular function	flavin adenine dinucleotide binding; oxidoreductase activity; oxygen-dependent protoporphyrinogen oxidase activity
Cellular component	mitochondrial inner membrane; mitochondrial intermembrane space; intrinsic component of mitochondrial inner membrane; membrane; mitochondrion; integral component of mitochondrial inner membrane; mitochondrial membranes
Biological process	heme biosynthetic process; protoporphyrinogen IX metabolic process; protoporphyrinogen IX biosynthetic process; porphyrin-containing compound biosynthetic process
Sources:Amigo / QuickGO
Orthologs
Databases	NCBI: entry; OMA: entry
Species	Human	Mouse
Entrez	5498	19044
Ensembl	ENSG00000143224	ENSMUSG00000062729
UniProt	P50336	P51175
RefSeq (mRNA)	NM_000309; NM_001122764; NM_001350128; NM_001350129; NM_001350130 NM_001350131; NM_001365398; NM_001365399; NM_001365400; NM_001365401	NM_008911
RefSeq (protein)	NP_000300; NP_001116236; NP_001337057; NP_001337058; NP_001337059 NP_001337060	NP_032937
Location (UCSC)	Chr 1: 161.17 – 161.18 Mb	Chr 1: 171.1 – 171.11 Mb
PubMed search
- Wikidata
View/Edit Human	View/Edit Mouse

protoporphyrinogen oxidase
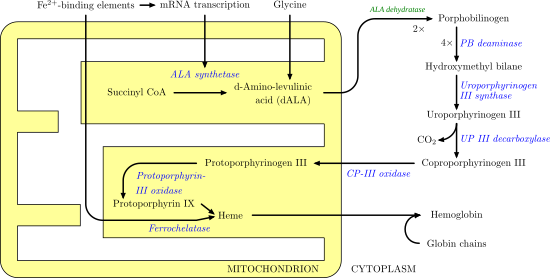
- Heme synthesis—note that some reactions occur in the cytoplasm and some in the mitochondrion (yellow)

Identifiers
- EC no.: 1.3.3.4
- CAS no.: 53986-32-6

Databases
- BRENDA: enzyme data
- ExPASy: NiceZyme view
- KEGG: enzyme entry
- MetaCyc: metabolic pathway
- Rhea: reactions
- PDB structures: RCSB PDB PDBe PDBsum
- Gene Ontology: AmiGO / QuickGO
Search
- PMC: articles
- PubMed: articles
- NCBI: proteins

Protoporphyrinogen oxidase or protox is an enzyme that in humans is encoded by the PPOX gene.

Protoporphyrinogen oxidase is responsible for the seventh step in biosynthesis of protoporphyrin IX. This porphyrin is the precursor to hemoglobin, the oxygen carrier in animals, and chlorophyll, the dye in plants. The enzyme catalyzes the dehydrogenation (removal of hydrogen atoms) of protoporphyrinogen IX (the product of the sixth step in the production of heme) to form protoporphyrin IX. One additional enzyme must modify protoporphyrin IX before it becomes heme. Inhibition of this enzyme is a strategy used in certain herbicides.

== Gene ==
The PPOX gene is located on the long (q) arm of chromosome 1 at position 22, from base pair 157,949,266 to base pair 157,954,082.

== Function ==
This gene encodes the penultimate enzyme of heme biosynthesis, which catalyzes the 6-electron oxidation of protoporphyrinogen IX to form protoporphyrin IX.

protoporphyrinogen IX
3 O_{2}
3 H_{2}O_{2}
3 O_{2}
3 H_{2}O_{2}
protoporphyrin IX

This protein is a flavoprotein associated with the outer surface of the inner mitochondrial membrane.

== Heme biosynthetic pathway ==
The following genes encode enzymes that catalyze the various steps in the heme biosynthetic pathway:

- ALAD: aminolevulinate, delta-, dehydratase
- ALAS1: aminolevulinate, delta-, synthase 1
- ALAS2: aminolevulinate, delta-, synthase 2 (sideroblastic/hypochromic anemia)
- CPOX: coproporphyrinogen oxidase
- FECH: ferrochelatase (protoporphyria)
- HMBS: hydroxymethylbilane synthase
- PPOX: protoporphyrinogen oxidase
- UROD: uroporphyrinogen decarboxylase
- UROS: uroporphyrinogen III synthase (congenital erythropoietic porphyria)

== Clinical significance ==
Variegate porphyria is caused by mutations in the PPOX gene. More than 100 mutations that can cause variegate porphyria have been identified in the PPOX gene. One mutation, a substitution of the amino acid tryptophan for arginine at position 59 (also written as Arg59Trp or R59W), is found in about 95 percent of South African families with variegate porphyria. Mutations in the PPOX gene reduce the activity of the enzyme made by the gene, allowing byproducts of heme production to build up in the body. This buildup, in combination with nongenetic factors (such as certain drugs, alcohol and dieting), causes this type of porphyria.

== Inhibitors as herbicides ==
Inhibition of protoporphyrinogen oxidase is a mechanism of action for several commercial herbicides including the nitrophenyl ethers acifluorfen and fomesafen and the pyrimidinediones butafenacil and saflufenacil. The visible symptoms of treatment are chlorosis and desiccation. The damage is caused by an accumulation of protoporphyrin IX in the plant cells by inhibiting protox within the tetrapyrrole biosynthesis pathway. This is a potent photosensitizer which activates oxygen, leading to lipid peroxidation. Both light and oxygen are required for this process to kill the plant.

== See also ==
- Porphyrin
