= Sulfite reductase =

Enzyme family

sulfite reductase
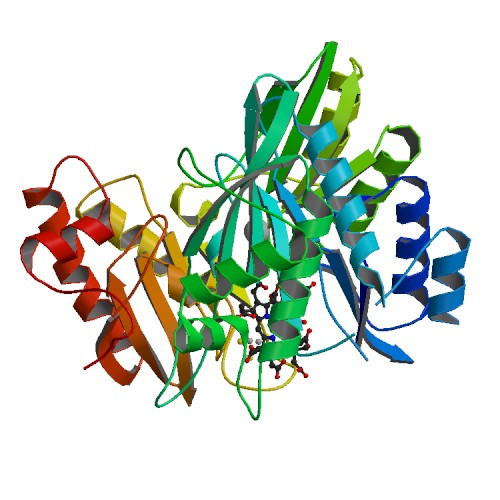
- Crystallographic structure of sulfite reductase from E. coli.

Identifiers
- EC no.: 1.8.99.1
- CAS no.: 37256-51-2

Databases
- IntEnz: IntEnz view
- BRENDA: BRENDA entry
- ExPASy: NiceZyme view
- KEGG: KEGG entry
- MetaCyc: metabolic pathway
- PRIAM: profile
- PDB structures: RCSB PDB PDBe PDBsum
- Gene Ontology: AmiGO / QuickGO
Search
- PMC: articles
- PubMed: articles
- NCBI: proteins

Sulfite reductases (EC 1.8.99.1) are enzymes that participate in sulfur metabolism. They catalyze the reduction of sulfite to hydrogen sulfide and water. Electrons for the reaction are provided by a dissociable molecule of either NADPH, bound flavins, or ferredoxins.

SO_{3}^{2−} (sulfite) + electron donor $\rightleftharpoons$ H_{2}S (hydrogen sulfide) + oxidized donor + 3 H_{2}O

Sulfite reductases, which belong to the oxidoreductase family, are found in the archaea, bacteria, fungi, and plants. They are grouped as either the assimilatory or the dissimilatory sulfite reductases depending on their function, their spectroscopic properties, and their catalytic properties. This enzyme participates in selenoamino acid metabolism and sulfur assimilation. It employs two covalently coupled cofactors - an iron sulfur cluster and a siroheme - which the deliver electrons to the substrate via this coupling.

The systematic name of this enzyme class is hydrogen-sulfide:acceptor oxidoreductase. Other names in common use include assimilatory sulfite reductase, assimilatory-type sulfite reductase, and hydrogen-sulfide:(acceptor) oxidoreductase.
