= Cofactor F430 =

Identifiers
CAS Number	73145-13-8
3D model (JSmol)	Interactive image
ChEBI	CHEBI:28265
ChemSpider	21864910
PubChem CID	5460020
- InChI: InChI=1S/C42H52N6O13.Ni/c1-40(16-30(43)50)22(5-9-33(54)55)27-15-42-41(2,17-31(51)48-42)23(6-10-34(56)57)26(47-42)13-24-20(11-35(58)59)19(4-8-32(52)53)39(45-24)37-28(49)7-3-18-21(12-36(60)61)25(46-38(18)37)14-29(40)44-27;/h13,18-23,25,27H,3-12,14-17H2,1-2H3,(H9,43,45,46,47,48,49,50,51,52,53,54,55,56,57,58,59,60,61);/p-1/t18-,19-,20-,21-,22+,23+,25+,27-,40-,41-,42-;/m0./s1 Key: QFGKGCZCUVIENT-SXMZNAGASA-M
- SMILES: CC12CC(=O)NC13CC4C(C(C(=N4)CC5C(C6CCC(=O)C(=C7C(C(C(=CC(=N3)C2CCC(=O)O)[N-]7)CC(=O)O)CCC(=O)O)C6=N5)CC(=O)O)(C)CC(=O)N)CCC(=O)O.[Ni]

Properties
Chemical formula	C_{42}H_{51}N_{6}NiO^{−}_{13}
Molar mass	906.58014
Appearance	Yellow solid
- Except where otherwise noted, data are given for materials in their standard state (at 25 °C [77 °F], 100 kPa). Infobox references

F_{430} is the cofactor (sometimes called the coenzyme) of the enzyme methyl coenzyme M reductase (MCR). MCR catalyzes the reaction EC 2.8.4.1 that releases methane in the final step of methanogenesis:

CH_{3}−S−CoM + HS−CoB ⇌ CH_{4} + CoB−S−S−CoM

Structure of coenzyme M (HS-CoM)

Structure of coenzyme B (HS-CoB)

It is found only in methanogenic Archaea and anaerobic methanotrophic Archaea. It occurs in relatively high concentrations in archaea that are involved in reverse methanogenesis; these can contain up to 7% by weight of the nickel protein.

== Structure ==
The trivial name cofactor F_{430} was assigned in 1978 based on the properties of a yellow sample extracted from Methanobacterium thermoautotrophicum, which had a spectroscopic maximum at 430 nm. It was identified as the MCR cofactor in 1982 and the complete structure was deduced by X-ray crystallography and NMR spectroscopy. Coenzyme F_{430} features a reduced porphyrin in a macrocyclic ring system called a corphin. In addition, it possesses two additional rings in comparison to the standard tetrapyrrole (rings A-D), having a γ-lactam ring E and a keto-containing carbocyclic ring F. F_{430} and its biosynthetic precursors represent the only known biologically occurring tetrapyrroles containing nickel, an element rarely found in life.

== Biosynthesis ==
uroporphyrinogen III

dihydrosirohydrochlorin

sirohydrochlorin

The biosynthesis builds from uroporphyrinogen III, the progenitor of all natural tetrapyrroles, including chlorophyll, vitamin B_{12}, phycobilins, siroheme, heme, and heme d_{1}. It is converted to sirohydrochlorin via dihydrosirohydrochlorin. Insertion of nickel into this tetrapyrrole is catalysed in reaction EC 4.99.1.11 by the same chelatase, CbiX, which inserts cobalt in the biosynthesis of cobalamin, here giving nickel(II)-sirohydrochlorin.

Nickel(II)-sirohydrochlorin a,c-diamide is converted to seco-F430. It is traditional to depict only one of four Ni-N bonds.

The ATP-dependent Ni-sirohydrochlorin a,c-diamide synthase (CfbE) then converts the a and c acetate side chains to acetamide in reactions EC 6.3.5.12, generating nickel(II)-sirohydrochlorin a,c-diamide. The sequence of the two amidations is random. A two-component complex Ni-sirohydrochlorin a,c-diamide reductive cyclase (CfbCD) carries out a 6-electron and 7-proton reduction of the ring system in a reaction EC 6.3.3.7 generating the 15,17^{3}-seco-F_{430}-17^{3}-acid (seco-F_{430}) intermediate. Reduction involves ATP hydrolysis and electrons are relayed through two 4Fe-4S centres. In the final step, the keto-containing carbocyclic ring F is formed by an ATP-dependent enzyme Coenzyme F(430) synthetase (CfbB) in reaction EC 6.4.1.9, generating coenzyme F_{430}. This enzyme is a MurF-like ligase, as found in peptidoglycan biosynthesis.

== See also ==
- Abelsonite, a similarly nickel-containing geoporphyrin.
