= Aminolevulinic acid =

Endogenous non-proteinogenic amino acid

δ-Aminolevulinic acid

Clinical data
- Trade names: Levulan, NatuALA, Ameluz, others
- Other names: 5-aminolevulinic acid
- AHFS/Drugs.com: Monograph
- MedlinePlus: a607062
- License data: US DailyMed: Aminolevulinic acid
- Routes of administration: Topical, By mouth
- ATC code: L01XD04 (WHO)

Legal status
- Legal status: CA: ℞-only; US: ℞-only; EU: Rx-only; In general: ℞ (Prescription only)

Identifiers
- IUPAC name: 5-Amino-4-oxo-pentanoic acid
- CAS Number: 106-60-5
- PubChem CID: 137
- IUPHAR/BPS: 4784
- DrugBank: DB00855
- ChemSpider: 134
- UNII: 88755TAZ87
- KEGG: D07567
- ChEBI: CHEBI:356416
- ChEMBL: ChEMBL601
- CompTox Dashboard (EPA): DTXSID8048490
- ECHA InfoCard: 100.003.105

Chemical and physical data
- Formula: C_{5}H_{9}NO_{3}
- Molar mass: 131.131 g·mol^{−1}
- 3D model (JSmol): Interactive image
- Melting point: 118 °C (244 °F)
- SMILES: O=C(CN)CCC(=O)O
- InChI: InChI=1S/C5H9NO3/c6-3-4(7)1-2-5(8)9/h1-3,6H2,(H,8,9); Key:ZGXJTSGNIOSYLO-UHFFFAOYSA-N

δ-Aminolevulinic acid (also dALA, δ-ALA, 5ALA, 5-ALA or 5-aminolevulinic acid), an endogenous non-proteinogenic amino acid, is the first compound in the porphyrin synthesis pathway, the pathway that leads to heme in mammals, as well as chlorophyll in plants.

5-ALA is used in photodynamic detection and surgery of cancer.

== Medical uses ==
As a precursor of a photosensitizer, 5-ALA is also used as an add-on agent for photodynamic therapy. In contrast to larger photosensitizer molecules, it is predicted by computer simulations to be able to penetrate tumor cell membranes.

=== Cancer diagnosis ===
Photodynamic detection is the use of photosensitive drugs with a light source of the right wavelength for the detection of cancer, using fluorescence of the drug. 5-ALA, or derivatives thereof, can be used to visualize bladder cancer by fluorescence imaging.

=== Cancer treatment ===
Aminolevulinic acid is being studied for photodynamic therapy (PDT) in a number of types of cancer. It is not currently a first line treatment for Barrett's esophagus. Its use in brain cancer is currently experimental. It has been studied in a number of gynecological cancers.

=== Intra-operative cancer delineation ===
Aminolevulinic acid utilization is promising in the field of cancer delineation, particularly in the context of fluorescence-guided surgery. This compound is utilized to enhance the visualization of malignant tissues during surgical procedures. The US FDA approved aminolevulinic acid hydrochloride (ALA HCL) for this use in 2017.

When administered to patients, 5-ALA is metabolized to protoporphyrin IX (PpIX) preferentially in cancer cells, leading to their fluorescence under specific light wavelengths. This fluorescence aids surgeons in real-time identification and precise removal of cancerous tissue, reducing the likelihood of leaving residual tumor cells behind. This innovative approach has shown success in various cancer types, including brain and spine gliomas, bladder cancer, and oral squamous cell carcinoma.

==== 5-ALA in gliomas ====
Aminolevulinic acid is indicated in adults for visualization of malignant tissue during surgery for malignant glioma (World Health Organization grade III and IV).

Studies since 2006 have shown that the intraoperative use of this guiding method may reduce the tumour residual volume and prolong progression-free survival in people with malignant gliomas.

Cytoreductive surgery has been considered to be benficial for patients with high-grade-gliomas; it has resulted in significantly higher rate of complete resections in malignant gliomas, compared to the traditional white-light resections. The use of 5-ALA has been described as an essential technique, and as standard-of-care at many neurosurgical departments worldwide.

== Side effects ==
Side effects of administration may include liver damage and nerve problems. Hyperthermia may also occur. Deaths have also resulted.

== Biosynthesis ==
In non-photosynthetic eukaryotes such as animals, fungi, and protozoa, as well as the class Alphaproteobacteria of bacteria, it is produced by the enzyme ALA synthase, from succinyl-CoA and glycine. This reaction is known as the Shemin pathway, which occurs in mitochondria.

succinyl-CoA
+
glycine
CO_{2}
aminolevulinic acid
+ coenzyme A

In plants, algae, bacteria (except for the class Alphaproteobacteria) and archaea, it is produced from glutamic acid via glutamyl-tRNA and glutamate-1-semialdehyde. The enzymes involved in this pathway are glutamyl-tRNA synthetase, glutamyl-tRNA reductase, and glutamate-1-semialdehyde 2,1-aminomutase. This pathway is known as the C5 or Beale pathway. Its final step is the reaction:

glutamate-1-semialdehyde
aminolevulinic acid

In most plastid-containing species, glutamyl-tRNA is encoded by a plastid gene, and the transcription, as well as the following steps of C5 pathway, take place in plastids.

== Importance in humans ==
=== Activation of mitochondria ===
In humans, 5ALA is a precursor to heme. Biosynthesized 5ALA goes through a series of transformations in the cytosol, finally being converted to protoporphyrin IX inside the mitochondria. This protoporphyrin molecule chelates with iron in presence of enzyme ferrochelatase to produce heme.

Heme increases the mitochondrial activity thereby helping in activation of respiratory system Krebs cycle and electron transport chain leading to formation of adenosine triphosphate (ATP) for adequate supply of energy to the body.

=== Accumulation of protoporphyrin IX ===
Cancer cells lack or have reduced ferrochelatase activity and this results in accumulation of protoporphyrin IX, a fluorescent substance that can easily be visualized.

=== Induction of heme oxygenase-1 (HO-1) ===
Excess heme is converted in macrophages to biliverdin and ferrous ions by the enzyme HO-1. Biliverdin formed can be further converted to bilirubin and carbon monoxide. Biliverdin and bilirubin are potent antioxidants and regulate important biological processes like inflammation, apoptosis, cell proliferation, fibrosis and angiogenesis.

== Plants ==
In plants, production of 5-ALA is the step on which the speed of synthesis of chlorophyll is regulated. Plants that are fed by external 5-ALA accumulate toxic amounts of chlorophyll precursor, protochlorophyllide, indicating that the synthesis of this intermediate is not suppressed anywhere downwards in the chain of reaction. Protochlorophyllide is a strong photosensitizer in plants. Controlled spraying of 5-ALA at lower doses (up to 150 mg/L) can however help protect plants from stress and encourage growth.
