= Prosthetic group =

Covalently bonded non-protein part of an enzyme

A prosthetic group is a non-amino acid component that is tightly linked to the apoprotein and forms part of the structure of the heteroproteins or conjugated proteins.

It is not to be confused with the cosubstrate that binds to the enzyme apoenzyme (either a holoprotein or heteroprotein) by non-covalent binding a non-protein (non-amino acid).

A prosthetic group is a component of a conjugated protein that is required for the protein's biological activity. It may be organic (such as a vitamin, sugar, RNA, phosphate or lipid) or inorganic (such as a metal ion). Prosthetic groups are bound tightly to proteins and may even be attached through a covalent bond. They often play an important role in enzyme catalysis. A protein without its prosthetic group is called an apoprotein, while a protein combined with its prosthetic group is called a holoprotein. A non-covalently bound prosthetic group cannot generally be removed from the holoprotein without denaturating the protein. Thus, the term "prosthetic group" is a very general one and its main emphasis is on the tight character of its binding to the apoprotein. It defines a structural property, in contrast to the term "coenzyme" that defines a functional property.

Prosthetic groups are a subset of cofactors. Loosely bound metal ions and coenzymes are still cofactors, but are generally not called prosthetic groups. In enzymes, prosthetic groups are typically involved in the catalytic mechanism and are required for enzymatic activity; however, other prosthetic groups have structural properties. This is the case for the sugar and lipid moieties found in glycoproteins and lipoproteins or RNA in ribosomes. They can be very large, representing the major part of the protein in proteoglycans for instance.

The heme group in hemoglobin is a well-known example of a prosthetic group. Further examples of organic prosthetic groups are vitamin derivatives: thiamine pyrophosphate, pyridoxal-phosphate and biotin. Since prosthetic groups are often vitamins or made from vitamins, this is one of the reasons why vitamins are required in the human diet. Inorganic prosthetic groups are usually transition metal ions such as iron (in heme groups, for example in cytochrome c oxidase and hemoglobin), zinc (for example in carbonic anhydrase), copper (for example in complex IV of the respiratory chain) and molybdenum (for example in nitrate reductase).

== List of prosthetic groups ==
The table below contains a list of some of the most common prosthetic groups.

Prosthetic group	Function	Distribution
Flavin mononucleotide	Redox reactions	Bacteria, archaea and eukaryotes
Flavin adenine dinucleotide	Redox reactions	Bacteria, archaea and eukaryotes
Pyrroloquinoline quinone	Redox reactions	Bacteria
Pyridoxal phosphate	Transamination, decarboxylation and deamination	Bacteria, archaea and eukaryotes
Biotin	Carboxylation	Bacteria, archaea and eukaryotes
Methylcobalamin	Methylation and isomerisation	Bacteria, archaea and eukaryotes
Thiamine pyrophosphate	Transfer of 2-carbon groups, α cleavage	Bacteria, archaea and eukaryotes
Heme	Oxygen binding and redox reactions	Bacteria, archaea and eukaryotes
Molybdopterin	Oxygenation reactions	Bacteria, archaea and eukaryotes
Lipoic acid	Redox reactions	Bacteria, archaea and eukaryotes
Cofactor F430	Methanogenesis	Archaea
