= Dr. R. Maag =

Former Swiss chemical company

- Industry: Chemicals
- Founded: 1844
- Founder: Rudolf Maag
- Fate: Became a sales line of Syngenta (Maag Agro), 2000
- Headquarters: Dielsdorf, Switzerland
- Products: Fertilizers; dyes; pest control and plant protection products; wood preservatives

Dr. R. Maag, or Maag, was a Swiss chemical company in Dielsdorf. Rudolf Maag began the business in 1844 with indigo-blue linen cloth and bone-meal fertilizer; it later produced dyes and further fertilizers, and from 1895 plant protection products. It was taken over by Hoffmann-La Roche in 1970 and by Syngenta in 2000, which turned it into a sales line.

== History ==
The Maag family's former blue-dye works (Blaufärberei) in Dielsdorf, 2022

In 1844 Rudolf Maag began producing indigo-blue linen cloth and bone meal fertilizer in Dielsdorf. His son Rudolf, a chemist, joined the business in 1865 and produced chemical dyes, which he exported as far as England. From 1878 he made further fertilizers, and in 1895 a first plant protection product.

In 1919 his son Rudolf, who held a doctorate and was a chemical engineer trained at ETH Zurich, took over the business, which then had seven workers. He hired biologists and specialists in fruit growing and horticulture and developed new pest control and plant protection products, and from 1950 also wood preservatives. In the 1920s he carried out the spraying of fruit trees and the dusting of forests by airplane. Production, research, and exports were expanded, and from 1936 the firm published the Maag-Zeitung. From 1945 it was called Dr. R. Maag.

After Rudolf's death in 1960, his son-in-law Willi Günthart-Maag and Ernst Günthart continued the business. It was taken over by Hoffmann-La Roche in 1970, by Ciba-Geigy in 1990, by Novartis in 1996, and in 2000 by the agribusiness group Syngenta, which turned it into a sales line (Maag Agro).

== Bibliography ==
- 150 Jahre Maag, 1994
