= Protoporphyrin IX =

Chemical compound

Names
- IUPAC name 7,12-Diethenyl-3,8,13,17-tetramethylporphyrin-2,18-dipropanoic acid

Identifiers
CAS Number	553-12-8
3D model (JSmol)	Interactive image
ChEBI	CHEBI:15430
ChEMBL	ChEMBL267548
ChemSpider	10469486
ECHA InfoCard	100.008.213
EC Number	209-033-7
Gmelin Reference	251232
KEGG	C02191
PubChem CID	4971
UNII	C2K325S808
CompTox Dashboard (EPA)	DTXSID4048353
- InChI: InChI=1S/C34H34N4O4/c1-7-21-17(3)25-13-26-19(5)23(9-11-33(39)40)31(37-26)16-32-24(10-12-34(41)42)20(6)28(38-32)15-30-22(8-2)18(4)27(36-30)14-29(21)35-25/h7-8,13-16,35,38H,1-2,9-12H2,3-6H3,(H,39,40)(H,41,42)/b25-13-,26-13-,27-14-,28-15-,29-14-,30-15-,31-16-,32-16- Key: KSFOVUSSGSKXFI-UJJXFSCMSA-N
- SMILES: CC\1=C(/C/2=C/C3=N/C(=C\C4=C(C(=C(N4)/C=C\5/C(=C(C(=N5)/C=C1\N2)C=C)C)C=C)C)/C(=C3CCC(=O)O)C)CCC(=O)O

Properties
Chemical formula	C_{34}H_{34}N_{4}O_{4}
Molar mass	562.658 g/mol
Density	1.27 g/cm^{3}

Hazards
- GHS labelling
Pictograms	(GHS07: Exclamation mark)
Signal word	Warning
Hazard statements	H315, H319, H335
Precautionary statements	P261, P264, P264+P265, P271, P280, P302+P352, P304+P340, P305+P351+P338, P319, P321, P332+P317, P337+P317, P362+P364, P403+P233, P405, P501
- Except where otherwise noted, data are given for materials in their standard state (at 25 °C [77 °F], 100 kPa). Infobox references

Protoporphyrin IX is an organic compound, classified as a porphyrin, that plays an important role in living organisms as a precursor to other critical compounds like heme (hemoglobin) and chlorophyll. It is a deeply colored solid that is not soluble in water. The name is often abbreviated as PPIX.

Protoporphyrin IX contains a porphine core, a tetrapyrrole macrocycle with a marked aromatic character. Protoporphyrin IX is essentially planar, except for the N-H bonds that are bent out of the plane of the rings, in opposite (trans) directions.

== Nomenclature ==
The general term protoporphyrin refers to porphine derivatives that have the outer hydrogen atoms in the four pyrrole rings replaced by other functional groups. The prefix proto often means 'first' in science nomenclature (such as carbon protoxide), hence Hans Fischer is thought to have coined the name protoporphyrin as the first class of porphyrins. Fischer described iron-deprived heme becoming the "proto-" porphyrin, particularly in reference to Hugo Kammerer's porphyrin. In modern times, 'proto-' specifies a porphyrin species bearing methyl, vinyl, and carboxyethyl/propionate side groups.

Fischer also generated the Roman numeral naming system which includes 15 protoporphyrin analogs; the naming system is not systematic however. An alternative name for heme is iron protoporphyrin IX (iron PPIX). PPIX contains four methyl groups −CH_{3} (M), two vinyl groups −CH=CH_{2} (V), and two propionic acid groups −CH_{2}−CH_{2}−COOH (P). The suffix "IX" indicates that these chains occur in the circular order MV-MV-MP-PM around the outer cycle at the following respective positions: c2,c3-c7,c8-c12,c13-c17,c18.

The methine bridges of PPIX are named alpha (c5), beta (c10), gamma (c15), and delta (c20). In the context of heme, metabolic biotransformation by heme oxygenase results in the selective opening of the alpha-methine bridge to form biliverdin/bilirubin. In this case, the resulting bilin carries the suffix IXα which indicates the parent molecule was protoporphyrin IX cleaved at the alpha position. Non-enzymatic oxidation may result in the ring opening at other bridge positions. The use of Greek letters in this context originates from the pioneering work of Georg Barkan in 1932.

== Properties ==
- When UV light is shone on the compound, it fluoresces with a bright red color.
- It is the component of eggshells that gives them their characteristic brown color.

== Natural occurrence ==
The compound is encountered in nature in the form of complexes where the two inner hydrogen atoms are replaced by a divalent metal cation. When complexed with an iron(II) (ferrous) cation Fe^{2+}, the molecule is called heme. Hemes are prosthetic groups in some important proteins. These heme-containing proteins include hemoglobin, myoglobin, and cytochrome c. Complexes can also be formed with other metal ions, such as zinc.

== Biosynthesis ==
The compound is synthesized from acyclic precursors via a mono-pyrrole (porphobilinogen) then a tetrapyrrole (a porphyrinogen, specifically uroporphyrinogen III). This precursor is converted to protoporphyrinogen IX, which is oxidized to protoporphyrin IX. The last step is mediated by the enzyme protoporphyrinogen oxidase.

protoporphyrinogen IX
3 O_{2}
3 H_{2}O_{2}
3 O_{2}
3 H_{2}O_{2}
protoporphyrin IX

Protoporphyrin IX is an important precursor to biologically essential prosthetic groups such as heme, cytochrome c, and chlorophylls. As a result, a number of organisms are able to synthesize this tetrapyrrole from basic precursors such as glycine and succinyl-CoA, or glutamic acid. Despite the wide range of organisms that synthesize protoporphyrin IX, the process is largely conserved from bacteria to mammals with a few distinct exceptions in higher plants.

In the biosynthesis of these molecules, a metal cation is inserted into protoporphyrin IX by enzymes called chelatases. For example, ferrochelatase converts it into heme B by insertion of ferrous iron at the centre of the macrocycle.

protoporphyrin IX
Fe^{2+}
2 H^{+}
heme B

In chlorophyll biosynthesis, the enzyme magnesium chelatase converts it into Mg-protoporphyrin IX.

== Metalloprotoporphyrin IX derivatives ==
Protoporphyrin IX reacts with iron salts in air to give the complex FeCl(PPIX). Heme coordinated with chlorine is known as hemin. Many metals other than Fe form heme-like complexes when coordinated to PPIX. Of particular interest are cobalt derivatives because they also function as oxygen carriers. Other metals—nickel, tin, chromium—have been investigated for their therapeutic value.

Palepron is the disodium salt of protoporphyrin IX.

== History ==
Laidlaw may have first isolated PPIX in 1904.

== Clinical use ==
Protoporphyrin IX fluorescence from 5-ALA administration is used in fluorescent-guided surgery of glioblastoma.

== See also ==
- Carbon monoxide-releasing molecules
- Heme oxygenase
- Biosynthesis of chlorophylls
- Biosynthesis of hemes
- Photodynamic therapy
