= Glutamyl-tRNA reductase =

glutamyl-tRNA reductase

Identifiers
- EC no.: 1.2.1.70

Databases
- IntEnz: IntEnz view
- BRENDA: BRENDA entry
- ExPASy: NiceZyme view
- KEGG: KEGG entry
- MetaCyc: metabolic pathway
- PRIAM: profile
- PDB structures: RCSB PDB PDBe PDBsum
- Gene Ontology: AmiGO / QuickGO
Search
- PMC: articles
- PubMed: articles
- NCBI: proteins

A glutamyl-tRNA reductase (EC 1.2.1.70) is an enzyme that catalyzes the chemical reaction

L-glutamate 1-semialdehyde + NADP^{+} + tRNAGlu $\rightleftharpoons$ L-glutamyl-tRNAGlu + NADPH + H^{+}

The 3 substrates of this enzyme are L-glutamate 1-semialdehyde, NADP^{+}, and tRNA(Glu), whereas its 3 products are L-glutamyl-tRNA(Glu), NADPH, and H^{+}.

This enzyme belongs to the family of oxidoreductases, to be specific, those acting on the aldehyde or oxo group of donor with NAD+ or NADP+ as acceptor. The systematic name of this enzyme class is L-glutamate-semialdehyde: NADP+ oxidoreductase (L-glutamyl-tRNAGlu-forming). This enzyme participates in porphyrin and chlorophyll metabolism.
