= Pyrimidinedione =

Class of chemical compounds

Pyrimidine

Pyrimidinediones are a class of chemical compounds characterized by a pyrimidine ring substituted with two carbonyl groups.

Examples include naturally occurring metabolites:

Trivial name	IUPAC name	Structure	Pathway
Uracil	Pyrimidine-2,4(1H,3H)-dione		Pyrimidine biosynthesis
Thymine	5-Methylpyrimidine-2,4(1H,3H)-dione		Pyrimidine biosynthesis
	5,6-Diaminopyrimidine-2,4(1H,3H)-dione		Riboflavin biosynthesis

drugs:

Primidone

- Fluorouracil
- Idoxuridine
- Primidone
- Trifluridine

and pesticides:

- Bromacil
- Saflufenacil
