= Magnesium chelatase =

Enzyme

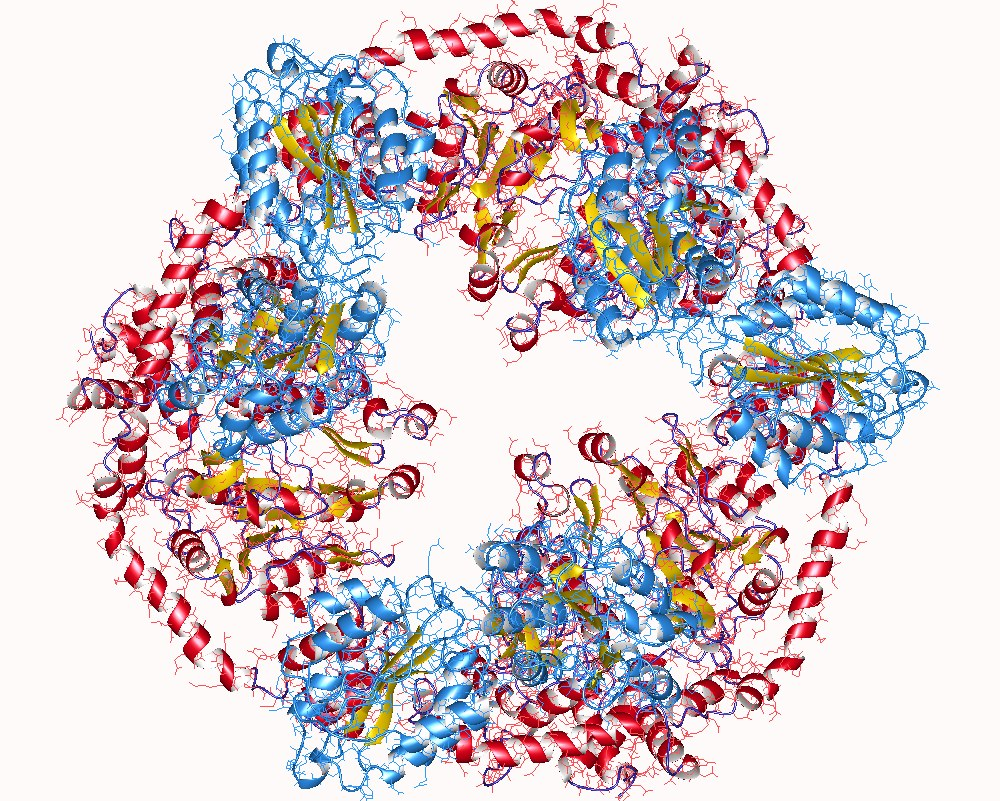
- Magnesium chelatase hetero12mer, Rhodobacter capsulatus

Identifiers
- EC no.: 6.6.1.1
- CAS no.: 9074-88-8

Databases
- IntEnz: IntEnz view
- BRENDA: BRENDA entry
- ExPASy: NiceZyme view
- KEGG: KEGG entry
- MetaCyc: metabolic pathway
- PRIAM: profile
- PDB structures: RCSB PDB PDBe PDBsum
- Gene Ontology: AmiGO / QuickGO
Search
- PMC: articles
- PubMed: articles
- NCBI: proteins

Magnesium chelatase, ChlI subunit

Identifiers
- Symbol: Mg_chelatse_chII
- Pfam: PF01078
- InterPro: IPR000523
Available protein structures:
- PDB: PDB: 1g8p IPR000523 PF01078 (ECOD; PDBsum)
- AlphaFold: IPR000523; PF01078

CobN/magnesium chelatase

Identifiers
- Symbol: CobN/Mg_chltase
- Pfam: PF02514
- InterPro: IPR003672
Available protein structures:
- PDB: IPR003672 PF02514 (ECOD; PDBsum)
- AlphaFold: IPR003672; PF02514

Magnesium-chelatase is a three-component enzyme (EC 6.6.1.1) that catalyses the insertion of Mg^{2+} into protoporphyrin IX. This is the first unique step in the synthesis of chlorophyll and bacteriochlorophyll. As a result, it is thought that Mg-chelatase has an important role in channeling intermediates into the (bacterio)chlorophyll branch in response to conditions suitable for photosynthetic growth:

protoporphyrin IX
+ ATP + H_{2}O
Mg^{2+}
2 H^{+}
magnesium protoporphyrin
+ ADP + P_{i}

The four substrates of this enzyme are protoporphyrin IX, magnesium ion, adenosine triphosphate (ATP), and water. Its products are magnesium protoporphyrin IX, adenosine diphosphate (ADP), phosphate (P_{i}), and two protons.

This enzyme belongs to the family of ligases, specifically those forming nitrogen-D-metal bonds in coordination complexes. The systematic name of this enzyme class is Mg-protoporphyrin IX magnesium-lyase. Other names in common use include protoporphyrin IX magnesium-chelatase, protoporphyrin IX Mg-chelatase, magnesium-protoporphyrin IX chelatase, magnesium-protoporphyrin chelatase, magnesium-chelatase, Mg-chelatase, and Mg-protoporphyrin IX magnesio-lyase. This enzyme is part of the biosynthetic pathway to chlorophylls.

== See also ==
- Biosynthesis of chlorophylls
