= Globin =

Superfamily of oxygen-transporting globular proteins

Globin family (family M)
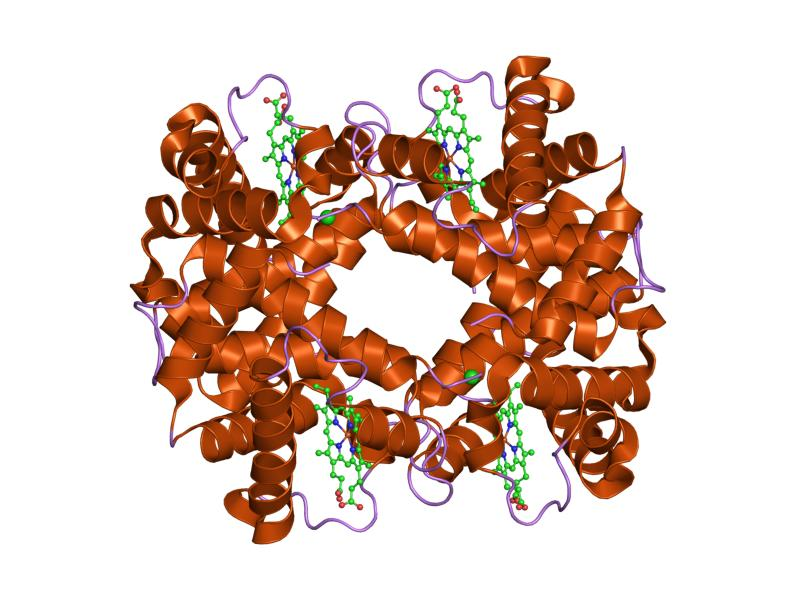
- the Structure of deoxyhemoglobin Rothschild 37 beta Trp----Arg: a mutation that creates an intersubunit chloride-binding site.

Identifiers
- Symbol: Globin
- Pfam: PF00042
- Pfam clan: CL0090
- ECOD: 106.1.1
- InterPro: IPR000971
- PROSITE: PS01033
- SCOP2: 1hba / SCOPe / SUPFAM
- CDD: cd01040
Available protein structures:
- PDB: IPR000971 PF00042 (ECOD; PDBsum)
- AlphaFold: IPR000971; PF00042

Bacterial-like Globin (family T)
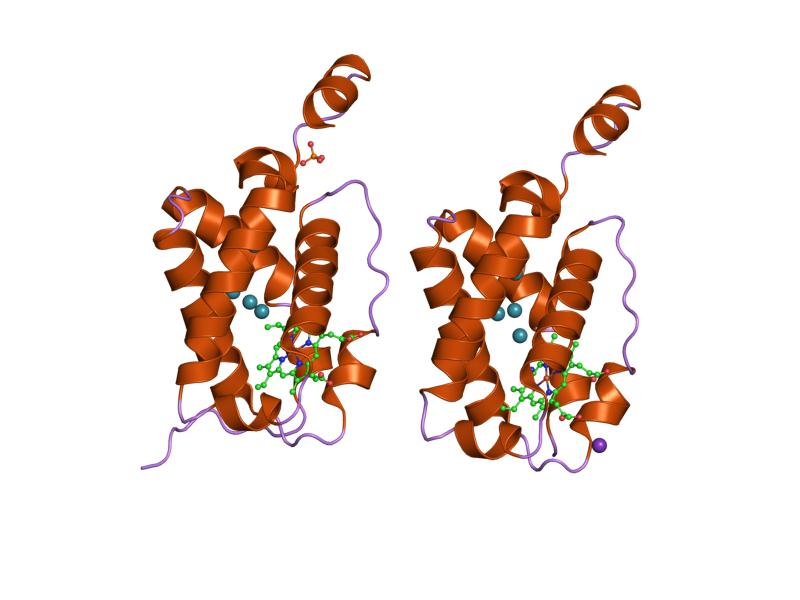
- crystal structure of "truncated" hemoglobin n (hbn) from mycobacterium tuberculosis, soaked with xe atoms

Identifiers
- Symbol: Bac_globin
- Pfam: PF01152
- Pfam clan: CL0090
- InterPro: IPR001486
- PROSITE: PDOC00933
- SCOP2: 1dlw / SCOPe / SUPFAM
- CDD: cd14756
Available protein structures:
- PDB: IPR001486 PF01152 (ECOD; PDBsum)
- AlphaFold: IPR001486; PF01152

Protoglobin (family S)

Identifiers
- Symbol: Protoglobin
- Pfam: PF11563
- Pfam clan: CL0090
- InterPro: IPR012102
- CDD: cd01068
Available protein structures:
- PDB: IPR012102 PF11563 (ECOD; PDBsum)
- AlphaFold: IPR012102; PF11563

The globins are a superfamily of heme-containing globular proteins, involved in binding and/or transporting oxygen. These proteins all incorporate the globin fold, a series of eight alpha helical segments. Two prominent members include myoglobin and hemoglobin. Both of these proteins reversibly bind oxygen via a heme prosthetic group. They are widely distributed in many organisms.

== Structure ==
Globin superfamily members share a common three-dimensional fold. This 'globin fold' typically consists of eight alpha helices, although some proteins have additional helix extensions at their termini. Since the globin fold contains only helices, it is classified as an all-alpha protein fold.

The globin fold is found in its namesake globin families as well as in phycocyanins. The globin fold was thus the first protein fold discovered (myoglobin was the first protein whose structure was solved).

=== Helix packaging ===
The eight helices of the globin fold core share significant nonlocal structure, unlike other structural motifs in which amino acids close to each other in primary sequence are also close in space. The helices pack together at an average angle of about 50 degrees, significantly steeper than other helical packings such as the helix bundle. The exact angle of helix packing depends on the sequence of the protein, because packing is mediated by the sterics and hydrophobic interactions of the amino acid side chains near the helix interfaces.

== Evolution ==
Globins evolved from a common ancestor and can be divided into three lineages:

- Family M (for myoglobin-like) or F (for FHb-like), which has a typical 3/3 fold.
  - Subfamily FHb, for flavohemoglobins. Chimeric.
  - Subfamily SDgb, for single-domain globins (not to be confused with SSDgb).
- Family S (for sensor-like), again with a 3/3 fold.
  - Subfamily GCS, for Globin-coupled sensors. Chimeric.
  - Subfamily PGb, for protoglobins. Single-domain.
  - Subfamily SSDgb, for sensor single-domain globins.
- Family T (for truncated), with a 2/2 fold All subfamilies can be chimeric, single-domain, or tandemly linked.
  - Subfamily TrHb1 (also T1 or N).
  - Subfamily TrHb2 (also T2 or O). Includes 2/2 phytoglobins.
  - Subfamily TrHb3 (also T3 or P).

The M/F family of globins is absent in archaea. Eukaryotes lack GCS, Pgb, and T3 subfamily globins.

Eight globins are known to occur in vertebrates: androglobin (Adgb), cytoglobin (Cygb), globin E (GbE, from bird eye), globin X (GbX, not found in mammals or birds), globin Y (GbY, from some mammals), hemoglobin (Hb), myoglobin (Mb) and neuroglobin (Ngb). All these types evolved from a single globin gene of F/M family found in basal animals. The single gene has also invented an oxygen-carrying "hemoglobin" multiple times in other groups of animals. Several functionally different hemoglobins can coexist in the same species.

=== Sequence conservation ===
Although the fold of the globin superfamily is highly evolutionarily conserved, the sequences that form the fold can have as low as 16% sequence identity. While the sequence specificity of the fold is not stringent, the hydrophobic core of the protein must be maintained and hydrophobic patches on the generally hydrophilic solvent-exposed surface must be avoided in order for the structure to remain stable and soluble. The most famous mutation in the globin fold is a change from glutamate to valine in one chain of the hemoglobin molecule. This mutation creates a "hydrophobic patch" on the protein surface that promotes intermolecular aggregation, the molecular event that gives rise to sickle-cell disease.

== Subfamilies ==
- Leghemoglobin InterPro: IPR001032
- Myoglobin InterPro: IPR002335
- Erythrocruorin InterPro: IPR002336
- Hemoglobin, beta InterPro: IPR002337
- Hemoglobin, alpha InterPro: IPR002338
- Myoglobin, trematode type InterPro: IPR011406
- Globin, nematode InterPro: IPR012085
- Globin, lamprey/hagfish type InterPro: IPR013314
- Globin, annelid-type InterPro: IPR013316
- Hemoglobin, extracellular InterPro: IPR014610

== Examples ==
Human genes encoding globin proteins include:

- CYGB
- HBA1, HBA2, HBB, HBD, HBE1, HBG1, HBG2, HBM, HBQ1, HBZ, MB

The globins include:

- Hemoglobin (Hb)
- Myoglobin (Mb)
- Neuroglobin: a myoglobin-like hemeprotein expressed in vertebrate brain and retina, where it is involved in neuroprotection from damage due to hypoxia or ischemia. Neuroglobin belongs to a branch of the globin family that diverged early in evolution.
- Cytoglobin: an oxygen sensor expressed in multiple tissues. Related to neuroglobin.
- Erythrocruorin: highly cooperative extracellular respiratory proteins found in annelids and arthropods that are assembled from as many as 180 subunit into hexagonal bilayers.
- Leghemoglobin (legHb or symbiotic Hb): occurs in the root nodules of leguminous plants, where it facilitates the diffusion of oxygen to symbiotic bacteroids in order to promote nitrogen fixation.
- Non-symbiotic hemoglobin (NsHb): occurs in non-leguminous plants, and can be over-expressed in stressed plants .
- Flavohemoglobins (FHb): chimeric, with an N-terminal globin domain and a C-terminal ferredoxin reductase-like NAD/FAD-binding domain. FHb provides protection against nitric oxide via its C-terminal domain, which transfers electrons to heme in the globin.
- Globin E: a globin responsible for storing and delivering oxygen to the retina in birds
- Globin-coupled sensors: chimeric, with an N-terminal myoglobin-like domain and a C-terminal domain that resembles the cytoplasmic signalling domain of bacterial chemoreceptors. They bind oxygen, and act to initiate an aerotactic response or regulate gene expression.
- Protoglobin: a single domain globin found in archaea that is related to the N-terminal domain of globin-coupled sensors.
- Truncated 2/2 globin: lack the first helix, giving them a 2-over-2 instead of the canonical 3-over-3 alpha-helical sandwich fold. Can be divided into three main groups (I, II and II) based on structural features.
- HbN (or GlbN): a truncated hemoglobin-like protein that binds oxygen cooperatively with a very high affinity and a slow dissociation rate, which may exclude it from oxygen transport. It appears to be involved in bacterial nitric oxide detoxification and in nitrosative stress.
- Cyanoglobin (or GlbN): a truncated hemoprotein found in cyanobacteria that has high oxygen affinity, and which appears to serve as part of a terminal oxidase, rather than as a respiratory pigment.
- HbO (or GlbO): a truncated hemoglobin-like protein with a lower oxygen affinity than HbN. HbO associates with the bacterial cell membrane, where it significantly increases oxygen uptake over membranes lacking this protein. HbO appears to interact with a terminal oxidase, and could participate in an oxygen/electron-transfer process that facilitates oxygen transfer during aerobic metabolism.
- Glb3: a nuclear-encoded truncated hemoglobin from plants that appears more closely related to HbO than HbN. Glb3 from Arabidopsis thaliana (Mouse-ear cress) exhibits an unusual concentration-independent binding of oxygen and carbon dioxide.

== The globin fold ==
The globin fold (cd01067) also includes some non-hem proteins. Some of them are the phycobiliproteins, the N-terminal domain of two-component regulatory system histidine kinase, RsbR, and RsbN.

== See also ==
- C-rich stability element
- Globular protein
- Hemoglobin
- Heme
- Myoglobin
- Phytoglobin
