= Leghemoglobin reductase =

Class of enzymes

leghemoglobin reductase

Identifiers
- EC no.: 1.6.2.6
- CAS no.: 60440-35-9

Databases
- BRENDA: enzyme data
- ExPASy: NiceZyme view
- KEGG: enzyme entry
- MetaCyc: metabolic pathway
- Rhea: reactions
- PDB structures: RCSB PDB PDBe PDBsum
- Gene Ontology: AmiGO / QuickGO
Search
- PMC: articles
- PubMed: articles
- NCBI: proteins

In enzymology, a leghemoglobin reductase (EC 1.6.2.6) is an enzyme that catalyzes the chemical reaction

NAD(P)H + H^{+} + 2 ferrileghemoglobin $\rightleftharpoons$ NAD(P)+ + 2 ferroleghemoglobin

In other words, a leghemoglobin (or phytoglobin in general) with a Fe^{3+} is reduced to one with the ferrous ion, Fe^{2+}.

This enzyme belongs to the family of oxidoreductases, specifically those acting on NADH or NADPH with a heme protein as acceptor. The systematic name of this enzyme class is NAD(P)H:ferrileghemoglobin oxidoreductase. This enzyme is also called ferric leghemoglobin reductase.

== Role in legume nodules ==
Leghemoglobin (Lb) is a heme-containing protein that reversibly binds and transports O_{2} into the N_{2}-fixing nodules of leguminous plants. In order to function as an O_{2}-carrier Lb must be in the ferrous oxidation state (Lb^{2+}). Oxygenated Lb^{2+} (Lb^{2+}O_{2}) readily autoxidizes to ferric Lb (Lb^{3+}) generating O_{2}^{−} in the presence of trace amounts of transition metals, chelators and toxic metabolites (such as nitrite, superoxide radical and peroxides), however Lb^{2+} is the predominant form in nodules. Therefore, mechanisms exist in vivo for maintaining Lb in the functional ferrous status.

== History ==
Burris and Hass were the first to propose that reduced pyridine nucleotides might function as reductants of Lb^{3+} in leguminous root nodules and in 1969 Appleby reported that Lb^{3+} was reduced to Lb^{2+} by a suspension of bacteroids. In 1982 Kretovich and collaborators purified an enzyme from lupine nodules which catalyzed the reduction of Lb^{3+} to Lb^{2+} using NADH as reductant. This enzyme (named by these authors as Legoglobin Reductase -LR) is similar to NADH:cytochrome b_{5} reductase (EC 1.6.2.2) from erythrocytes and bovine muscle. Lupin LR is a flavoprotein with a molecular mass of 60 kDa and its activity is specific for NADH. In 1984 Klucas and collaborators purified a protein with ferric Lb reductase (FLbR) activity from soybean nodules. The activity of soybean FLbR was 90% in the nodule cytosol and 10% in the bacteroids. NADH was the best reductant for soybean FLbR, although NADPH also functioned at rates that were three-fold less than NADH. These investigations by Klucas and collaborators also showed that the oxidation of NADH and reduction of Lb^{3+} was undetectable when O_{2} was removed from the reaction system, but all were restored upon re-addition of O_{2}, which indicated that the FLbR activity is O_{2}-dependent.

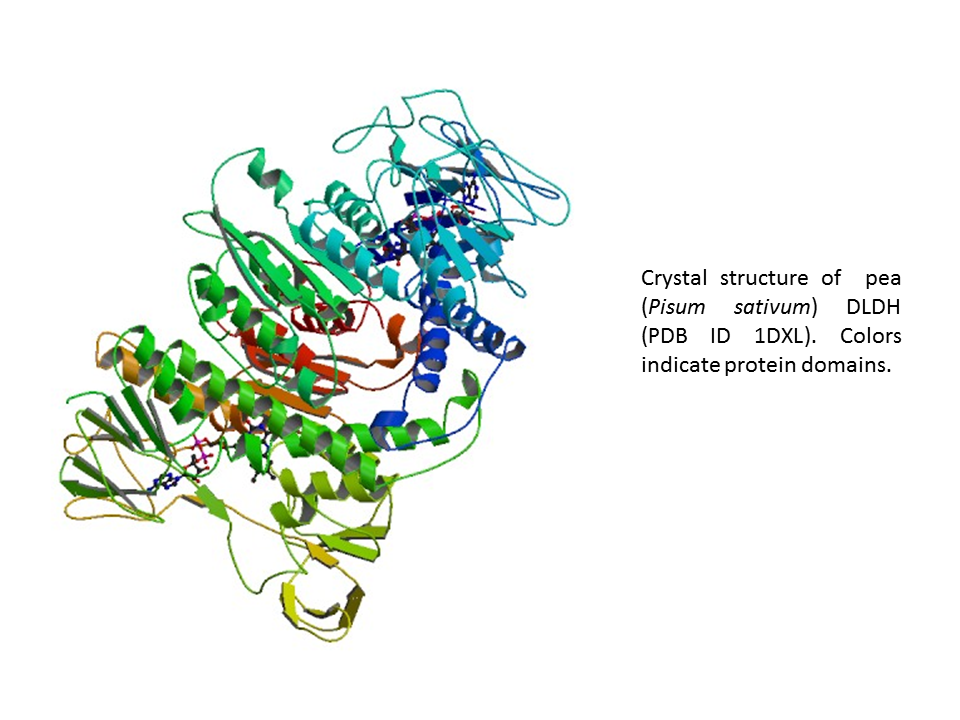

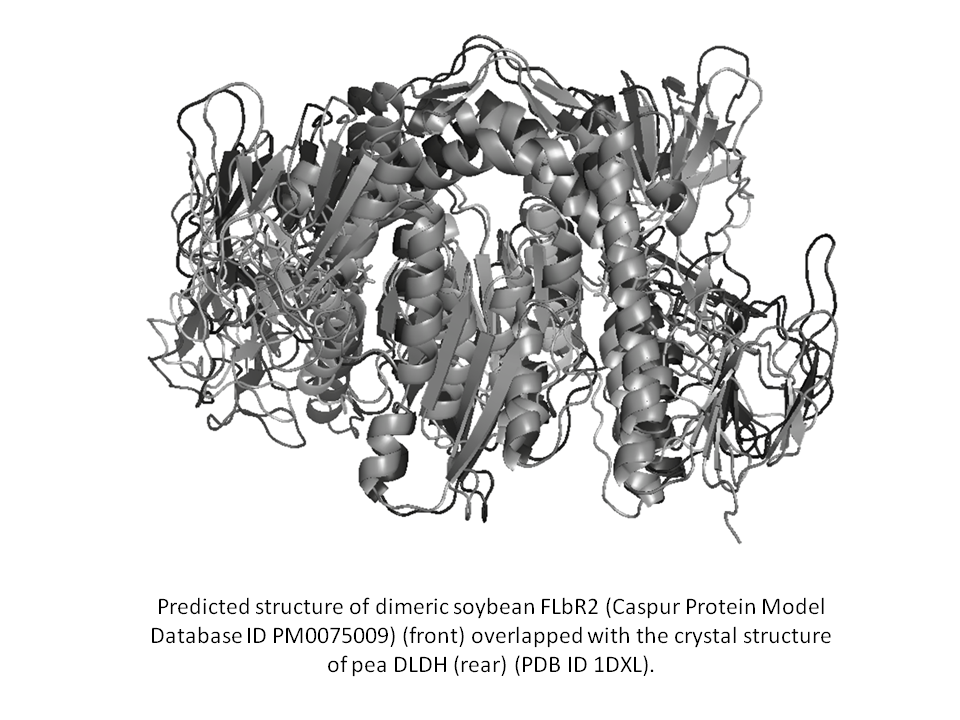

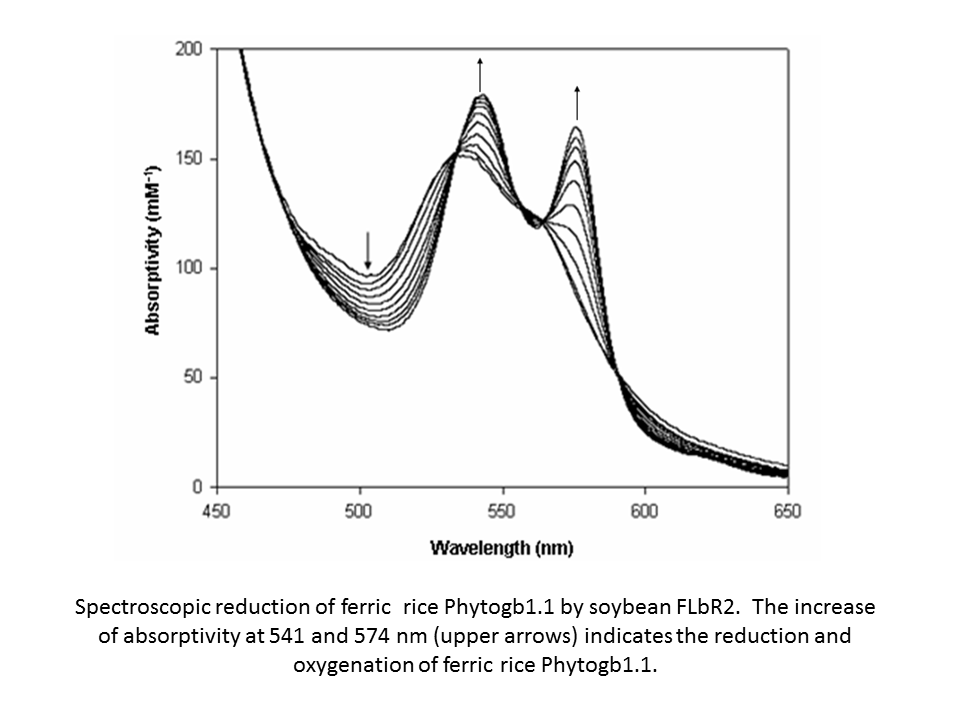

== In legumes ==
Soybean FLbR is a flavoprotein with flavin adenine dinucleotide (FAD) as the prosthetic group and consists of two identical subunits, each having a molecular mass of 54 kDa. The K_{m} and K_{cat} values of soybean FLbR for soybean Lb^{3+} reduction are 9.2 μM and 6.2 s^{−1}, respectively (K_{cat}/K_{m} = 674 M^{−1} s^{−1}). The amino acid sequence of soybean FLbR is highly related to that of the flavin-nucleotide disulfide oxidoreductases, especially dihydrolipoamide dehydrogenase (DLDH) (EC 1.8.1.4) of the pyruvate dehydrogenase complex. The amino acid sequence of soybean FLbR contains a 30-residue signal peptide for translocation into the mitochondria as well as conserved regions for the FAD-binding site, NAD(P)H-binding site and disulfide active site characteristic of pea DLDH and other enzymes in the family of the pyridine nucleotide-disulfide oxidoreductases.

The soybean genome contains at least two copies (named flbr1 and flbr2) of the flbr gene. The amino acid sequence of soybean FLbR2 has considerable homology with soybean FLbR1 and pea leaf mitochondria DLDH and contains a 30-residue mitochondrial transit peptide. FLbR sequences have also been detected and analyzed in legumes other than soybean. For example, the nucleotide sequence of a cowpea FLbR cDNA has 88 and 85% similarity with soybean FLbR and pea DLDH, respectively. The K_{m} and K_{cat} values of cowpea FLbR for cowpea Lb^{3+} reduction are 10.4 μM and 3.1 s^{−1}, respectively (K_{cat}/K_{m} = 298 M^{−1} s^{−1}).

== In other plants ==
Soybean FLbR2 reduces ferric rice Phytoglobin1.1 (Phytogb1.1^{3+}). Apparently, the soybean FLbR2-rice Phytoglobin1.1^{3+} interaction is weak. An in silico analysis predicted that soybean FLbR2 and rice Phytogb1.1^{3+} interact at the FAD-binding domain of soybean FLbR2 and the CD-loop and helix F of rice Phytogb1.1^{3+}. Therefore, FLbRs could be a generalized in vivo mechanism for the enzymatic reduction of Phytogbs^{3+}.

== See also ==
- Cytochrome b5 reductase
