= Neuroglobin =

Mammalian protein found in Homo sapiens

NGB
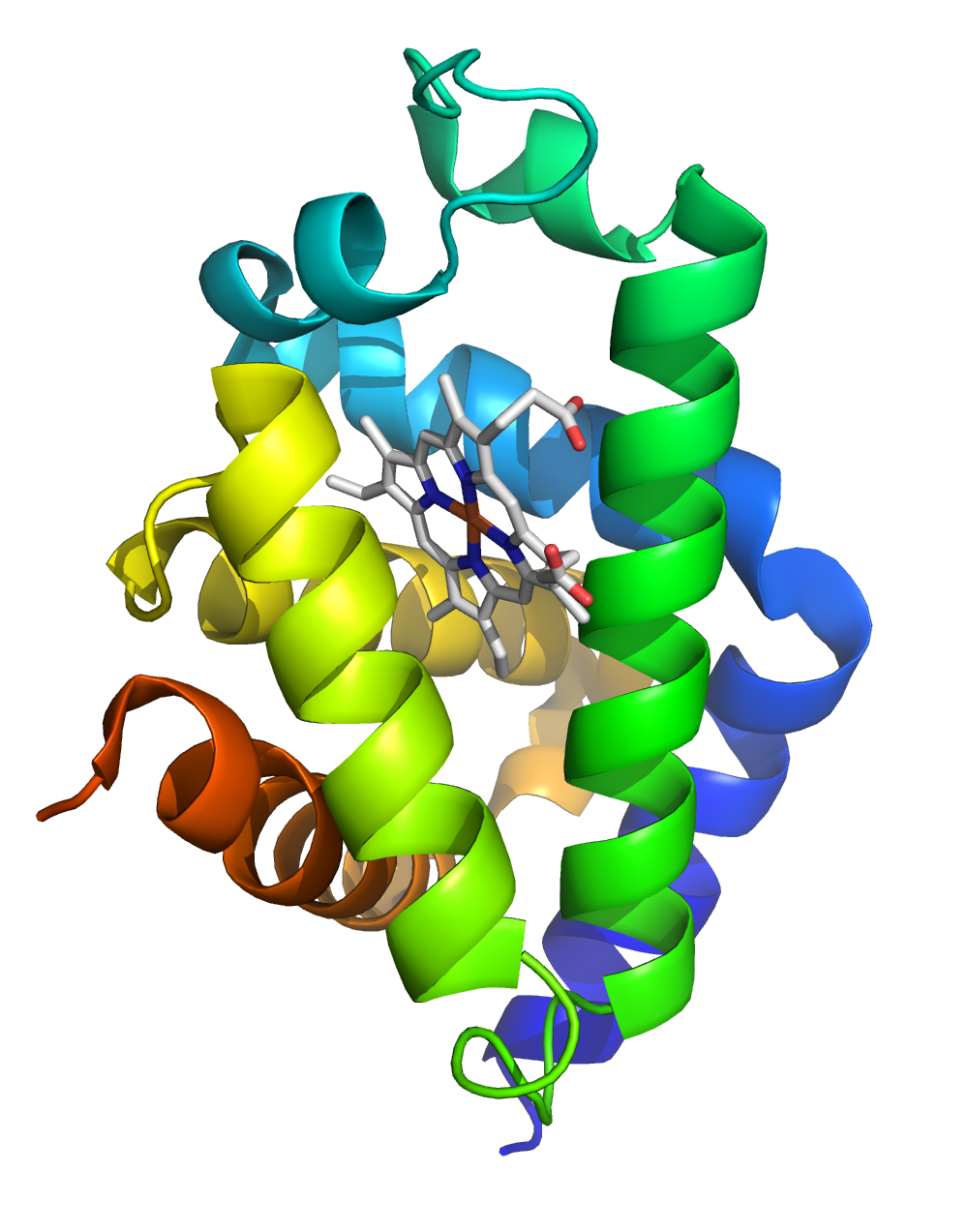
- Based on PDB: 1Q1F

Identifiers
- Aliases: NGB, neuroglobin
- External IDs: OMIM: 605304; MGI: 2151886; GeneCards: NGB
Available structures
PDB	Ortholog search: PDBe RCSB
PDB	List of PDB id codes 1OJ6, 4MPM

Gene location (Human)
Chr.	Chromosome 14 (human)
Band	14q24.3	Start	77,265,483 bp
Band	14q24.3	End	77,271,206 bp

Gene location (Mouse)
Chr.	Chromosome 12 (mouse)
Band	12|12 D2	Start	87,144,305 bp
Band	12|12 D2	End	87,149,313 bp
RNA expression pattern
Bgee	Human / Mouse (ortholog); Top expressed in: right frontal lobe; hypothalamus; dorsolateral prefrontal cortex; endothelial cell; anterior cingulate cortex; testicle; prefrontal cortex; Brodmann area 9; superior frontal gyrus; primary visual cortex / Top expressed in: interventricular septum; arcuate nucleus; ventromedial nucleus; median eminence; dorsomedial hypothalamic nucleus; paraventricular nucleus of hypothalamus; lateral septal nucleus; lateral hypothalamus; anterior amygdaloid area; suprachiasmatic nucleus; More reference expression data
BioGPS	n/a
Gene ontology
Molecular function	protein binding; heme binding; metal ion binding; oxygen carrier activity; oxygen binding
Cellular component	cytoplasm; perikaryon; mitochondrion; cytosol
Biological process	apoptotic process; oxygen transport
Sources:Amigo / QuickGO
Orthologs
Databases	NCBI: entry; OMA: entry
Species	Human	Mouse
Entrez	58157	64242
Ensembl	ENSG00000165553	ENSMUSG00000021032
UniProt	Q9NPG2	Q9ER97
RefSeq (mRNA)	NM_021257	NM_001294308; NM_022414
RefSeq (protein)	NP_067080	NP_001281237; NP_071859
Location (UCSC)	Chr 14: 77.27 – 77.27 Mb	Chr 12: 87.14 – 87.15 Mb
PubMed search
- Wikidata
View/Edit Human	View/Edit Mouse

Neuroglobin is a protein that in humans is encoded by the NGB gene.

Neuroglobin is a member of the vertebrate globin family involved in cellular oxygen homeostasis and reactive oxygen/nitrogen scavenging. It is an intracellular hemoprotein expressed in the central and peripheral nervous system, cerebrospinal fluid, retina and endocrine tissues. Neuroglobin is a monomer that reversibly binds oxygen with an affinity higher than that of hemoglobin. It also increases oxygen availability to brain tissue and provides protection under hypoxic or ischemic conditions, potentially limiting brain damage.

== Species distribution ==
Neuroglobin was in the past found only in vertebrate neurons, but recently in 2013, were found in the neurons of unrelated protostomes, like photosynthetic acoel as well as radiata such as jellyfish.

== Tissue distribution ==
In addition to neurons, neuroglobin is present in astrocytes in certain pathologies of the rodent brain and in the physiological seal brain. This is thought to be due to convergent evolution. It is of ancient evolutionary origin, and is homologous to nerve globins of invertebrates. Recent research confirmed the presence of human neuroglobin protein in cerebrospinal fluid (CSF).

== Structure ==
The 3D structure of human neuroglobin was determined in 2003. The next year, murine neuroglobin was determined at a higher resolution.

== Applications ==
A practical treatment for carbon monoxide poisoning based on binding of CO by neuroglobin (Ngb) with a mutated distal histidine (H64Q) appears to be possible.

== History ==
Neuroglobin was first identified by Thorsten Burmester et al. in 2000.

== See also ==
- Cytoglobin
- Hemoprotein
- Hemoglobin
- Leghemoglobin
- Myoglobin
- Cerebrospinal fluid
