= NGB =

NGB can refer to:

- National Geographic Bee, an annual geography contest in the United States
- National governing body, a sport governing body for a nation
- National Guard Bureau, the federal instrument responsible for the administration of the United States National Guard
- Nederlandse Gidsen Beweging (Dutch Guide Movement), one of the Scouting organisations that evolved into the national Scouting organisation of the Netherlands
- Neuroglobin protein encoded by the gene NGB
- Next-Generation Bomber, a medium bomber formally under development by the United States Air Force
- Ngb, a trigraph in some African orthographies
- Ningbo Lishe International Airport, IATA airport code
- Nordic Gene Bank, the former name of NordGen – Nordic Genetic Resource Center
- Northern Ngbandi language, ISO 639-3 code
- Novagalicia Banco, a Spanish bank
- Von Neumann–Bernays–Gödel set theory, abbreviated NBG or NGB
