= Metmyoglobin =

Metmyoglobin is the oxidized form of the oxygen-carrying hemeprotein myoglobin. Metmyoglobin is the cause of the characteristic brown colouration of meat that occurs as it ages.

In living muscle, the concentration of metmyoglobin is vanishingly small, due to the presence of the enzyme metmyoglobin reductase, which, in the presence of the cofactor NADH and the coenzyme cytochrome b4 converts the Fe^{3+} in the heme prosthetic group of metmyoglobin back to the Fe^{2+} of normal myoglobin. In meat, which is dead muscle, the normal processes of removing metmyoglobin are prevented from effecting this repair, or alternatively the rate of metmyoglobin formation exceeds their capacity, so that there is a net accumulation of metmyoglobin as the meat ages. Metmyoglobin reduction helps limit the oxidation of myoglobin and the oxidation of myoglobin is specific to each species. In other words, metmyoglobin gains electrons in order to limit myoglobin from losing electrons. Metmyoglobin after being oxidized by myoglobin shows the undesirable brown color which can be seen in many types of meat. Metmyoglobin is more susceptible to oxidation when being compared to oxymyoglobin. The metmyoglobin reducing activity varies across species and was studied particularly in beef, porcine, bison, deer, emu, equine, goats and sheep.

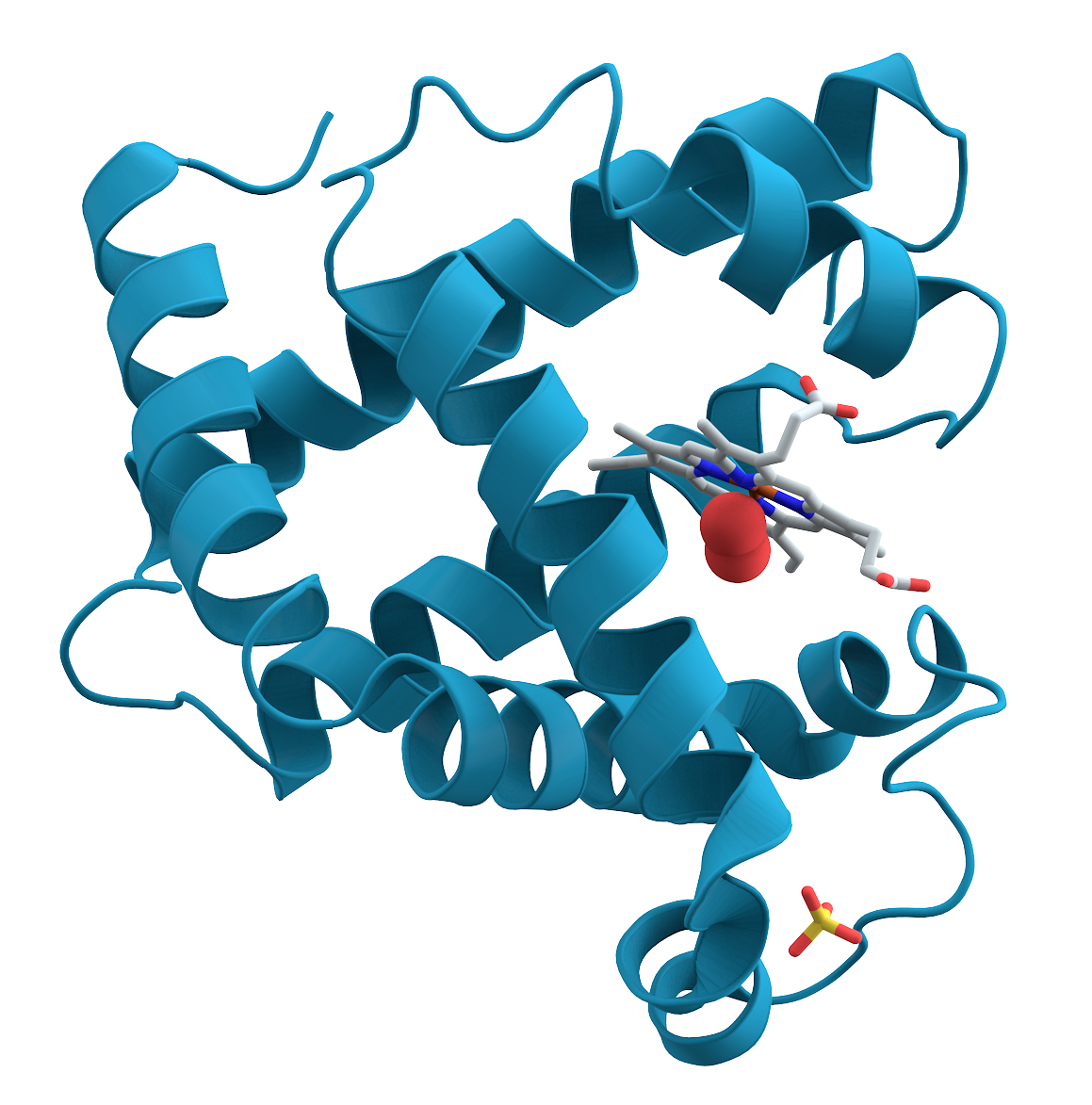

Currently there is not a standard technique in measuring the metmyoglobin in all species. But many techniques are used including reflectance spectrophotometry and absorbance spectrophotometry are used.
