= CYGB =

CYGB may refer to:

- Cytoglobin, the protein product of CYGB, a human and mammalian gene
- Texada/Gillies Bay Airport (IATA: YGB, ICAO: CYGB)
