= NADPH—hemoprotein reductase =

Enzyme

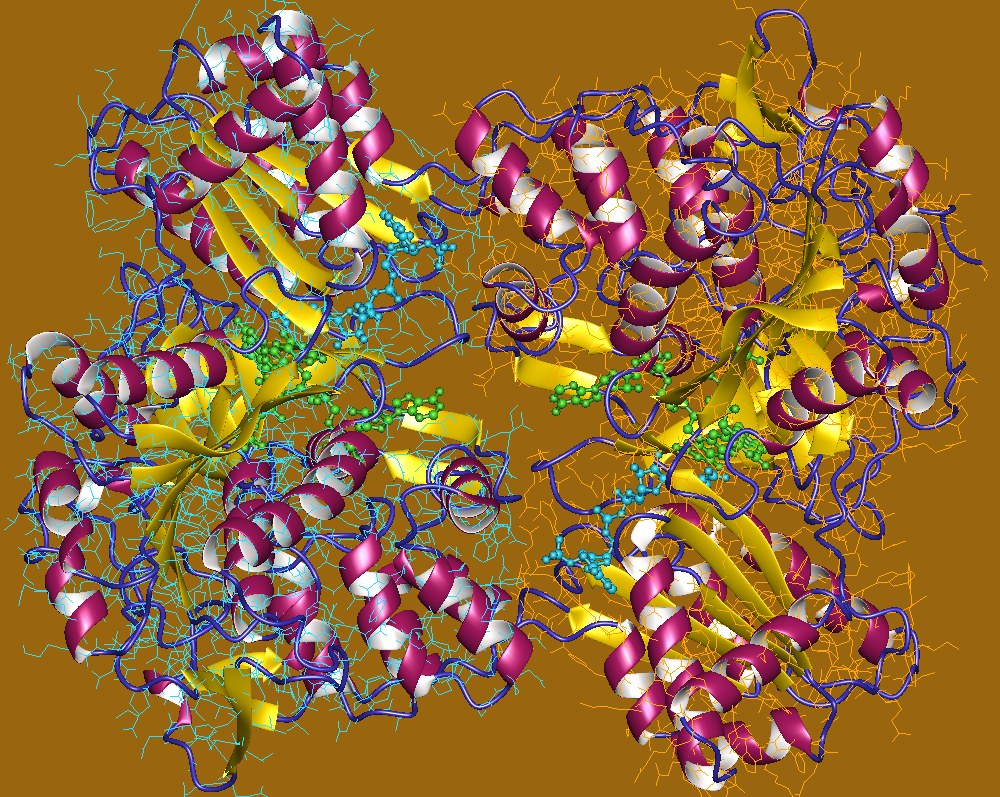
- NADPH-Cytochrome P450 reductase dimer, Rattus norvegicus

Identifiers
- EC no.: 1.6.2.4
- CAS no.: 9023-03-4

Databases
- BRENDA: enzyme data
- ExPASy: NiceZyme view
- KEGG: enzyme entry
- MetaCyc: metabolic pathway
- Rhea: reactions
- PDB structures: RCSB PDB PDBe PDBsum
- Gene Ontology: AmiGO / QuickGO
Search
- PMC: articles
- PubMed: articles
- NCBI: proteins

In enzymology, a NADPH—hemoprotein reductase is an enzyme that catalyzes the chemical reaction

NADPH + H^{+} + n oxidized hemoprotein $\rightleftharpoons$ NADP^{+} + n reduced hemoprotein

The three substrates of this enzyme are NADPH, H^{+}, and oxidized hemoprotein, whereas its two products are NADP^{+} and reduced hemoprotein. It has two cofactors: flavin adenine dinucleotide (FAD) and flavin mononucleotide (FMN).

This enzyme belongs to the family of oxidoreductases, specifically those acting on NADH or NADPH with a heme protein as acceptor. The systematic name of this enzyme class is NADPH:hemoprotein oxidoreductase. Other names include cytochrome P450 reductase, ferrihemoprotein P-450 reductase, and NADPH-dependent cytochrome c reductase.

== Structural studies ==
As of late 2007, 10 structures have been solved for this class of enzymes, with PDB accession codes PDB: 1AMO, PDB: 1B1C, PDB: 1J9Z, PDB: 1JA0, PDB: 1JA1, PDB: 1YQO, PDB: 1YQP, PDB: 2BF4, PDB: 2BN4, and PDB: 2BPO.
