= C-rich stability element =

The C-rich Not M, -ND stability element is a short part of a gene sequence important for the proper synthesis of globin and several other human proteins.

Differences in the stabilities of individual mRNAs can dramatically affect the overall level of expression for genes. Eukaryotic mRNAs can have half-lives that vary several minutes to several days. In differentiating human erythroid cells, the deposition of high levels of alpha globin protein is dependent on an unusually long half-life of the alpha globin mRNA (greater than 24hrs). The stability determinant for alpha globin mRNA has been mapped to a pyrimidine-rich segment of its 3' UTR. This region confers stability by directing the assembly of a specific alpha ribonucleoprotein complex at this site. Subsequently Holcik and Liebhaber identified three other highly stable eukaryotic mRNAs that assemble the alpha globin protein complex at homologous pyrimidine-rich regions within their 3'UTRs (rabbit lipoxygenase, rat tyrosine hydroxylase, and human alpha(I)-collagen).

        ErEN cleavage site V
 -cccaacgggcccu—ccucccc—ucc/u  alpha globin (HBA1 or HBA2, NM_000517.1)
 cccca-----cccu—cuuccccaa       lipoxygenase (ALOX15, NM_001140)
 -ccca----gcccacuuuuccccaa       alpha(I)-collagen (COL1A1, NM_000088)
 cucca---uccccu----ucuccaa       tyroilsmochie hydroxylase (TH, NM_000360)

  ycca 1–5 cccw 1–4 ucycc  : consensus (Holcik and Liebhaber, 1997)

There is some debate as to the number and identity of trans-acting factors recruited to the C-rich element. However the alpha globin poly(C)-binding protein (alphaCP) is agreed to be the core constituent of what is known as the alpha complex. A 39Kda protein, the alphaCP has been shown to bind directly to the C-rich RNA signal. There are two alphaCP, alphaCP1 and alphaCP2. Studies suggest the complex may protect a site near the C-rich element in the alpha globin mRNA from the erythroid endonuclease (ErEN). As many of the protein components necessary for alpha globin stability complex appear to be widely expressed across species and cell types, this mechanism of mRNA stabilisation is likely to be a general one. However, in the mouse, the cis and trans determinants have diverged to some extent. The mouse sequence requirements are equally C- and U-rich, compared to the predominantly C-rich human element. Despite this shift, the murine alpha globin mRNA is still as stable due to a complementary change in the specificity of the poly(C)-binding protein.
