= Phytoglobin-NO cycle =

The phytoglobin-nitric oxide cycle is a metabolic pathway induced in plants under hypoxic conditions which involves nitric oxide (NO) and phytoglobin (Pgb). It provides an alternative type of respiration to mitochondrial electron transport under the conditions of limited oxygen supply. Phytoglobin in hypoxic plants acts as part of a soluble terminal nitric oxide dioxygenase system, yielding nitrate ion from the reaction of oxygenated phytoglobin with NO. Class 1 phytoglobins are induced in plants under hypoxia, bind oxygen very tightly at nanomolar concentrations, and can effectively scavenge NO at oxygen levels far below the saturation of cytochrome c oxidase. In the course of the reaction, phytoglobin is oxidized to metphytoglobin which has to be reduced for continuous operation of the cycle. Nitrate is reduced to nitrite by nitrate reductase, while NO is mainly formed due to anaerobic reduction of nitrite which may take place in mitochondria by complex III and complex IV in the absence of oxygen, in the side reaction of nitrate reductase, or by electron transport proteins on the plasma membrane. The overall reaction sequence of the cycle consumes NADH and can contribute to the maintenance of ATP level in highly hypoxic conditions.
