= Myoglobin =

Iron and oxygen-binding protein

MB
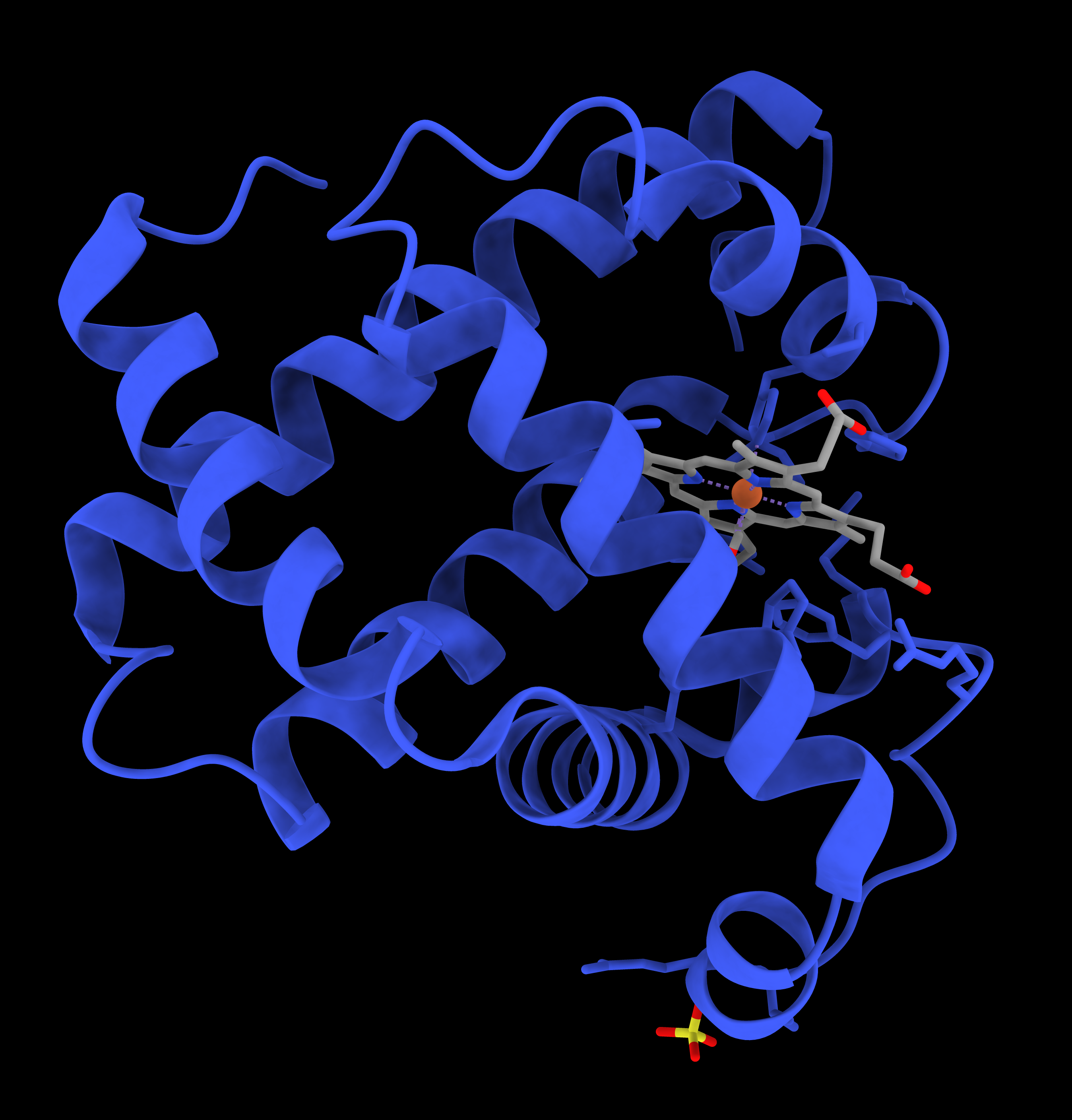

Identifiers
- Aliases: MB, PVALB, myoglobgin, myoglobin, Myoglobin
- External IDs: OMIM: 160000; MGI: 96922; GeneCards: MB
Available structures
PDB	Ortholog search: PDBe RCSB
PDB	List of PDB id codes 3RGK

Gene location (Human)
Chr.	Chromosome 22 (human)
Band	22q12.3	Start	35,606,764 bp
Band	22q12.3	End	35,637,951 bp

Gene location (Mouse)
Chr.	Chromosome 15 (mouse)
Band	15 D3|15 36.36 cM	Start	76,899,687 bp
Band	15 D3|15 36.36 cM	End	76,934,870 bp
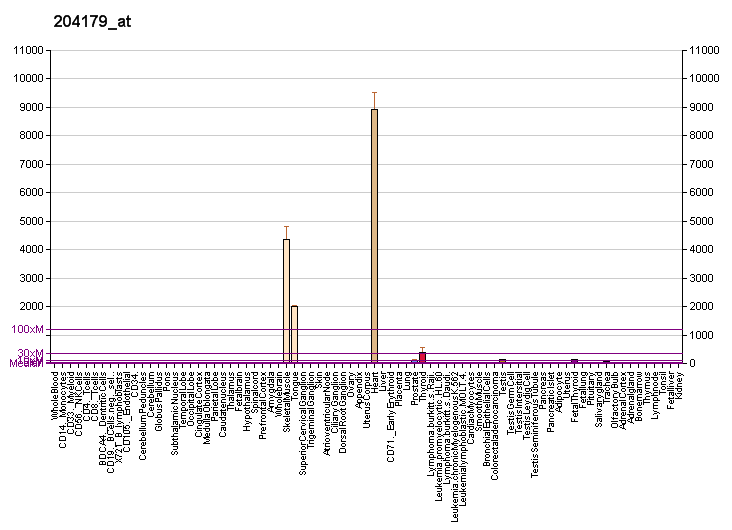
RNA expression pattern
Bgee	Human / Mouse (ortholog); Top expressed in: right ventricle; gastrocnemius muscle; triceps brachii muscle; right auricle of heart; apex of heart; glutes; body of tongue; muscle of thigh; biceps brachii; Skeletal muscle tissue of biceps brachii / Top expressed in: digastric muscle; soleus muscle; right ventricle; intercostal muscle; temporal muscle; ankle; myocardium of ventricle; sternocleidomastoid muscle; interventricular septum; cardiac muscles; More reference expression data
BioGPS	More reference expression data
Gene ontology
Molecular function	oxygen binding; heme binding; metal ion binding; oxygen carrier activity
Cellular component	extracellular exosome; cytosol
Biological process	response to hormone; development of the heart; slow-twitch skeletal muscle fiber contraction; response to hypoxia; enucleate erythrocyte differentiation; response to hydrogen peroxide; brown fat cell differentiation; oxygen transport; transport
Sources:Amigo / QuickGO
Orthologs
Databases	NCBI: entry; OMA: entry
Species	Human	Mouse
Entrez	4151	17189
Ensembl	ENSG00000198125	ENSMUSG00000018893
UniProt	P02144	P04247
RefSeq (mRNA)	NM_005368; NM_203377; NM_203378; NM_001362846	NM_001164047; NM_001164048; NM_013593
RefSeq (protein)	NP_005359; NP_976311; NP_976312; NP_001349775; NP_001369738 NP_001369739; NP_001369740; NP_001369741; NP_001369742	NP_001157519; NP_001157520; NP_038621
Location (UCSC)	Chr 22: 35.61 – 35.64 Mb	Chr 15: 76.9 – 76.93 Mb
PubMed search
- Wikidata
View/Edit Human	View/Edit Mouse

Myoglobin (symbol Mb or MB) is an iron- and oxygen-binding protein found in the cardiac and skeletal muscle tissue of vertebrates in general and in almost all mammals. Myoglobin is distantly related to hemoglobin. Compared to hemoglobin, myoglobin has a higher affinity for oxygen and does not have cooperative binding with oxygen like hemoglobin does. Myoglobin consists of non-polar amino acids at the core of the globulin, where the heme group is non-covalently bonded with the surrounding polypeptide of myoglobin. In humans, myoglobin is found in the bloodstream only after muscle injury.

High concentrations of myoglobin in muscle cells allow organisms to hold their breath for a longer period of time. Diving mammals such as whales and seals have muscles with particularly high abundance of myoglobin. Myoglobin is found in Type I muscle, Type II A, and Type II B; although many older texts describe myoglobin as not found in smooth muscle, this has proved erroneous: there is also myoglobin in smooth muscle cells.

Myoglobin was the first protein to have its three-dimensional structure revealed by X-ray crystallography. This achievement was reported in 1958 by John Kendrew and associates. For this discovery, Kendrew shared the 1962 Nobel Prize in Chemistry with Max Perutz. Despite being one of the most studied proteins in biology, its physiological function is not yet conclusively established: mice genetically engineered to lack myoglobin can be viable and fertile, but show many cellular and physiological adaptations to overcome the loss. Through observing these changes in myoglobin-depleted mice, it is hypothesised that myoglobin function relates to increased oxygen transport to muscle, and to oxygen storage; as well, it serves as a scavenger of reactive oxygen species.

In humans, myoglobin is encoded by the MB gene.

Myoglobin can take the forms oxymyoglobin (MbO_{2}), carboxymyoglobin (MbCO), and metmyoglobin (met-Mb), analogously to hemoglobin taking the forms oxyhemoglobin (HbO_{2}), carboxyhemoglobin (HbCO), and methemoglobin (met-Hb).

== Differences from hemoglobin ==
Like hemoglobin, myoglobin is a cytoplasmic protein that binds oxygen on a heme group. It harbors only one globulin group, whereas hemoglobin has four. Although its heme group is identical to those in Hb, Mb has a higher affinity for oxygen than does hemoglobin but fewer total oxygen-storage capacities. Research suggests that myoglobin facilitates oxygen diffusion down a gradient, enhancing oxygen transport in mitochondria.

== Role in cuisine ==
Myoglobin contains hemes, pigments responsible for the color of red meat. The color that meat takes is partly determined by the degree of oxidation of the myoglobin. In fresh meat the iron atom is in the ferrous (+2) oxidation state bound to an oxygen molecule (O_{2}). Meat cooked well done is brown because the iron atom is now in the ferric (+3) oxidation state, having lost an electron. If meat has been exposed to nitrites, it will remain pink, because the iron atom is bound to NO, nitric oxide (true of, e.g., corned beef or cured hams). Grilled meats can also take on a reddish pink "smoke ring" that comes from the heme center binding to carbon monoxide. Raw meat packed in a carbon monoxide atmosphere also shows this same pink "smoke ring" due to the same principles. Notably, the surface of this raw meat also displays the pink color, which is usually associated in consumers' minds with fresh meat. This artificially induced pink color can persist, reportedly up to one year. Hormel and Cargill (meat processing companies in the US) are both reported to use this meat-packing process, and meat treated this way has been in the consumer market since 2003. If fresh meat is left to an environment where the redox potential is high, oxymyoglobin will eventually turn into metmyoglobin (Fe^{+3}) and the meat will turn into dark red naturally.

Meat alternatives have used various ways to recreate the "meaty" taste associated with myoglobin. Impossible Foods uses leghemoglobin, a heme-containing globin from soy root nodule, produced as a recombinant protein in Komagataella ("Pichia pastoris") yeast. Motif FoodWorks produces a recombinant bovine myoglobin using Komagataella yeast, considered GRAS by the FDA. Moolec Science has engineered a soybean that produces porcine myoglobin in its seeds called "Piggy Sooy"; it was approved by the USDA in April 2024.

== Role in disease ==
Myoglobin is released from damaged muscle tissue, which contain very high concentrations of myoglobin. The released myoglobin enters the bloodstream, where high levels may indicate rhabdomyolysis. The myoglobin is filtered by the kidneys, but is toxic to the renal tubular epithelium and so may cause acute kidney injury. It is not the myoglobin itself that is toxic (it is a protoxin), but the ferrihemate portion that is dissociated from myoglobin in acidic environments (e.g., acidic urine, lysosomes).

Myoglobin is a sensitive marker for muscle injury, making it a potential marker for heart attack in patients with chest pain. However, elevated myoglobin has low specificity for acute myocardial infarction (AMI) and thus CK-MB, cardiac troponin, ECG, and clinical signs should be taken into account to make the diagnosis.

== Structure and bonding ==
Myoglobin belongs to the globin superfamily of proteins, and as with other globins, consists of eight alpha helices connected by loops. Human myoglobin contains 154 amino acids.

Myoglobin contains a porphyrin ring with an iron at its center. A proximal histidine group (His-93) is attached directly to iron, and a distal histidine group (His-64) hovers near the opposite face. The distal imidazole is not bonded to the iron, but is available to interact with the substrate O_{2}. This interaction encourages the binding of O_{2}, but not carbon monoxide (CO), which still binds about 240× more strongly than O_{2}.

The binding of O_{2} causes substantial structural change at the Fe center, which shrinks in radius and moves into the center of N4 pocket. O_{2}-binding induces "spin-pairing": the five-coordinate ferrous deoxy form is high spin and the six coordinate oxy form is low spin and diamagnetic.

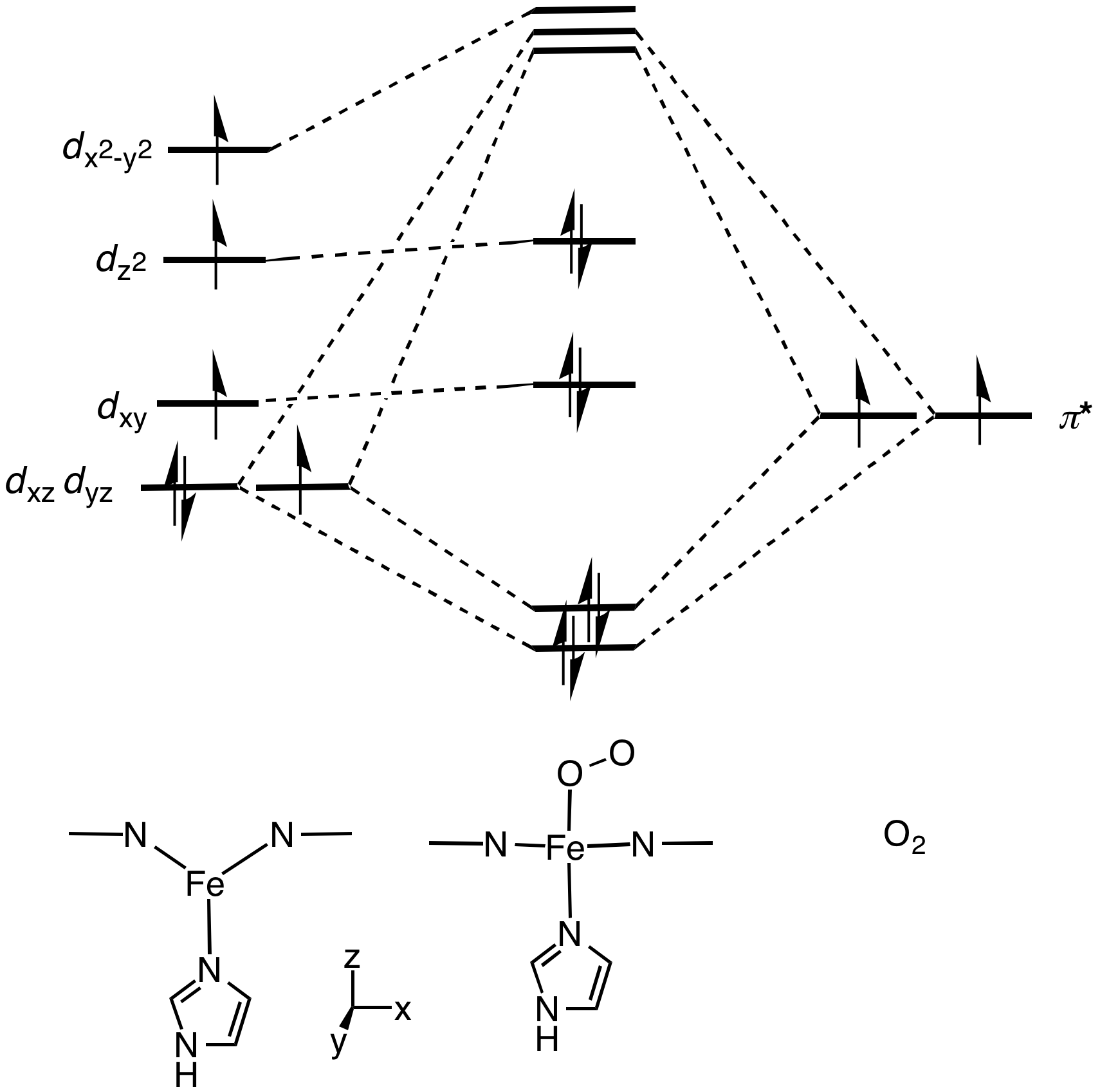
Molecular orbital description of Fe-O_{2} interaction in myoglobin.

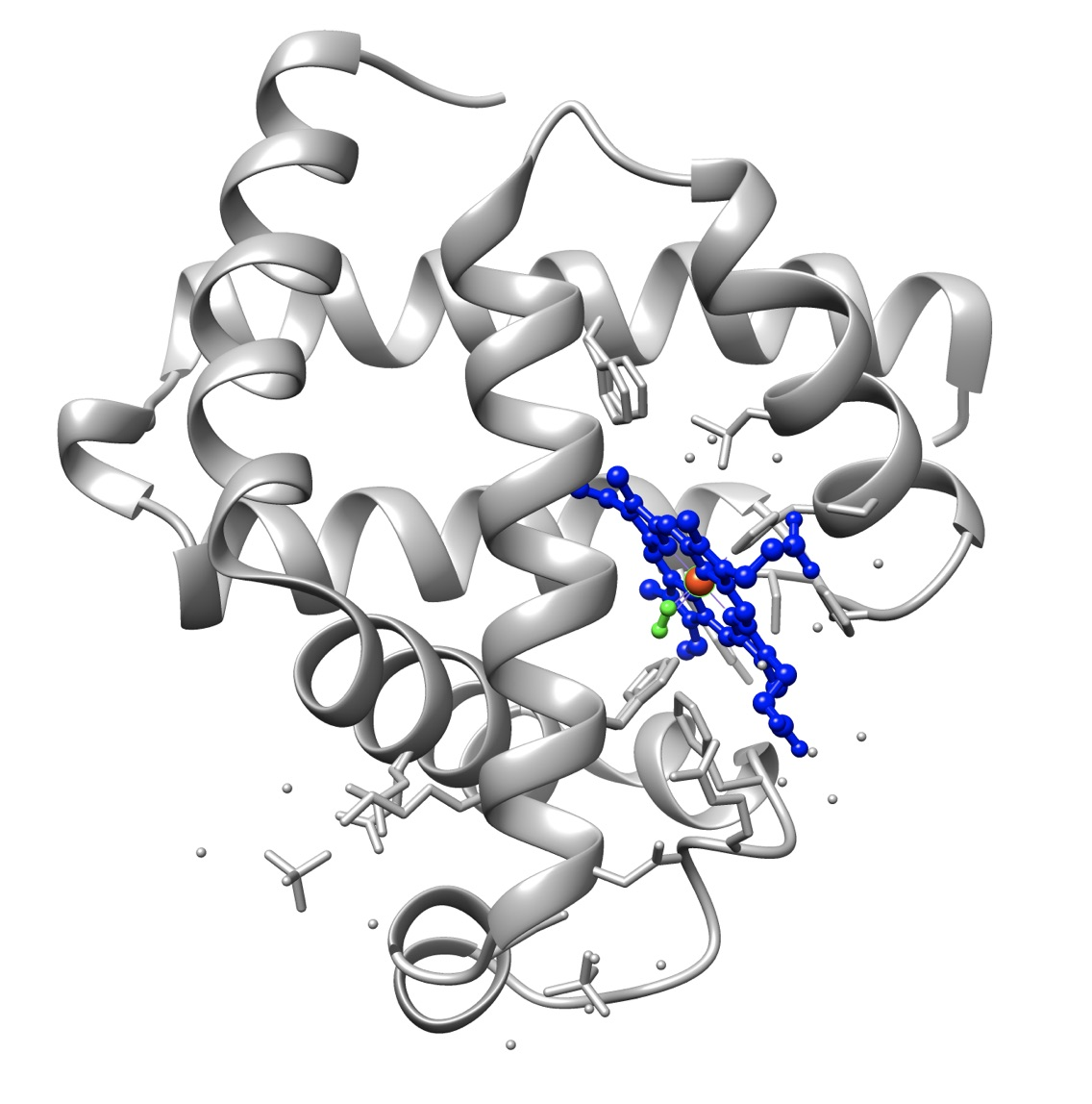
This is an image of an oxygenated myoglobin molecule. The image shows the structural change when oxygen is bound to the iron atom of the heme prosthetic group. The oxygen atoms are colored in green, the iron atom is colored in red, and the heme group is colored in blue.

Myoglobin

== Synthetic analogues ==
Many models of myoglobin have been synthesized as part of a broad interest in transition metal dioxygen complexes. A well known example is the picket fence porphyrin, which consists of a ferrous complex of a sterically bulky derivative of tetraphenylporphyrin. In the presence of an imidazole ligand, this ferrous complex reversibly binds O_{2}. The O_{2} substrate adopts a bent geometry, occupying the sixth position of the iron center. A key property of this model is the slow formation of the μ-oxo dimer, which is an inactive diferric state. In nature, such deactivation pathways are suppressed by protein matrix that prevents close approach of the Fe-porphyrin assemblies.

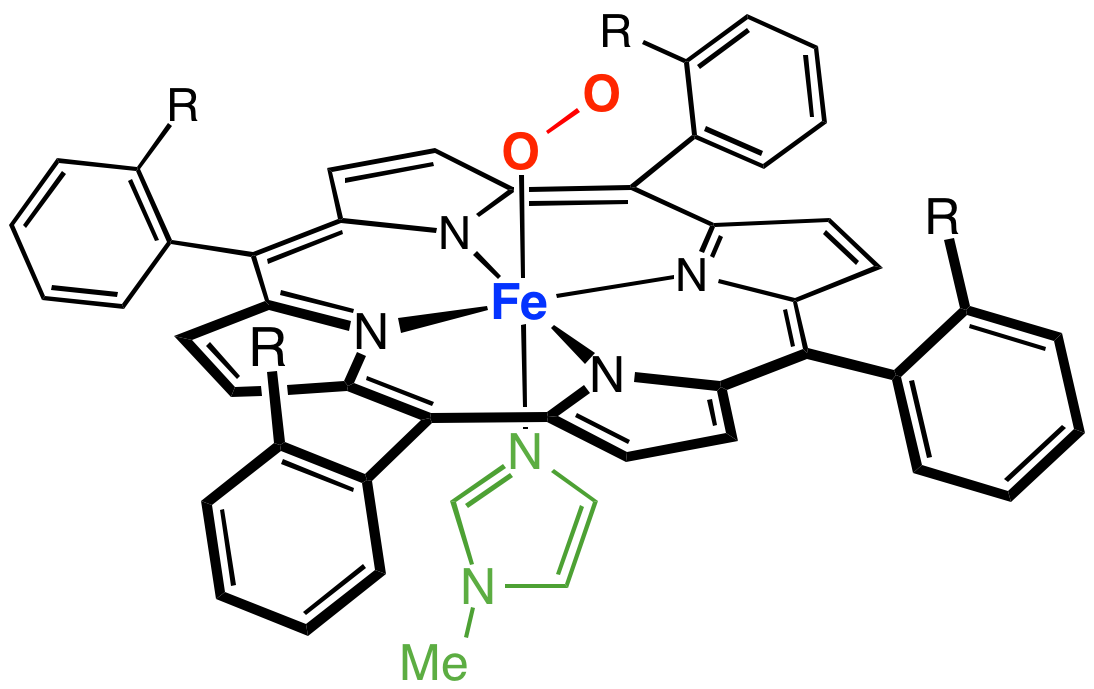
A picket-fence porphyrin complex of Fe, with axial coordination sites occupied by methylimidazole (green) and dioxygen. The R groups flank the O_{2}-binding site.

== See also ==
- Cytoglobin
- Hemoglobin
- Hemoprotein
- Neuroglobin
- Phytoglobin
- Myoglobinuria - The presence of myoglobin in the urine
- Ischemia-reperfusion injury of the appendicular musculoskeletal system
