= Hemoglobin, alpha 2 =

Mammalian protein found in Homo sapiens

HBA2
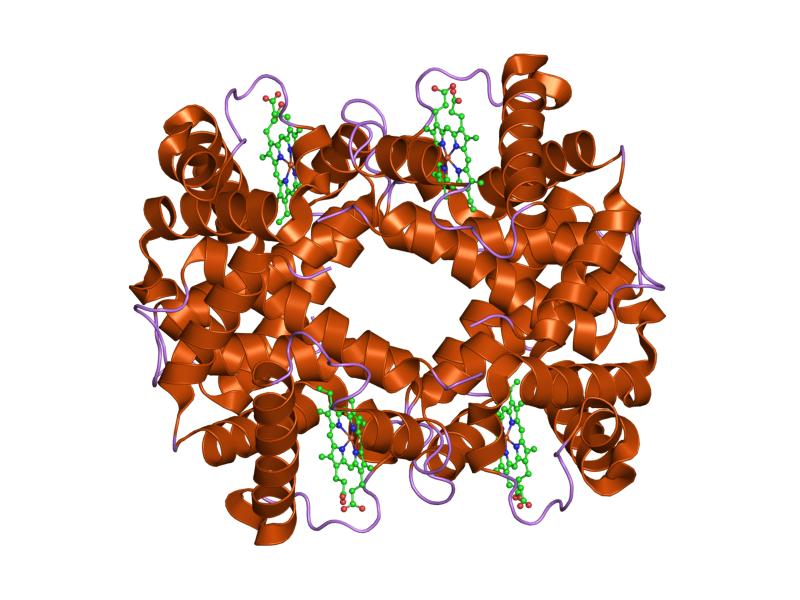

Identifiers
- Aliases: HBA2, HBA-T2, HBH, Hemoglobin, alpha 2, hemoglobin subunit alpha 2, ECYT7
- External IDs: OMIM: 141850; MGI: 96015; GeneCards: HBA2
Available structures
PDB	Ortholog search: PDBe RCSB
PDB	List of PDB id codes 1A00, 1A01, 1A0U, 1A0Z, 1A3N, 1A3O, 1A9W, 1ABW, 1ABY, 1AJ9, 1B86, 1BAB, 1BBB, 1BIJ, 1BUW, 1BZ0, 1BZ1, 1BZZ, 1C7B, 1C7C, 1C7D, 1CLS, 1CMY, 1COH, 1DKE, 1DXT, 1DXU, 1DXV, 1FDH, 1FN3, 1G9V, 1GBU, 1GBV, 1GLI, 1GZX, 1HAB, 1HAC, 1HBA, 1HBB, 1HBS, 1HCO, 1HDB, 1HGA, 1HGB, 1HGC, 1HHO, 1IRD, 1J3Y, 1J3Z, 1J40, 1J41, 1J7S, 1J7W, 1J7Y, 1JY7, 1K0Y, 1K1K, 1KD2, 1LFL, 1LFQ, 1LFT, 1LFV, 1LFY, 1LFZ, 1LJW, 1M9P, 1MKO, 1NEJ, 1NIH, 1NQP, 1O1I, 1O1J, 1O1K, 1O1L, 1O1M, 1O1N, 1O1O, 1O1P, 1QI8, 1QSH, 1QSI, 1QXD, 1QXE, 1R1X, 1R1Y, 1RPS, 1RQ3, 1RQ4, 1RQA, 1RVW, 1SDK, 1SDL, 1SHR, 1SI4, 1THB, 1UIW, 1VWT, 1XXT, 1XY0, 1XYE, 1XZ2, 1XZ4, 1XZ5, 1XZ7, 1XZU, 1XZV, 1Y01, 1Y09, 1Y0A, 1Y0C, 1Y0D, 1Y0T, 1Y0W, 1Y22, 1Y2Z, 1Y31, 1Y35, 1Y45, 1Y46, 1Y4B, 1Y4F, 1Y4G, 1Y4P, 1Y4Q, 1Y4R, 1Y4V, 1Y5F, 1Y5J, 1Y5K, 1Y7C, 1Y7D, 1Y7G, 1Y7Z, 1Y83, 1Y85, 1Y8W, 1YDZ, 1YE0, 1YE1, 1YE2, 1YEN, 1YEO, 1YEQ, 1YEU, 1YEV, 1YFF, 1YG5, 1YGD, 1YGF, 1YH9, 1YHE, 1YHR, 1YIE, 1YIH, 1YVQ, 1YVT, 1YZI, 1Z8U, 2D5Z, 2D60, 2DN1, 2DN2, 2DN3, 2DXM, 2H35, 2HBC, 2HBD, 2HBE, 2HBF, 2HBS, 2HCO, 2HHD, 2HHE, 2M6Z, 2W6V, 2W72, 2YRS, 3B75, 3D17, 3D7O, 3DUT, 3HXN, 3IA3, 3IC0, 3IC2, 3KMF, 3NL7, 3NMM, 3ODQ, 3ONZ, 3OO4, 3OO5, 3OVU, 3P5Q, 3QJB, 3QJC, 3QJD, 3QJE, 3R5I, 3S48, 3S65, 3S66, 3SZK, 3WCP, 3WHM, 4FC3, 4HHB, 4IJ2, 4L7Y, 4M4A, 4M4B, 4MQC, 4MQG, 4MQH, 4MQI, 4MQJ, 4MQK, 4N7N, 4N7O, 4N7P, 4N8T, 4NI0, 4NI1, 4ROL, 4ROM, 4WJG, 4X0L, 4XS0, 6HBW, 5E29, 5E6E, 5EE4, 5HU6, 5JDO, 5KDQ, 5E83,%%s1Y01, 1Z8U, 1BZ1

Gene location (Human)
Chr.	Chromosome 16 (human)
Band	16p13.3	Start	172,876 bp
Band	16p13.3	End	173,710 bp

Gene location (Mouse)
Chr.	Chromosome 11 (mouse)
Band	11 A4|11 18.86 cM	Start	32,233,511 bp
Band	11 A4|11 18.86 cM	End	32,234,465 bp
RNA expression pattern
Bgee	Human / Mouse (ortholog); Top expressed in: monocyte; blood; bone marrow; bone marrow cell; placenta; spleen; apex of heart; ganglionic eminence; muscle of thigh; olfactory zone of nasal mucosa / Top expressed in: bone marrow; spleen; lung; yolk sac; neural tube; mesencephalon; heart; cerebellar cortex; genital tubercle; zone of skin; More reference expression data
BioGPS	n/a
Gene ontology
Molecular function	iron ion binding; oxygen binding; peroxidase activity; oxygen carrier activity; metal ion binding; protein binding; heme binding; haptoglobin binding; organic acid binding
Cellular component	cytosol; endocytic vesicle lumen; blood microparticle; membrane; extracellular region; cytosolic small ribosomal subunit; hemoglobin complex; extracellular exosome; haptoglobin-hemoglobin complex; extracellular space
Biological process	positive regulation of cell death; protein heterooligomerization; oxygen transport; receptor-mediated endocytosis; bicarbonate transport; hydrogen peroxide catabolic process; response to hydrogen peroxide; cellular oxidant detoxification; transport
Sources:Amigo / QuickGO
Orthologs
Databases	NCBI: entry; OMA: entry
Species	Human	Mouse
Entrez	3040	15122
Ensembl	ENSG00000188536	ENSMUSG00000069919
UniProt	P69905	Q91VB8
RefSeq (mRNA)	NM_000517	NM_008218
RefSeq (protein)	NP_000508; NP_000508.1; NP_000549.1	NP_001077424
Location (UCSC)	Chr 16: 0.17 – 0.17 Mb	Chr 11: 32.23 – 32.23 Mb
PubMed search
- Wikidata
View/Edit Human	View/Edit Mouse

Hemoglobin, alpha 2 (HBA2) is, in humans, one of two genes that codes for hemoglobin subunit alpha, the alpha globin chain of hemoglobin.

== Function ==
The human alpha globin gene cluster is located on chromosome 16 and spans about 30 kb, including seven alpha like globin genes and pseudogenes: 5'- HBZ - HBZP1 - HBM - HBAP1 - HBA2 - HBA1 - HBQ1 -3'. The HBA2 (α_{2}) and HBA1 (α_{1}) coding sequences are identical. These genes differ slightly over the 5' untranslated regions and the introns, but they differ significantly over the 3' untranslated regions.

== Protein ==
Two alpha chains plus two beta chains constitute HbA, which in normal adult life accounts for about 97% of the total hemoglobin; alpha chains combine with delta chains to constitute HbA-2, which with HbF (fetal hemoglobin), composed of alpha and gamma chains, make up the remaining 3% of adult hemoglobin.

== Clinical significance ==
Alpha-thalassemias most commonly result from deletions of any of the four alpha alleles, although some alpha thalassemias have been reported that are due to mutations other than deletion. Deletion of 1 or 2 alleles is clinically silent. Deletion of 3 alleles causes HbH disease, resulting in anemia and hepatosplenomegaly. Deletion of all 4 alleles is lethal because it renders the body unable to make fetal hemoglobin (HbF), adult hemoglobin (HbA) or adult variant hemoglobin (HbA2), and results in hydrops fetalis.
