= Hemoglobin subunit zeta =

Mammalian protein found in Homo sapiens

HBZ
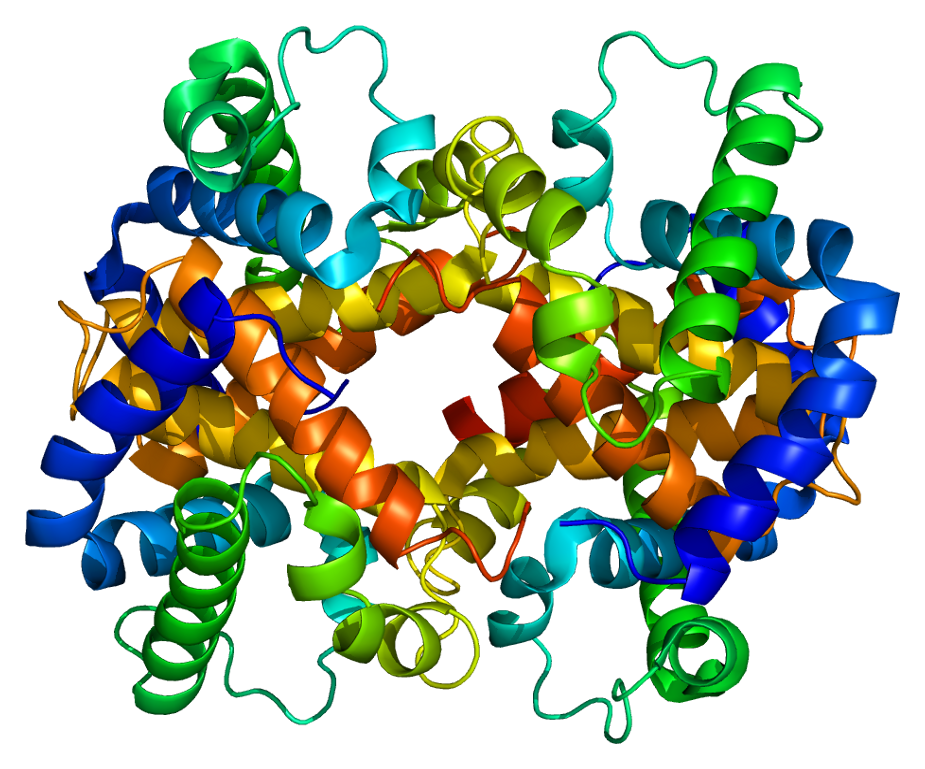
Available structures
PDB	Ortholog search: PDBe RCSB
PDB	List of PDB id codes 1JEB, 3W4U

Identifiers
- Aliases: HBZ, HBZ-T1, HBZ1, hemoglobin subunit zeta, HBAZ
- External IDs: OMIM: 142310; MGI: 96019; HomoloGene: 110705; GeneCards: HBZ; OMA:HBZ - orthologs

Gene location (Human)
Chr.	Chromosome 16 (human)
Band	16p13.3	Start	142,728 bp
Band	16p13.3	End	154,503 bp

Gene location (Mouse)
Chr.	Chromosome 11 (mouse)
Band	11 A4|11 18.86 cM	Start	32,226,400 bp
Band	11 A4|11 18.86 cM	End	32,228,116 bp
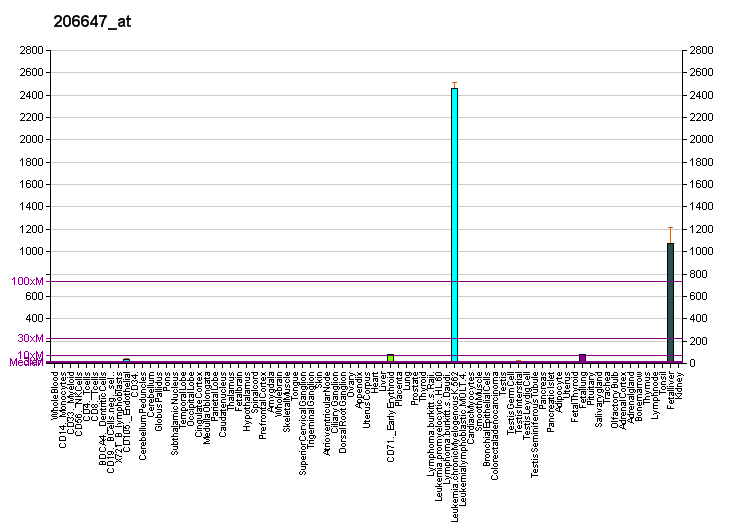

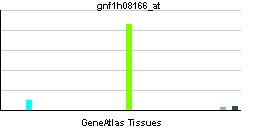

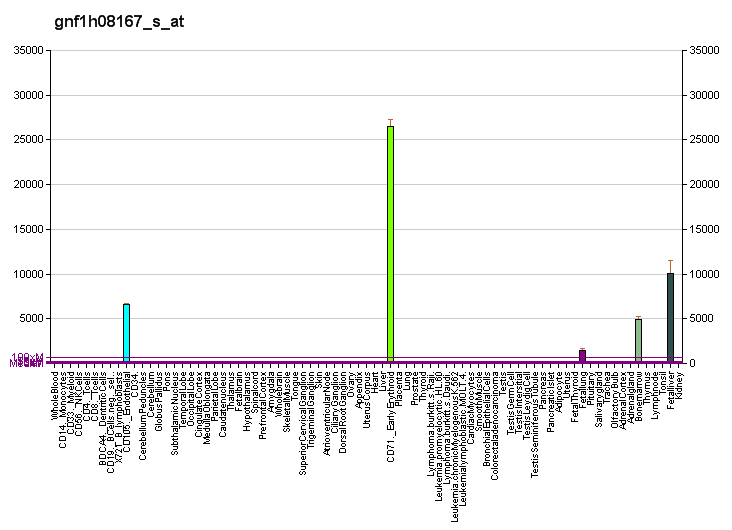
RNA expression pattern
Bgee	Human / Mouse (ortholog); Top expressed in: testicle; left testis; right testis; blood; ganglionic eminence; bone marrow; subcutaneous adipose tissue; anterior cingulate cortex; amygdala; ectocervix / Top expressed in: yolk sac; tail of embryo; genital tubercle; abdominal wall; maxillary prominence; internal carotid artery; mandibular prominence; external carotid artery; hand; somite; More reference expression data
BioGPS	More reference expression data
Gene ontology
Molecular function	iron ion binding; oxygen binding; protein binding; heme binding; metal ion binding; oxygen carrier activity; peroxidase activity; haptoglobin binding; organic acid binding
Cellular component	hemoglobin complex; extracellular exosome; haptoglobin-hemoglobin complex
Biological process	oxygen transport; negative regulation of transcription by RNA polymerase II; erythrocyte maturation; transport; hydrogen peroxide catabolic process; protein heterooligomerization; cellular oxidant detoxification
Sources:Amigo / QuickGO
Orthologs
Species	Human	Mouse
Entrez	3050	15126
Ensembl	ENSG00000130656	ENSMUSG00000055609
UniProt	P02008	P06467
RefSeq (mRNA)	NM_005332	NM_010405
RefSeq (protein)	NP_005323	NP_034535
Location (UCSC)	Chr 16: 0.14 – 0.15 Mb	Chr 11: 32.23 – 32.23 Mb
PubMed search
- Wikidata
View/Edit Human	View/Edit Mouse

Hemoglobin subunit zeta is a protein that in humans is encoded by the HBZ gene.

Zeta-globin is an alpha-like hemoglobin. The zeta-globin polypeptide is synthesized in the yolk sac of the early embryo, while alpha-globin is produced throughout fetal and adult life. The zeta-globin gene is a member of the human alpha-globin gene cluster that includes five functional genes and two pseudogenes. The order of genes is: 5' - zeta - pseudozeta - mu - pseudoalpha-1 - alpha-2 - alpha-1 - theta1 - 3'.
