= Phytoglobin =

Plant proteins

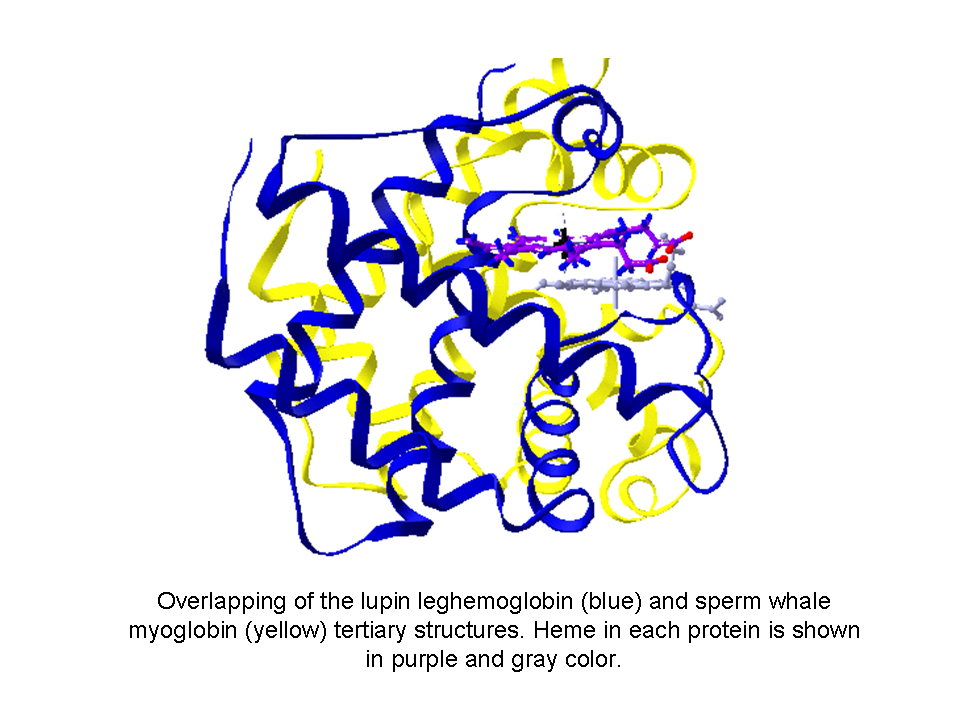

Phytoglobins are globular plant (algae and land plant) proteins classified into the globin superfamily, which contain a heme, i.e. protoporphyrin IX-Fe, prosthetic group. The earliest known phytoglobins are leghemoglobins, discovered in 1939 by Kubo after spectroscopic and chemical analysis of the red pigment of soybean root nodules. A few decades after Kubo's report the crystallization of a lupin phytoglobin (known as leghemoglobin) by Vainshtein and collaborators revealed that the tertiary structure of this protein and that of the sperm whale myoglobin was remarkably similar, thus indicating that the phytoglobin discovered by Kubo did indeed correspond to a globin.

One important function of phytoglobin is its nitric oxide dioxygenase activity.

== Distribution and classification ==
Phytoglobins (abbreviated as Phytogbs) are ubiquitously distributed in both green algae and land plants. They can be classified as follows:

- 2/2 Phytogb3
  - Cyanobacteria
  - - Green Algae
    - - Mosses
      - - Lycophytes
        - - Gymnosperm
          - - - Dicot non-legume
              - Monocots
            - - Legume group 3-1
              - - Legume group 3-2
                - two Amaranthaceae sequences

- 3/3
  - Green algae ("Phytogb0")
  - - Phytogb1 monocot
    - - Phytogb1 dicot
      - - Phytogb2 dicot
        - Lb

Relationship among major Phytogb groups according to Becana et al. (2020)
- 2/2 Phytoglobins (truncated globin family, TrHb2 subfamily)
  - Phytogb3: found in cyanobacateria, algae, and land plants.
- 3/3 Phytoglobins (myoglobin-like family)
  - Phytogb0: the basal type, found in algae, bryophytes and gymnosperms.
  - Phytogb1, 2: only found in angiosperms.
    - Phytogb1: splits into two parts for monocots and dicots respectively.
    - Phytogb2: exclusively found in dicots.
    - Lb: leghemoglobin, the legume symbiotic globin.

Non-legume symbiotic globins (SymPhytogbs) are scattered among Phytogb1 and Phytogb2. Symbiotic globins generally provide oxygen to symbiotic bacteria that perform nitrogen-fixing. In legumes the bacteria are rhizobia, but in some actinorhizal plants actinomycete Frankia do the job instead.

== Structural characteristics ==
Phytogbs are coded by genes interrupted by 3 introns (although a 4 introns-containing phytogb gene has been detected in the moss Physcomitrella patens ). The first and third intron of the phytogb genes are localized in the same position as that of the myoglobin genes, which suggests that phytogb and myoglobin genes evolved from a common ancestor more than 600 million years ago. The existence of a second intron in the phytogb genes was predicted by Go using theoretical analysis, which was further verified by cloning and sequencing of soybean lb genes by Marker and collaborators.

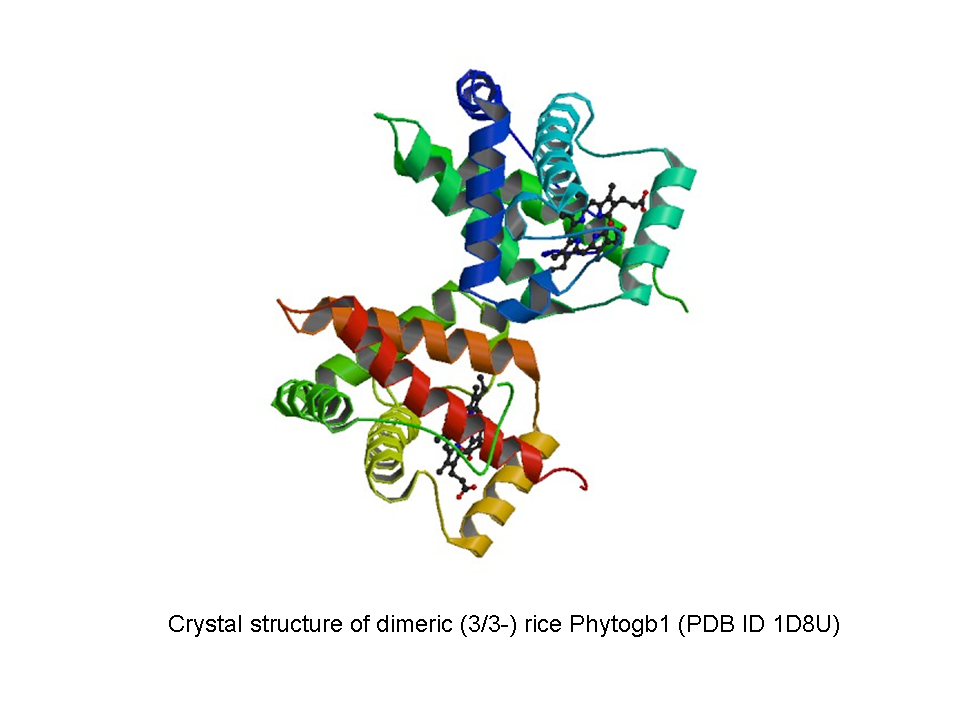

Phytogbs are monomeric proteins whose molecular mass ranges from ~17 to ~19 kDa. However, at high (more than 1 mM) concentrations Phytogbs can form dimers. Phytogbs polypeptide chain folds into a particular arrangement of 6 to 7 helices (named with letters A to H) known as the globin fold which forms a hydrophobic pocket where heme is located. Two types of the globin fold have been identified in Phytogbs: the 3/3- and 2/2-folding, where helices A, E and F overlap to helices B, G and H and helices B and E overlap to helices G and H, respectively.

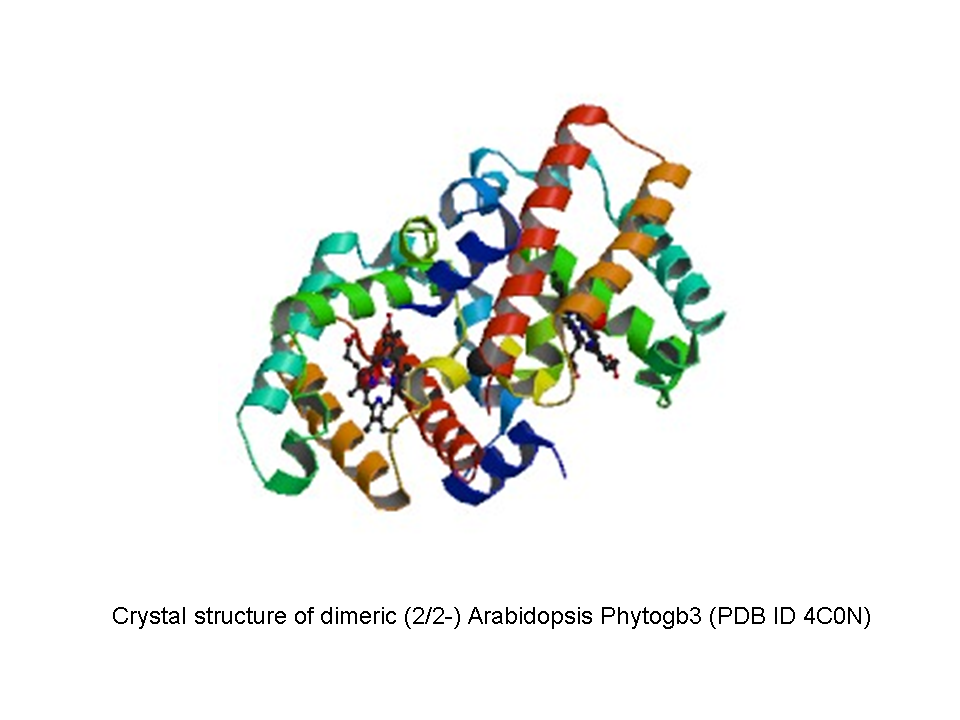

Like other globins, heme-Fe in Phytogbs is coordinated at the proximal region by a His amino acid (named as proximal His). The distal region of heme-Fe can be occupied by either a variety of ligands (such as oxygen and nitric oxide) or a distal (frequently a His) amino acid, giving place to penta- or hexa-coordinate Phytogbs, respectively. The Phytogbs2, SymPhytogbs and Lbs are predominantly penta-coordinate whereas Phytogbs1 are predominantly hexa-coordinate and Phytogbs0 and Phytogbs3 are a combination of penta- and hexa-coordinate. Heme-Fe coordination is essential for Phytogb (and other globins) function because it regulates the rate of ligand-binding and –releasing as consequence of the kinetic constants k_{on} and k_{off}, respectively. For example, the affinity of soybean Lb and rice Phytogb1 for O_{2} (KO_{2}) is moderate and very high because k_{on} is 130 and 68 mM^{−1} s^{−1}, k_{off} is 5.6 and 0.038 s^{−1} and KO_{2} (i.e. the O_{2}-affinity resulting from k_{on}/k_{off}) is 23 and 1800 mM^{−1}, respectively. This indicates that soybean Lb could function as an O_{2}-storage or –transport protein and that the function of rice Phytogb1 (and other hexa-coordinate Phytogbs) could be other than O_{2}-transport because the high affinity of this protein for O_{2} results from an extremely low k_{off} constant.

== Synthesis and postulated functions ==
Like other globins, penta-coordinate Phytogbs reversibly bind and transport O_{2}. The function of Lbs in nodules was elucidated in 1974 by Wittenberg, Appleby and others. In nodules the concentration of Lbs is very high as they correspond to ~30% of the total soluble proteins. The apparent function of Lbs in nodules is to facilitate the diffusion of O_{2} to the respiring bacteroids for nitrogen-fixation. At the same time, Lb contributes to maintain low O_{2}-levels (~10 nM) to avoid inactivation of the O_{2}-sensitive nitrogenase that fixes the atmospheric nitrogen.

Furthermore, Phytogbs bind other gaseous ligands, most notably nitric oxide (NO), and exhibit a NO dioxygenase activity. Work by Hill and collaborators during the last ~15 years has shown that levels of endogenous NO varies with the concentration of Phytogbs1 in transgenic maize and alfalfa. Based on these observations, these authors have proposed that a function of oxygenated Phytogbs is to modulate levels of NO via an NO dioxygenase activity and to indirectly regulate a wide variety of cell functions that are modulated by levels of NO. Oxygenated class 1 phytoglobins reacting with NO to produce nitrate represent the main mechanism by which NO is scavenged in plants. The cycle involving nitrate reductase, reduction of nitrite to NO, scavenging NO by phytoglobin was defined as the phytoglobin-NO cycle. Its operation leads to the maintenance of redox and energy status during hypoxia and results in the reduced production of ethanol and lactic acid.

Phytogbs0, 1, 2 and 3 are synthesized at very low concentrations in diverse (embryonic and vegetative) plant organs. However, concentrations of Phytogbs increase in plants subjected to specific stress conditions, such as flooding and light-limitation. Hence, some Phytogbs have been considered as plant stress-responsive proteins.

== Evolution ==
Work by Arredondo-Peter, Vinogradov and collaborators has elucidated the major events that could have occurred during the evolution of Phytogbs. Although Phytogbs evolved from a common ancestor previous to the origin of eukaryotes (i.e. in the eubacteria domain), in plants two evolutionary lineages have been identified for Phytogbs: the (3/3-) Phytogb0, 1 and 2 and SymPhytogb and Lb lineage and the (2/2-) Phytogb3 lineage. Apparently, Phytogbs0 were the ancestors to Phytogbs1 and 2, and SymPhytogbs and Lbs evolved from a Phytogb1 ancestor as an adaptation to the symbiotic nitrogen-fixation. Comparative analysis of moss Phytogb0 with rice Phytogb1 and soybean Lb structure revealed that the major evolutionary changes that probably occurred during the evolution of Phytogbs0, 1 and 2, SymPhytogbs and Lbs were (i) a hexa-coordinate to penta-coordinate transition at the heme group, (ii) a length decrease at the CD-loop and N- and C-termini, and (iii) the compaction of the protein into a globular structure. Furthermore, the structure of the globin domain from Phytogbs3 is highly similar to that of bacterial truncated globins indicating that the 2/2-folding conserved during the evolution of Phytogbs3. However, globin domain from land plant Phytogbs3 is flanked by extra-amino acid sequences that probably originated in the ancestor to land plant Phytogbs3. The functional and evolutionary significance of the extra-amino acid sequences in the Phytogbs3 structure is still not known.

== Technological applications ==
Phytogbs are potentially useful for a number of biotechnological applications. For example, shortly after the discovery of rice Phytogbs1 an intended application was the use of these proteins as O_{2}-sensors in electronic devices. Also, over-expression of Phytogbs has been proposed as a strategy to increase crop tolerance to specific stress conditions, such as crop flooding, as it couples the early flooding signal ethylene to the low oxygen response of plants. Recently, Phytogbs were considered candidates for developing blood substitutes and as additives in veggie burgers.
