= HBQ1 =

Mammalian protein found in Homo sapiens

Identifiers
- Aliases: HBQ1, HBQ, hemoglobin subunit theta 1
- External IDs: OMIM: 142240; MGI: 3613460; HomoloGene: 3895; GeneCards: HBQ1; OMA:HBQ1 - orthologs

Gene location (Human)
Chr.	Chromosome 16 (human)
Band	16p13.3	Start	180,459 bp
Band	16p13.3	End	181,179 bp

Gene location (Mouse)
Chr.	Chromosome 11 (mouse)
Band	11|11 A4	Start	32,236,965 bp
Band	11|11 A4	End	32,237,784 bp
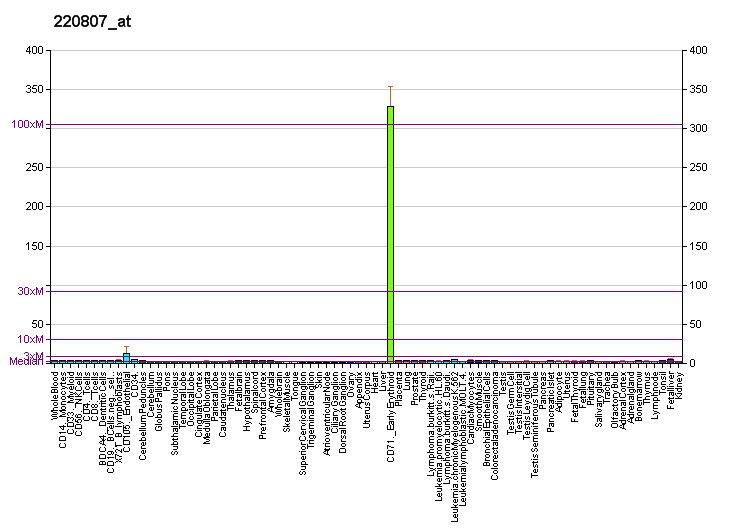
RNA expression pattern
Bgee	Human / Mouse (ortholog); Top expressed in: blood; testicle; monocyte; gonad; trabecular bone; anterior cingulate cortex; nucleus accumbens; bone marrow; amygdala; Brodmann area 9 / Top expressed in: bone marrow; yolk sac; embryo; spleen; embryo; lobe of liver; placenta; primary visual cortex; dentate gyrus of hippocampal formation granule cell; superior frontal gyrus; More reference expression data
BioGPS	More reference expression data
Gene ontology
Molecular function	iron ion binding; oxygen binding; protein binding; heme binding; metal ion binding; oxygen carrier activity; peroxidase activity; haptoglobin binding; organic acid binding
Cellular component	hemoglobin complex; haptoglobin-hemoglobin complex
Biological process	oxygen transport; hydrogen peroxide catabolic process; protein heterooligomerization; cellular oxidant detoxification
Sources:Amigo / QuickGO
Orthologs
Species	Human	Mouse
Entrez	3049	544763
Ensembl	ENSG00000086506	ENSMUSG00000073063
UniProt	P09105	Q3U0A6
RefSeq (mRNA)	NM_005331	NM_001033981
RefSeq (protein)	NP_005322	NP_001029153
Location (UCSC)	Chr 16: 0.18 – 0.18 Mb	Chr 11: 32.24 – 32.24 Mb
PubMed search
- Wikidata
View/Edit Human	View/Edit Mouse

Hemoglobin subunit theta-1 is a protein that in humans is encoded by the HBQ1 gene.

Theta-globin mRNA is found in human fetal erythroid tissue but not in adult erythroid or other nonerythroid tissue. The theta-1 gene may be expressed very early in embryonic life, perhaps sometime before 5 weeks. Theta-1 is a member of the human alpha-globin gene cluster that involves five functional genes and two pseudogenes. The order of genes is: 5' - zeta - pseudozeta - mu - pseudoalpha-1 - alpha-2 - alpha-1 - theta-1 - 3'. Research supports a transcriptionally active role for the gene and a functional role for the peptide in specific cells, possibly those of early erythroid tissue.
