= Mu hemoglobin =

Protein found in humans

HBM

Identifiers
- Aliases: HBM, HBAP2, HBK, hemoglobin subunit mu
- External IDs: OMIM: 609639; GeneCards: HBM

Gene location (Human)
Chr.	Chromosome 16 (human)
Band	16p13.3	Start	153,892 bp
Band	16p13.3	End	166,764 bp
RNA expression pattern
Bgee	Human / Mouse (ortholog); Top expressed in: trabecular bone; bone marrow; blood; bone marrow cell; monocyte; placenta; spleen; biceps brachii; ganglionic eminence; decidua / n/a; More reference expression data
BioGPS	n/a
Gene ontology
Molecular function	oxygen binding; heme binding; metal ion binding; oxygen carrier activity; peroxidase activity; protein binding; haptoglobin binding; organic acid binding
Cellular component	hemoglobin complex; haptoglobin-hemoglobin complex
Biological process	oxygen transport; hydrogen peroxide catabolic process; protein heterooligomerization; cellular oxidant detoxification
Sources:Amigo / QuickGO
Orthologs
Databases	NCBI: entry; OMA: entry
Species	Human	Mouse
Entrez	3042	n/a
Ensembl	ENSG00000206177	n/a
UniProt	Q6B0K9	n/a
RefSeq (mRNA)	NM_001003938	n/a
RefSeq (protein)	NP_001003938	n/a
Location (UCSC)	Chr 16: 0.15 – 0.17 Mb	n/a
PubMed search		n/a
- Wikidata
View/Edit Human

Mu hemoglobin is a protein that in humans is encoded by the HBM gene. The order of genes is: 5' - zeta - pseudozeta - mu - pseudoalpha-1 - alpha-2 - alpha-1 - theta1 - 3'.
