= Cytoglobin =

Mammalian protein found in Homo sapiens

CYGB
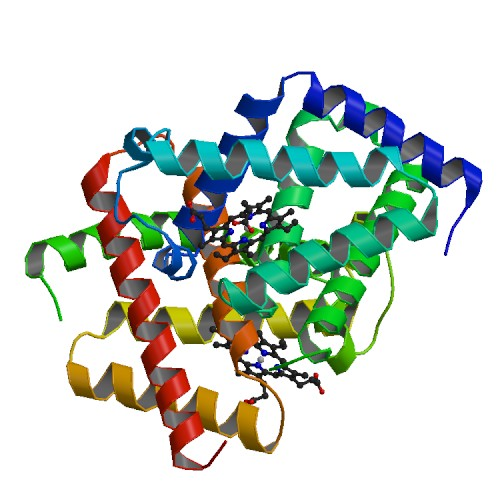

Identifiers
- Aliases: CYGB, HGB, STAP, cytoglobin
- External IDs: OMIM: 608759; MGI: 2149481; GeneCards: CYGB
Available structures
PDB	Ortholog search: PDBe RCSB
PDB	List of PDB id codes 1UMO, 1URV, 1URY, 1UT0, 1UX9, 1V5H, 2DC3, 3AG0, 4B3W
Enzyme activity
EC #	BRENDA	ExPASy	KEGG	MetaCyc
1.15.1.1	↗	↗	↗	↗

Gene location (Human)
Chr.	Chromosome 17 (human)
Band	17q25.1	Start	76,527,356 bp
Band	17q25.1	End	76,551,175 bp

Gene location (Mouse)
Chr.	Chromosome 11 (mouse)
Band	11|11 E2	Start	116,536,421 bp
Band	11|11 E2	End	116,545,139 bp
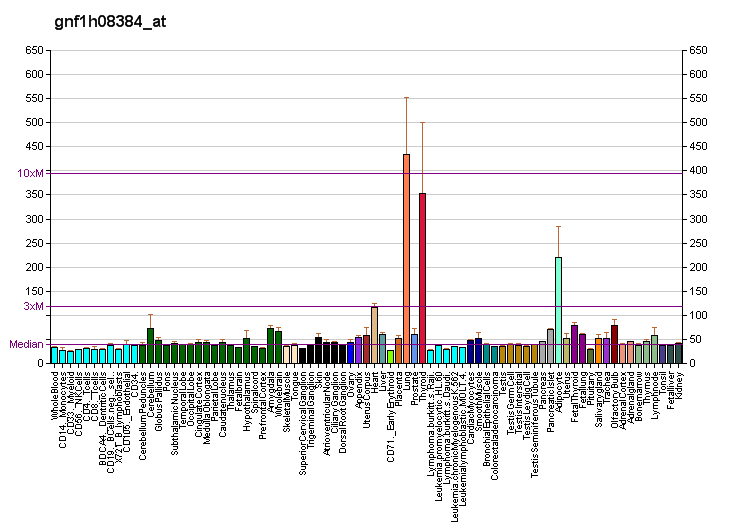
RNA expression pattern
Bgee	Human / Mouse (ortholog); Top expressed in: cardiac muscle tissue of right atrium; myocardium of left ventricle; right auricle of heart; apex of heart; subcutaneous adipose tissue; right lobe of thyroid gland; left lobe of thyroid gland; gastric mucosa; canal of the cervix; mucosa of ileum / Top expressed in: interventricular septum; aortic valve; ascending aorta; habenula; dorsal tegmental nucleus; ankle; lateral hypothalamus; central gray substance of midbrain; neural layer of retina; medial vestibular nucleus; More reference expression data
BioGPS	More reference expression data
Gene ontology
Molecular function	fatty acid peroxidase activity; metal ion binding; heme binding; peroxidase activity; catalase activity; nitric oxide dioxygenase activity; oxygen binding; oxygen carrier activity; iron ion binding; protein binding
Cellular component	cytoplasm; cytosol; neuron projection; soma; nuclear speck
Biological process	response to hypoxia; response to oxidative stress; negative regulation of hepatic stellate cell activation; negative regulation of collagen biosynthetic process; fatty acid oxidation; regulation of nitric-oxide synthase activity; negative regulation of fibroblast migration; cellular oxidant detoxification; oxygen transport
Sources:Amigo / QuickGO
Orthologs
Databases	NCBI: entry; OMA: entry
Species	Human	Mouse
Entrez	114757	114886
Ensembl	ENSG00000161544	ENSMUSG00000020810
UniProt	Q8WWM9	Q9CX80
RefSeq (mRNA)	NM_134268	NM_030206
RefSeq (protein)	NP_599030	NP_084482
Location (UCSC)	Chr 17: 76.53 – 76.55 Mb	Chr 11: 116.54 – 116.55 Mb
PubMed search
- Wikidata
View/Edit Human	View/Edit Mouse

Cytoglobin is the protein product of CYGB, a human and mammalian gene.

Cytoglobin is a globin molecule ubiquitously expressed in all tissues and most notably utilized in marine mammals. It was discovered in 2001 in hepatic stellate cells during liver fibrosis. Thus, it was originally called "stellate cell activated protein" or STAP. It received its current name in 2002. It is thought to help in the distribution and storage of oxygen as well as protect against hypoxia by scavenging reactive oxygen species . The predicted function of cytoglobin is the facilitation of oxygen among tissues that don't express myoglobin.

== Function ==
Cytoglobin is a ubiquitously expressed hexacoordinate hemoglobin that may facilitate diffusion of oxygen through tissues, scavenge nitric oxide or reactive oxygen species, or serve a protective function during oxidative stress.

== Structure ==
Cytoglobin has 30-40% sequence homology with myoglobin, and has a similar oxygen binding affinity. One of the major differences is the presence of a 20 amino acids extension at both the n and c terminus.

Cytoglobin is a hexacoordinate heme protein. The heme iron in coordinated with histidine residues on both sides, HisF8 and HisE7. The HisE7 is considered to be an "endogenous ligand." In order for oxygen or another gaseous ligand to bind, the HisE7 must dissociate from the iron, making the binding kinetics relatively slow.

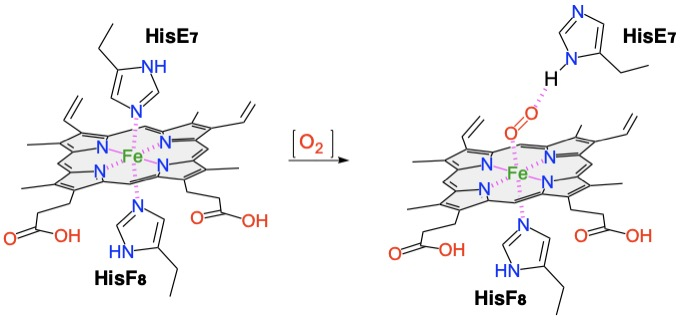
Diagram of how the heme group in cytoglobin interacts with the surrounding amino acids of the globin protein. Normally, the iron is coordinated with histidine residues on both sides. The HisE7 must be dissociated in order for oxygen to bind.

In an oxidizing environment, a disulfide bond between Cys38 and Cys83 of the protein forms and causes a conformational change to move HisE7 out of the way, allowing oxygen to bind. Thus, oxygen binding is dependent on the redox state of the tissue.

== Applications ==
CYGB expression can be used as a specific marker with which hepatic stellate cells can be distinguished from portal myofibroblasts in the damaged human liver.
