= Leghemoglobin =

Oxygen-carrying phytoglobin found in rhizome of leguminous plants

Leghaemoglobin, iron-binding site

Identifiers
- Symbol: Leghaemoglobin_Fe_BS
- InterPro: IPR019824
- PROSITE: PS00208
Available protein structures:
- PDB: IPR019824
- AlphaFold: IPR019824

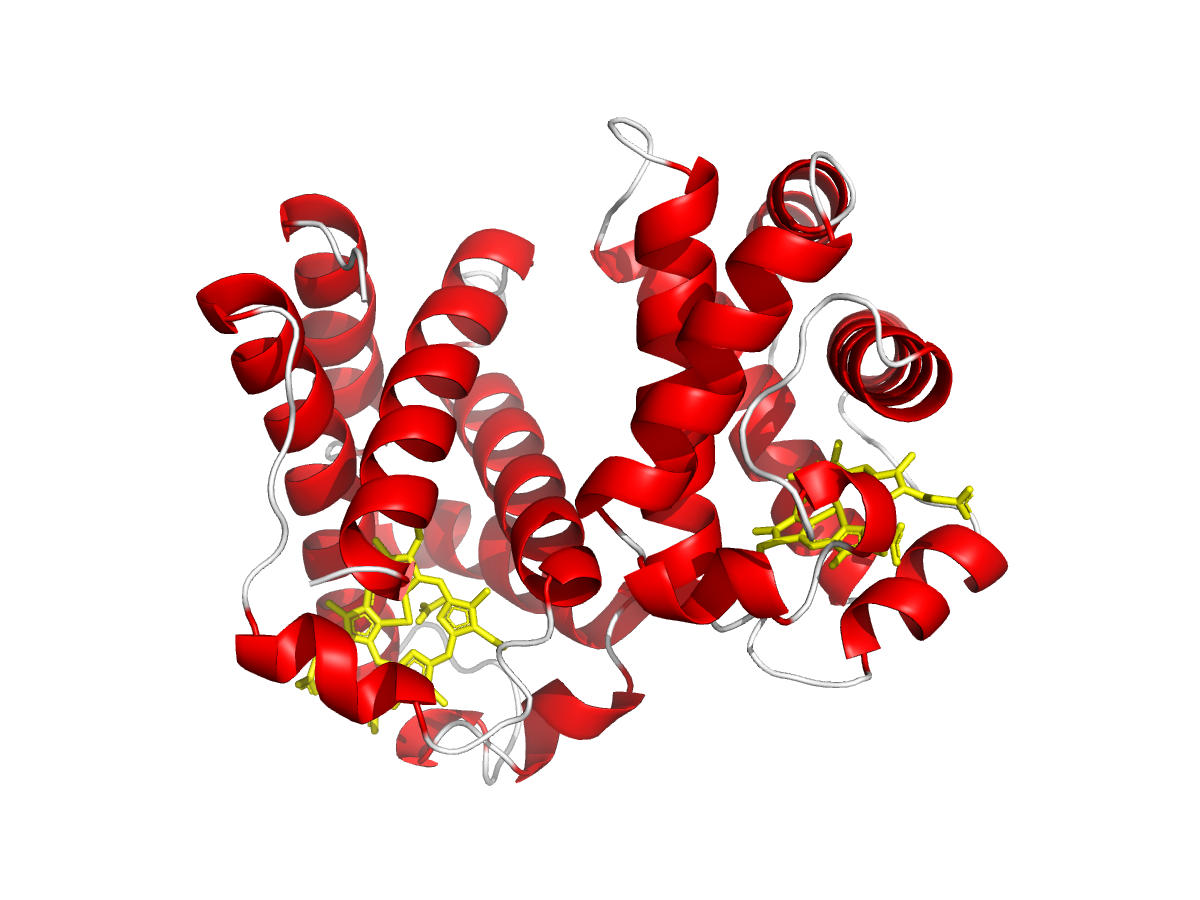
Leghemoglobin A from a soybean (PDB: 1BIN)

Leghemoglobin (also leghaemoglobin or legoglobin) is an oxygen-carrying phytoglobin found in the nitrogen-fixing root nodules of leguminous plants. It is produced by these plants in response to the roots being colonized by nitrogen-fixing bacteria, termed rhizobia, as part of the symbiotic interaction between plant and bacterium: roots not colonized by Rhizobium do not synthesise leghemoglobin. Leghemoglobin has close chemical and structural similarities to hemoglobin, and, like hemoglobin, is red in colour. It was originally thought that the heme prosthetic group for plant leghemoglobin was provided by the bacterial symbiont within symbiotic root nodules. However, subsequent work shows that the plant host strongly expresses heme biosynthesis genes within nodules, and that activation of those genes correlates with leghemoglobin gene expression in developing nodules.

In plants colonised by Rhizobium, such as alfalfa or soybeans, the presence of oxygen in the root nodules would reduce the activity of the oxygen-sensitive nitrogenase, which is an enzyme responsible for the fixation of atmospheric nitrogen. Leghemoglobin is shown to buffer the concentration of free oxygen in the cytoplasm of infected plant cells to ensure the proper function of root nodules. That being said, nitrogen fixation is an extremely energetically costly process, so aerobic respiration, which necessitates high oxygen concentration, is necessary in the cells of the root nodule. Leghemoglobin maintains a free oxygen concentration that is low enough to allow nitrogenase to function, but a high enough total oxygen concentration (free and bound to leghemoglobin) for aerobic respiration.

Leghemoglobin falls into the class of symbiotic globins, which also include the root nodules globins of actinorhizal plants such as Casuarina. The Casuarina symbiotic globin is intermediate between leghemoglobin and nonsymbiotic phytoglobin-2.

== Structure ==
Leghemoglobins are monomeric proteins with a mass around 16 kDa, and are structurally similar to myoglobin. One leghemoglobin protein consists of a heme bound to an iron, and one polypeptide chain (the globin). Similar to myoglobin and hemoglobin, the iron of heme is found in its ferrous state in vivo, and is the moiety that binds oxygen. Despite similarities in the mechanism of oxygen binding between leghemoglobin and animal hemoglobin, and the fact that leghemoglobin and animal hemoglobin evolved from a common ancestor, there is dissimilarity in amino acid sequence between these proteins at about 80% of positions.

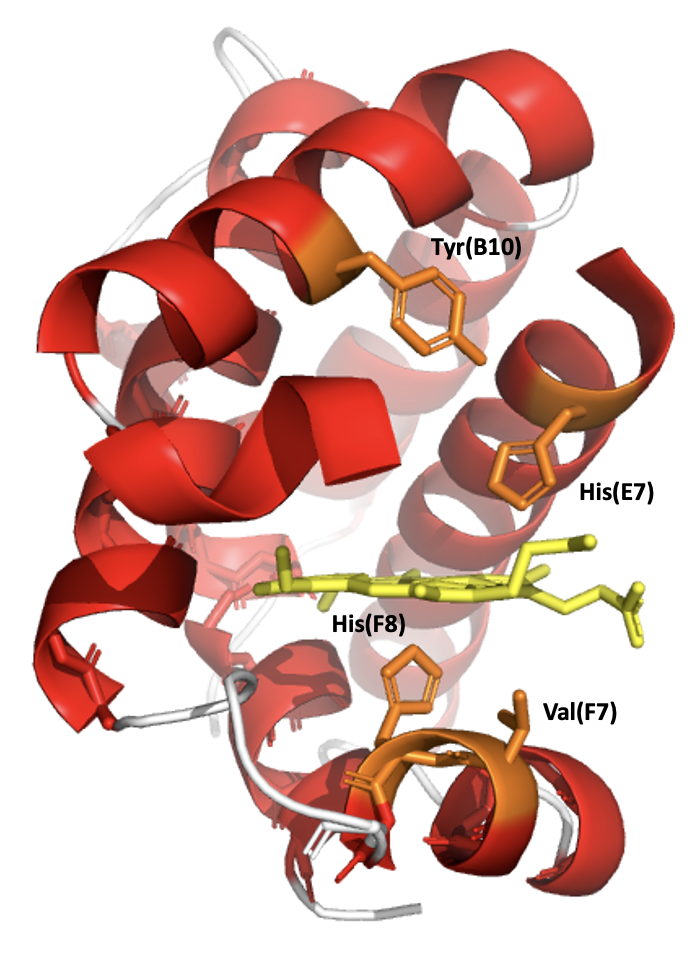
Oxygen Stabilization of Leghemoglobin A (PDB: 1BIN)

Oxygen binding affinities of leghemoglobins are between 11 and 24 times higher than oxygen binding affinities of sperm whale myoglobin. Differences in the affinities are due to differential rates of association between the two types of proteins. One explanation of this phenomenon is that in myoglobin, a bound water molecule is stabilized in a pocket surrounding the heme group. This water group must be displaced in order for oxygen to bind. No such water is bound in the analogous pocket of leghemoglobin, so it is easier for an oxygen molecule to approach the leghemoglobin heme. Leghemoglobin has a slow oxygen dissociation rate, similar to myoglobin. Like myoglobin and hemoglobin, leghemoglobin has a high affinity for carbon monoxide.

In the primary structure of Leghemoglobin A in soybeans, a valine(F7) is found in place where a serine(F7) is in Myoglobin. Without a hydrogen bond fixing the orientation of the proximal histidine side chain the imidazole ring can occupy a staggered conformation between pyrrole nitrogen atoms and can readily move upward to the heme plane. This greatly increases the reactivity of the iron atom and oxygen affinity. In Leghemoglobin A the distal histidine side chain is also rotated away from the bound ligand by formation of a hydrogen bond with Tyrosine.

Heme groups are the same in all known leghemoglobins, but the amino acid sequence of the globin differs slightly depending on bacterial strain and legume species. Even within one leguminous plant, multiple isoforms of leghemoglobins can exist. These often differ in oxygen affinity, and help meet the needs of a cell in a particular environment within the nodule.

== Debate on principal function ==
Results of a 1995 study suggested that the low free oxygen concentration in root nodule cells is actually due to the low oxygen permeability of root nodule cells. It follows that the main purpose of leghemoglobin is to scavenge the limited free oxygen in the cell and deliver it to mitochondria for respiration. But, scientists of a later 2005 article suggest that leghemoglobin is responsible both for buffering oxygen concentration, and for delivery of oxygen to mitochondria. Their leghemoglobin knockout studies showed that leghemoglobin actually does significantly decrease the free oxygen concentration in root nodule cells, and that nitrogenase expression was eliminated in leghemoglobin knockout mutants, assumably due to the degradation of nitrogenase with high free oxygen concentration. Their study also showed a higher ATP/ADP ratio in wild-type root nodule cells with active leghemoglobin, suggesting that leghemoglobin also assists with delivery of oxygen for respiration.

Plants contain both symbiotic and nonsymbiotic hemoglobins. Symbiotic hemoglobins are thought to be important for symbiotic nitrogen fixation (SNF). In legume, SNF takes place in specialized organs called nodules which contain bacteroids, or nitrogen fixing rhizobia. The induction of nodule-specific plant genes, which include those that encode for symbiotic leghemoglobins (Lb), accompany nodule development. Leghemoglobins accumulate to millimolar concentrations in the cytoplasm of infected plant cells prior to nitrogen fixation to buffer free oxygen in the nanomolar range, which can avoid inactivation of oxygen-labile nitrogenase while keeping a high enough oxygen flux for respiration in the cell. The leghemoglobins are required for SNF but are not required for plant growth and development in the presence of an external source of fixed nitrogen. Leghemoglobins make the essential contribution of establishing low free-oxygen concentrations while keep a high energy status in cells. These are the conditions necessary for effective SNF.

== Other plant hemoglobins ==
Globins have since been identified as a protein common to many plant taxa, not restricted to symbiotic ones. In light of this discovery, it has been proposed that the term phytoglobins be used for referring to plant globins in general.

Phytoglobins can be divided into two clades. The 3/3-fold type contains Classes I and II of angiosperm phytoglobins, and is the one common to all eukaryotes (HGT of a bacterial flavohemoglobin). The leghemoglobin sensu stricto is a class II phytoglobin. The 2/2-fold "TrHb2" type contains class III in angiosperm nomenclature, and appears to be acquired from Chloroflexota (formerly Chloroflexi) by the ancestor of land plants.

== Commercial use ==
Impossible Foods asked the American FDA for their approval to use recombinant soy leghemoglobin made by Pichia pastoris in meat alternatives as an analog of meat-derived hemoglobin. Approval from the FDA came in July 2019, was challenged, (Note: filed by the non-profit advocacy organization Center for Food Safety) and later upheld, on May 3, 2021, by a San Francisco federal appeals court. It is currently being used in their products to mimic the color, taste, and texture of meat.

== See also ==
- Hemocyanin
- Hemoglobin
- Myoglobin
- Phytoglobin
