= Mucous membrane pemphigoid =

Autoimmune blistering disease

- Other names: Cicatricial pemphigoid; MMP, Benign mucosal pemphigoid, Benign mucous membrane pemphigoid, Ocular pemphigoid, and Scarring pemphigoid)
- Specialty: Dermatology

Mucous membrane pemphigoid is a rare chronic autoimmune subepithelial blistering disease characterized by erosive lesions of the mucous membranes and skin. It is one of the pemphigoid diseases that can result in scarring.

== Signs and symptoms ==
The autoimmune reaction most commonly affects the oral mucosa in the mouth, causing lesions in the gums (gingiva), known as desquamative gingivitis. More severe cases can also affect areas of mucous membrane elsewhere in the body, such as the sinuses, genitals, anus, and cornea. When the cornea of the eye is affected, repeated scarring may result in blindness.

Brunsting–Perry cicatricial pemphigoid is a rare variant of mucous membrane pemphigoid involving the scalp and the neck without mucosal involvement. It is proposed by some authors that this be called a variant of epidermolysis bullosa acquisita.

Nikolsky's sign (gentle lateral pressure) on unaffected mucosa or skin raises a bulla. If no lesions are present on examination it may be useful way of demonstrating reduced epithelial adhesion. In contrast, in Pemphigus, the epithelium tends to disintegrate rather than form a bulla.

Nikolsky's sign is present in pemphigus and mucous membrane pemphigoid, but not in bullous pemphigoid.

== Pathophysiology ==
In mucous membrane pemphigoid, the autoimmune reaction occurs in the skin, specifically at the level of the basement membrane, which connects the lower skin layer (dermis) to the upper skin layer (epidermis) and keeps it attached to the body.

When the condition is active, the basement membrane is dissolved by the antibodies produced, and areas of skin lift away at the base, causing hard blisters which scar if they burst. In other words, this is a desquamating/blistering disease in which the epithelium "unzips" from the underlying connective tissue, allowing fluid to gather that subsequently manifest as bullae, or blisters.

Various forms of MMP have been described with the most common being, classic/oral MMP where antibodies attack the C-Terminus of BPAG-2 (BP180). In the ocular form, the antigen identified is the β4 subuniti of α6β4 integrin. One other notable form is the anti-epillegrin form of MMP, where the target antigen is Laminin 332.

== Diagnosis ==
Diagnostic techniques:

- antibodies (IgG) precipitate complement (C3) in the lamina lucida of the basement membrane.
- Circulating auto-antibodies to BP-1 antigen (located in hemidesmosome). 50% have BP-2.
- Positive Nikolsky sign.
- IgG, C3 deposition at BM creating smooth line in immunofluorescent analysis.

== Management ==
The management depends upon the severity of the condition. For example, where there are lesions in the mouth alone, systemic drugs are less likely to be used. Where the condition is not limited to the mouth, or where there is poor response to Topical treatments, systemic drugs are more likely to be used.

=== Conservative ===
Simple measures that can be taken include avoidance of hard, sharp or rough foods, and taking care when eating. Good oral hygiene is also usually advised, and professional oral hygiene measures such as dental scaling.

=== Medications ===
Topical and intralesional (injected into the affected areas) corticosteroid drugs may be used, such as fluocinonide, clobetasol propionate or triamcinolone acetonide. Oral candidiasis may develop with long term topical steroid use, and sometimes antimycotics such as miconazole gel or chlorhexidine mouthwash are used to prevent this. Topical ciclosporin is sometimes used.

Dapsone is sometimes used as a steroid sparing agent. The dose is often increased very slowly in order to minimize side effects. Systemic steroids, such as prednisone or prednisolone may be needed in severe cases. Many other drugs have been used to treat mucous membrane pemphoid, including azathioprine, cyclophosphamide, methotrexate, thalidomide, mycophenolate mofetil, leflunomide, sulphasalazine, sulphapuridine, sulphamethoxypiridazine, tetracyclines (e.g. minocycline, doxycycline) and nicotinamide.

=== Other treatments ===
Plasmapheresis appears to help some cases. Sometimes surgical procedures are required to repair scars, prevent complications such as blindness, upper airway stenosis or esophageal stricture.

== See also ==
- Gestational pemphigoid
- List of cutaneous conditions
- List of target antigens in pemphigoid
- List of immunofluorescence findings for autoimmune bullous conditions
