= List of target antigens in pemphigoid =

Circulating auto-antibodies in the human body can target normal parts of the skin leading to disease. This is a list of antigens in the skin that may become targets of circulating auto-antibodies leading to the various types of pemphigoid.

Target antigens for the different pemphigoid variants
Pemphigoid variant	Antibody isotype	Antigen	Molecular weight (KDa)
Bullous pemphigoid	IgG, IgE	NC16A terminal of BPAG2; BPAG1	180; 230
Gestational pemphigoid	IgG1	NC16A terminal of BPAG2; BPAG1	180; 230
Cicatricial pemphigoid		C-terminal of BPAG2	180
Ocular cicatricial pemphigoid		Integrin beta-4 subunit	200
Antiepiligrin cicatricial pemphigoid (Note: The antiepiligrin variant of cicatricial pemphigoid is associated with gastric cancer.)		Laminin 5 (Epiligrin, Laminin 332)	
Linear IgA bullous dermatosis		LAD1 portion of BPAG2; Collagen type VII	97; 290/145
Protein 105 pemphigoid		Protein in lower lamina lucida	105

Of note, there are also several other diseases that are caused by auto-antibodies that target the same anatomic area of the skin which is termed the basement membrane zone. These diseases include:

Target antigens for the different autoimmune bullous conditions targeting the basement membrane zone of the human integumentary system, excluding pemphigoid
Disease	Antibody isotype	Antigen	Molecular weight (KDa)
Epidermolysis bullosa acquisita		Collagen type VII	290/145
Bullous lupus erythematosus		Collagen type VII	290/145
Lichen planus pemphigoides (Note: In this condition bullae develop on skin already affected by lesions of lichen planus as well as on areas of skin without lesions of lichen planus.)		BPAG2	180

== See also ==
- List of target antigens in pemphigus
- List of immunofluorescence findings for autoimmune bullous conditions
- List of cutaneous conditions
- List of genes mutated in cutaneous conditions
- List of histologic stains that aid in diagnosis of cutaneous conditions
