= Bullous pemphigoid =

Autoimmune disease of skin and connective tissue characterized by large blisters

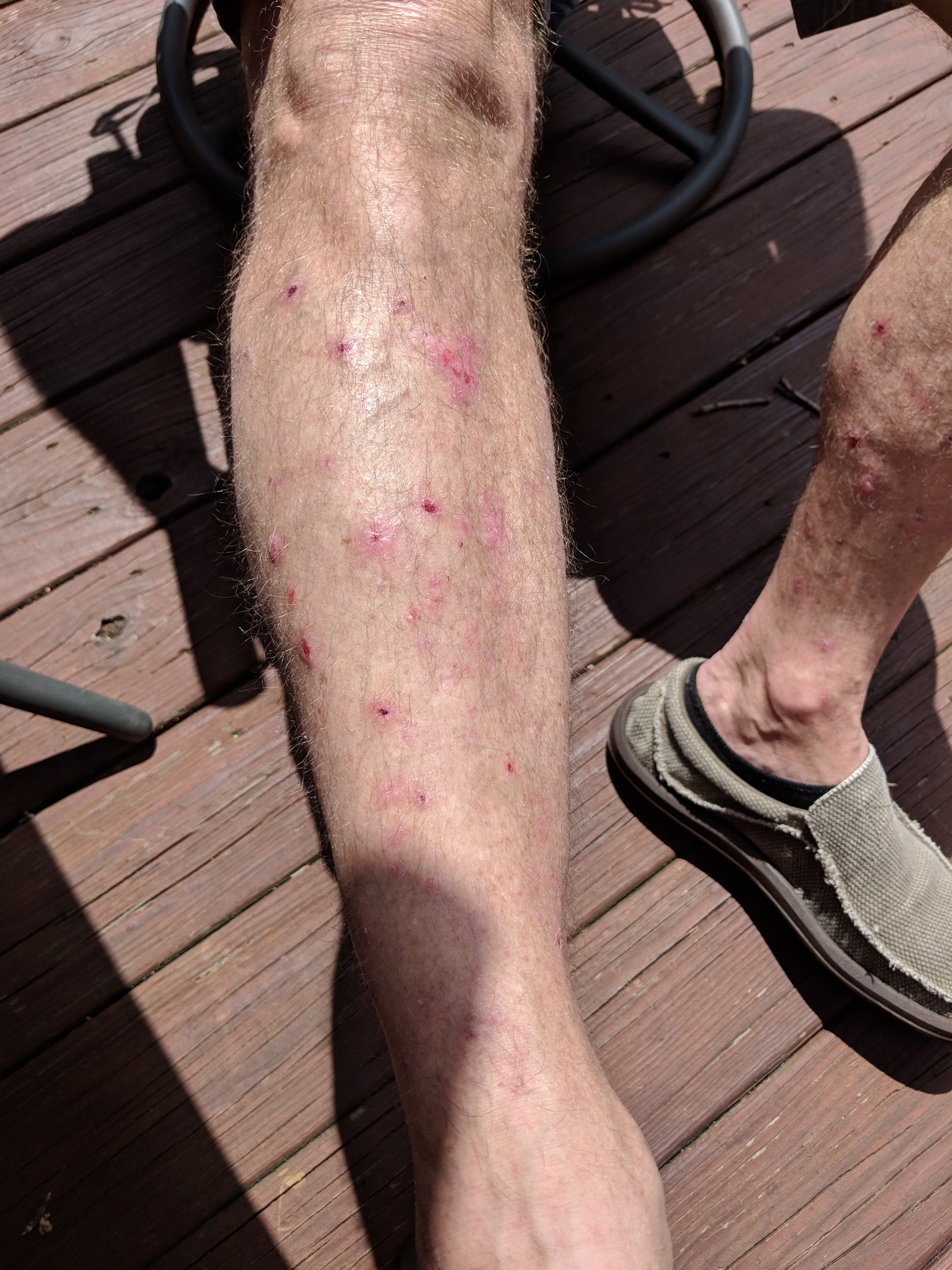
- A patient present with legs covered in popped blisters caused by bullous pemphigoid. The blisters cover his entire body.
- Specialty: Dermatology

Bullous pemphigoid (a type of pemphigoid) is an autoimmune pruritic skin disease that typically occurs in people aged over 60, that may involve the formation of blisters (bullae) in the space between the epidermal and dermal skin layers. It is classified as a type II hypersensitivity reaction, which involves the formation of anti-hemidesmosome antibodies, causing a loss of keratinocytes to basement membrane adhesion.

== Signs and symptoms ==
Clinically, the earliest lesions may appear as a hives-like red raised rash, but could also appear dermatitic, targetoid, lichenoid, nodular, or even without a rash (essential pruritus). Bullous pemphigoid is characterized by the subepidermal blisters resulting in tense and less fragile bullae. Tense bullae eventually erupt, most commonly at the inner thighs and upper arms, but the trunk and extremities are frequently both involved. Any part of the skin surface can be involved. Oral lesions are present in a minority of cases. The disease may be acute, but can last from months to years with periods of exacerbation and remission.

Several other skin diseases may have similar symptoms. However, milia are more common with epidermolysis bullosa acquisita, because of the deeper antigenic targets. A more ring-like configuration with a central depression or centrally collapsed bullae may indicate linear IgA disease. Nikolsky's sign is negative, unlike pemphigus vulgaris, where it is positive.

== Causes ==
In most cases of bullous pemphigoid, no clear precipitating factors are identified. Potential precipitating events that have been reported include exposure to ultraviolet light and radiation therapy. Onset of pemphigoid has also been associated with certain drugs, including furosemide, nonsteroidal anti-inflammatory agents, DPP-4 inhibitors, captopril, penicillamine, and antibiotics.

== Pathophysiology ==
The bullae are formed by an immune reaction, initiated by the formation of IgG autoantibodies targeting dystonin, also called bullous pemphigoid antigen 1, and/or type XVII collagen, also called bullous pemphigoid antigen 2, which is a component of hemidesmosomes. A different form of dystonin is associated with neuropathy. Following antibody targeting, a cascade of immunomodulators results in a variable surge of immune cells, including neutrophils, lymphocytes, and eosinophils coming to the affected area. Unclear events subsequently result in a separation along the dermoepidermal junction and eventually stretch bullae.

Bullous pemphigoid goes through two distinct phases: The non-bullous and the bullous phase.

Non-bullous phase involves mild to severe intractable pruritic skin due to the non-specificity of the disease. involving eczematous or urticarial lesions. This phase of Bullous pemphigoid can occur over a time period of weeks to months. In the bullous phase, tense blisters form in an annular shape and are filled with clear fluid. This occurs on the abdomen, limbs, and lower trunk. These blisters average between 1 cm and 4 cm in diameter.

== Diagnosis ==
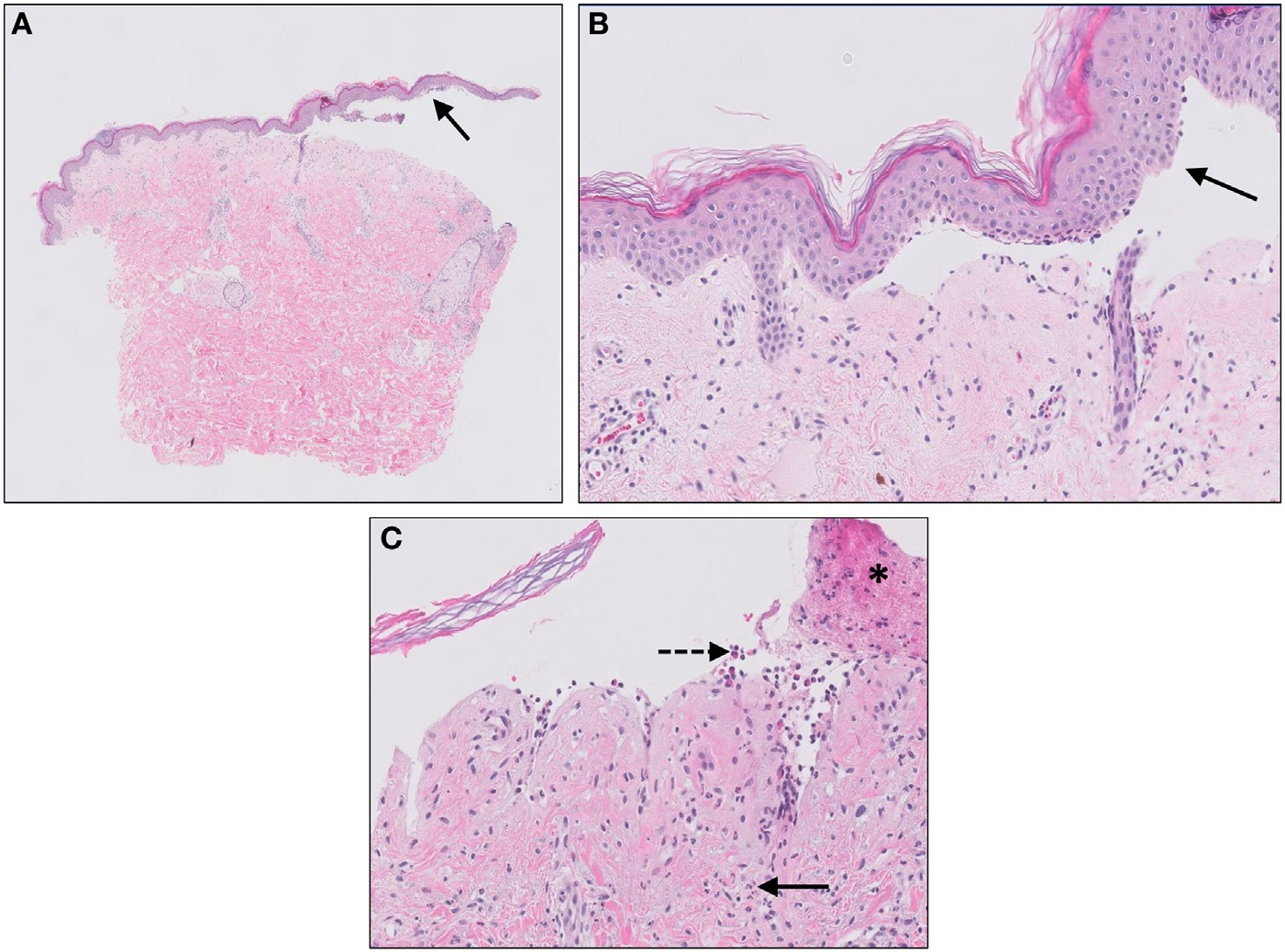
Micrograph of bullous pemphigoid. Subepidermal blistering [solid arrows in (A, B)] and influx of inflammatory cells, including eosinophils and neutrophils in the dermis [solid arrow (C)] and blister cavity [dashed arrows (C)]. In (C), deposition of fibrin is also noted (asterisks).

Diagnosis consist of at least 2 positive results out of 3 criteria (2-out-of-3 rule): (1) pruritus and/or predominant cutaneous blisters, (2) linear IgG and/or C3c deposits (in an n- serrated pattern) by direct immunofluorescence microscopy (DIF) on a skin biopsy specimen, and (3) positive epidermal side staining by indirect immunofluorescence microscopy on human salt-split skin (IIF SSS) on a serum sample. Routine H&E staining or ELISA tests do not add value to initial diagnosis.

In the early stages Bullous pemphigoid, particularly in rare forms of the disease, it can be misdiagnosed as the lesions may appear more like prurigo simplex subacuta, chronic prurigo, eczema, urticaria and localized.

== Treatment ==
Treatments include topical steroids such as clobetasol, and halobetasol, which in some studies have proven to be equally effective as systemic, or pill, therapy and somewhat safer. However, in difficult-to-manage or widespread cases, systemic prednisone and powerful steroid-free immunosuppressant medications, such as methotrexate, azathioprine or mycophenolate mofetil, may be appropriate. Some of these medications have the potential for severe adverse effects such as kidney and liver damage, increased susceptibility to infections, and bone marrow suppression. Antibiotics such as tetracycline or erythromycin may also control the disease, particularly in patients who cannot use corticosteroids.

The anti-CD20 monoclonal antibody rituximab is effective in treating some otherwise refractory cases of pemphigoid. A 2010 (updated in 2023) meta-analysis of 14 randomized controlled trials showed that oral steroids and potent topical steroids are effective treatments, although their use may be limited by side-effects, while lower doses of topical steroids are safe and effective for treatment of moderate bullous pemphigoid.

IgA-mediated pemphigoid can often be difficult to treat even with usually effective medications such as rituximab.

== Prognosis ==
Bulbous pemphigoid may be self-resolving in a period ranging from several months to many years, even without treatment. Poor general health related to old age is associated with a poorer prognosis.

== Epidemiology ==
Very rarely seen in children, bullous and non-bullous pemphigoid most commonly occurs in people 70 years of age and older. Its estimated frequency is seven to 14 cases per million per year, but has been reported to be as high as 472 cases per million per year in Scottish men older than 85. At least one study indicates the incidence might be increasing in the United Kingdom. Some sources report it affects men twice as frequently as women, while others report no difference between the sexes.

Many mammals can be affected, including dogs, cats, pigs, and horses, as well as humans. It is very rare in dogs; on average, three cases are diagnosed around the world each year.

== Research ==
Animal models of bullous pemphigoid have been developed using transgenic techniques to produce mice lacking the genes for the two known autoantigens, dystonin and collagen XVII.

== See also ==
- Cicatricial pemphigoid
- Dystonin
- Gestational pemphigoid
- List of target antigens in pemphigoid
- List of immunofluorescence findings for autoimmune bullous conditions
