= Basal lamina =

Thin layer of extracellular matrix upon which epithelial cells reside

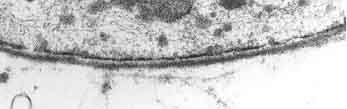
- Transmission electron micrograph displaying basal lamina that is lining the external surface of cell membrane.

Details

Identifiers
- Latin: lamina basalis
- TA98: A15.2.03.007; A15.2.03.019; A15.3.03.102
- TA2: 7032
- TH: H2.00.00.0.00006
- FMA: 62918

The basal lamina is a layer of extracellular matrix secreted by the epithelial cells, on which the epithelium sits. It is one of two layers of the basement membrane. The basal lamina is visible only with the electron microscope, where it appears as an electron-dense layer that is 20–100 nm thick. It is thicker in the alveoli of the lungs, and in the kidney glomeruli.

== Structure ==
The layers of the basal lamina ("BL") and those of the basement membrane ("BM") are described below:

Name	Part of BL?	Part of BM?	Notes
lamina lucida / lamina rara	yes	yes	electron-lucid layer containing the glycoprotein laminin
lamina densa	yes	yes	electron-dense layer composed of type IV collagen
lamina reticularis	no	yes	The three above layers of the basal lamina typically sit on top of the reticular lamina, which is synthesized by cells from the underlying connective tissue and contains fibronectin. The exception is when two epithelial layers abut one another as in the alveoli of the lungs and glomeruli of the kidneys, in which the basal lamina of one epithelial layer fuses with that of the other.

Anchoring fibrils composed of type VII collagen extend from the basal lamina into the underlying reticular lamina and loop around collagen bundles. Although found beneath all basal laminae, they are especially numerous in stratified squamous cells of the skin.

These layers should not be confused with the lamina propria, which is found outside the basal lamina.

=== Basement membrane ===
The basement membrane is visible under light microscopy. Electron microscopy shows that the basement membrane consists of three layers: the lamina lucida (electron-lucent), lamina densa (electron-dense), and lamina fibro-reticularis (electron-lucent).

The lamina densa was formerly called the “basal lamina”. The terms “basal lamina” and “basement membrane” were often used interchangeably, until it was realised that all three layers seen with the electron microscope constituted the single layer seen with the light microscope. This has led to considerable terminological confusion; if used, the term “basal lamina” should be confined to its meaning as lamina densa.

Some theorize that the lamina lucida is an artifact created when preparing the tissue, and that the lamina lucida is therefore equal to the lamina densa in vivo.

The term "basal lamina" is usually used with electron microscopy, while the term "basement membrane" is usually used with light microscopy.

Examples of basement membranes include:

- Basilar membrane
- Bruch's membrane
- Descemet's membrane
- Glomerular basement membrane

The glomerular basement membrane is a special case, consisting of a fusion of the podocyte and endothelial basal laminas, and lacking a lamina reticularis. Thus, it consists of an especially thick lamina densa, sandwiched on its inside and outside by layers of lamina lucida / rara (one from each cell type). These two enveloping layers are often referred to as lamina rara externa and lamina rara interna.

== Function ==
The basal lamina is made and maintained by the cells that sit on it. It acts as a point of attachment for cells. However, it can also have other function such as a permeability barrier in the glomerulus (urine production). Some of the matrix molecules (of the basal lamina) mediate synaptic adhesion in neuromuscular synapses.

Alport syndrome is a genetic disorder resulting from mutations in the COL4A3/4/5 genes. These genes are important in collagen IV synthesis and basement membrane formation. In individuals with this syndrome the basement membrane in structures such as the glomerulus, ears, and eyes does not function properly, causing symptoms such as blood in the urine, loss of hearing, and vision problems.

== See also ==
- Alveolar-capillary barrier
- Basolateral membrane
- Collagen
- Glomerular basement membrane
- Lamina propria
- Reticular lamina
