= Pemphigoid =

Autoimmune blistering diseases

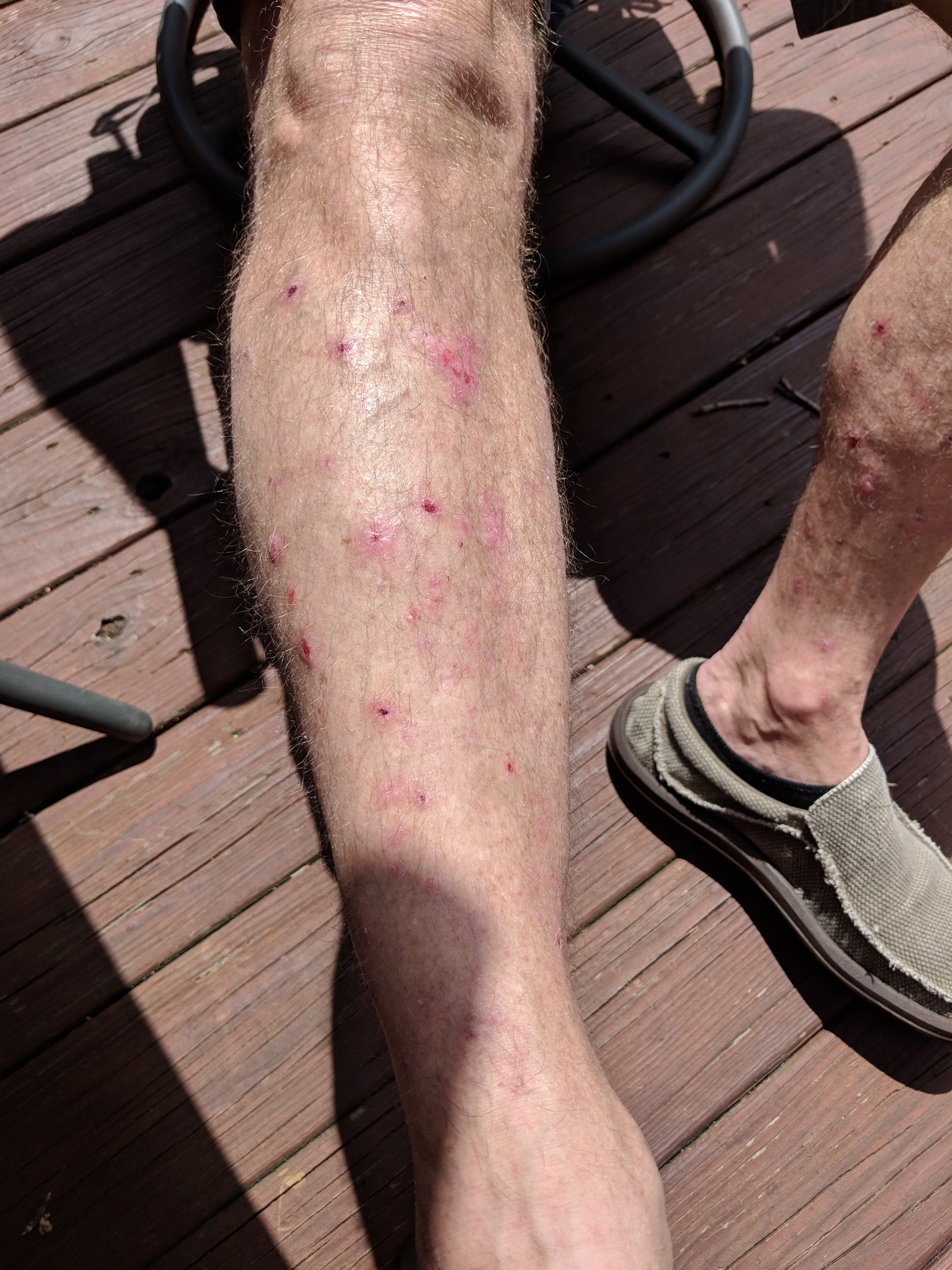
- Vesicles and bullae shown on the lower leg, some ruptured leaving a crusted area in bullous pemphigoid
- Specialty: Dermatology

Pemphigoid is a group of rare autoimmune blistering diseases of the skin and mucous membranes. As its name indicates, pemphigoid is similar in general appearance to pemphigus, however unlike pemphigus, pemphigoid does not feature acantholysis, a loss of connections between skin cells.

Pemphigoid is more common than pemphigus and is slightly more common in women than in men. It is also more common in people older than 70 than it is in younger people.

== Classification ==
The forms of pemphigoid are considered to be connective tissue autoimmune skin diseases. There are several types:

- Gestational pemphigoid (PG); formerly called Herpes gestationis
- Bullous pemphigoid (BP)
- Mucous membrane pemphigoid (MMP); also called cicatricial pemphigoid

Bullous and mucous membrane pemphigoid usually affect persons who are over age 60. Gestational pemphigoid occurs during pregnancy, typically in the second or third trimester, or immediately following pregnancy.

Pemphigoid is usually considered to be mediated by IgG, but IgA-mediated forms have also been described.

IgA-mediated immunobullous diseases can often be difficult to treat even with usually effective medications such as rituximab.

== Bullous pemphigoid ==
Bullous pemphigoid (BP) is a rare and chronic autoimmune disorder characterised by large sub-epidermal blisters called bullae that predominantly involves the skin and less commonly the mucous membranes. It is the most common type of the pemphigoid group, representing 80% of sub-epidermal immunobullous cases. It is more commonly known as cutaneous pemphigoid.

=== Presentation ===
Primary lesions of small and large blisters, known as vesicles and bullae, are found on the skin and sometimes on the mucous membranes.

==== Non-bullous pemphigoid ====
In some patients, pemphigoid starts off with cutaneous manifestations of bullous pemphigoid without bullae, as the only sign of the disease. Pruritic eczematous, papular, or urticaria-like skin lesions may also persist for weeks to months.

==== Bullous phase ====
The bullous stage of BP shows vesicles and bulla, appearing on apparently normal or erythematous skin, predominantly at the flexural aspects of the extremities and the lower trunk. Mucosal lesions, which typically are erosions of the oral mucosa, are present in 10 to 30 percent of patients. Occasionally, the blister fluid becomes blood-tinged. The blisters are tense, about 1–4 cm in diameter, leaving eroded and crusted areas, together with urticarial and infiltrated papules and plaques in an annular or figurate pattern.

Homology between bullous pemphigoid antigens in the skin and neuronal antigens in the central nervous system has been proposed as a cause for the observed link between bullous pemphigoid and neurologic disease; this could be explained by an underlying genetic predisposition. Patients with bullous pemphigoid usually present with two or more other chronic diseases such as neurological disorders (dementia, Parkinson's disease, or stroke). However, further studies are necessary to explore the relationship between these disorders.

=== Cause ===
The pathogenetic mechanism of blister formation is known; the trigger to the formation of the antibodies to the hemidesmosome antigens is still unknown. Most bullous pemphigoid cases are due to autoantibodies (mostly IgG) directed at antigens (BP180 and BP230) arranged at the dermal-epidermal junction. However, most commonly, drugs can be one of the causes of bullous pemphigoid, such as thiazide diuretics, antibiotics (e.g., penicillins, vancomycin), nonsteroidal anti-inflammatory drugs (NSAIDs) and angiotensin-converting enzyme (ACE) inhibitors (e.g., captopril) and possibly angiotensin receptor blockers (ARBs, e.g., valsartan).

The implicated drugs include:

- Penicillin derivatives
- Sulfasalazine
- Ibuprofen
- Phenacetin
- Enalapril
- Captopril
- Lisinopril
- Gabapentin
- Novoscabin
- Levobunolol ophthalmic solution
- DPT vaccine
- Influenza, tetanus, and other vaccinations. Influenza vaccination does not appear to be an important trigger for bullous pemphigoid.
- Homeopathy regimen
- Nifedipine
- 5-aminosalicylic acid
- Doxazosin
- Serratiopeptidase
- Losartan
- Cephalexin
- Bumetanide
- Fluoxetine
- Chloroquine
- Antipsychotic drugs (neuroleptics)
- Enoxaparin
- Ciprofloxacin
- Furosemide (frusemide)
- Penicillamine
- Gliptin plus metformin
- Intravenous iodine
- Etanercept
- Levofloxacin
- Topical fluorouracil

Trauma, burns, lymphedema, phototherapy, and radiation have been implicated in a very small number of cases.

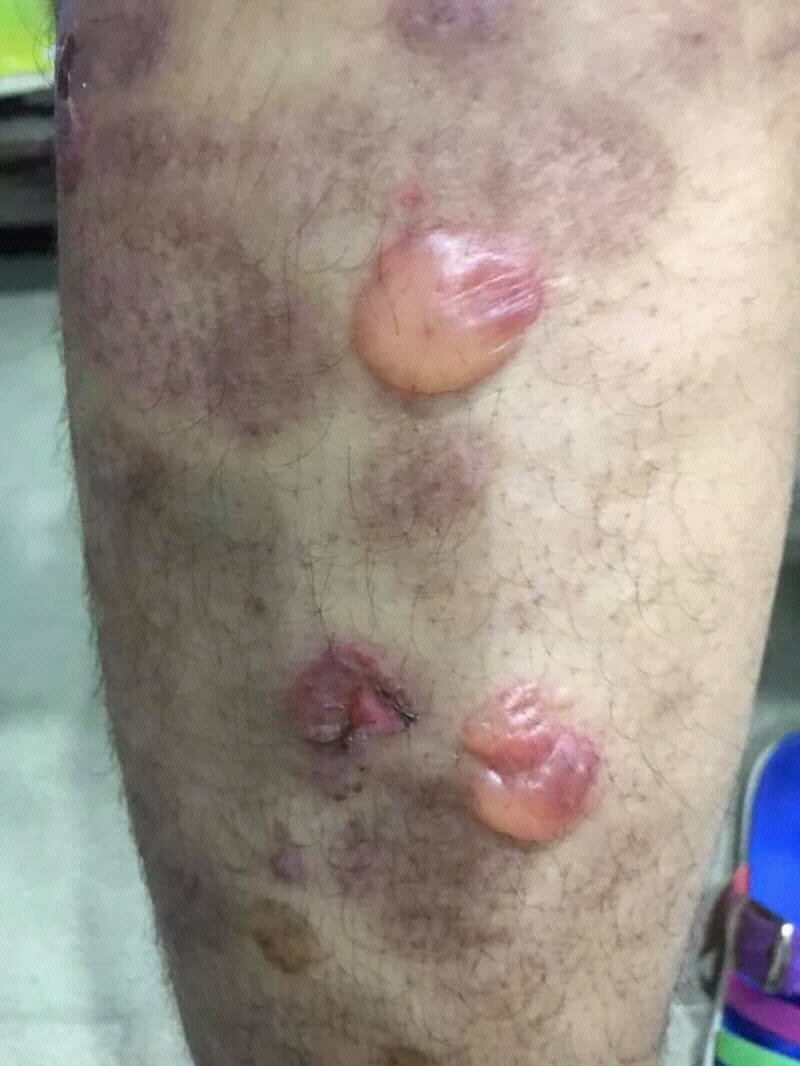
The blisters are tense, about 1‑4 cm in diameter, leaving eroded and crusted areas.

=== Pathophysiology ===
The pathophysiology of bullous pemphigoid consists of two major components: immunologic and inflammatory. In the immunologic component, autoantibodies act against the hemidesmosomal bullous pemphigoid antigens BP230 (BPAg1) and BP180 (BPAg2 or type XVII collagen), located in the lamina lucida of the basement membrane zone. These antigens play an important role in the adhesion complexes that promote epithelial-stromal adhesion. The predominant subclass of antibodies that acts against the antigens is IgG4. IgG1 and IgG2 antibodies are less frequently detected compared to IgG4 antibodies, while IgG3 antibodies are usually absent. When the autoantibodies bind specifically to the target antigens, the complement system and mast cells are activated, representing the inflammatory component. Inflammatory cells such as neutrophils and eosinophils are then attracted to the affected area. They are postulated to release proteolytic enzymes which degrade the hemidesmosomal proteins, resulting in blister formation.

Other potential contributory factors including genetic factors, environmental exposures to infections and drugs as well as the phenomenon of epitope spreading are also known to cause bullous pemphigoid.

=== Diagnosis ===
Diagnosis of bullous pemphigoid includes clinical assessment, skin biopsy for histopathology and direct immunofluorescence, indirect immunofluorescence and the ELISA test. Among all, direct immunofluorescence is the gold standard for diagnosis of bullous pemphigoid.

==== Clinical assessment ====
For patients greater than 70 years old

- Blistering skin disease characterized by the presence of tense blisters and erosions that occur without another identifiable cause and rarely on mucosa.
- Unexplained pruritus, pruritic eczematous eruptions, or urticarial plaques

==== Histopathology ====
Lesional tissue, preferably of an intact vesicle or the edge of an intact bulla is obtained using punch biopsy for Haemotoxylin and Eosin (H&E) staining.

Typical histopathologic findings include:

- Sub-epidermal split with numerous eosinophils within the cleft.
- A superficial dermal inflammatory cell infiltration of variable intensity with lymphocytes, eosinophils, and neutrophils.
- Eosinophilic spongiosis (specifically in early lesions or may be seen in clinically erythematous skin surrounding the blister)

==== Direct immunofluorescence ====
Direct immunofluorescence (DIF) studies involves directly detecting tissue bound antibodies. Biopsy specimens for DIF should be taken from perilesional skin instead of lesional skin for H&E histopathologic evaluation. DIF specimens should be placed in Michel's solution or Zeuss transport media instead of formalin.

DIF of bullous pemphigoid will show the presence of fine, continuous and linear deposits of IgG and/or C3 along the epidermal basement membrane. Other classes of immunoglobulins such as IgM and IgA are present in approximately 20% of cases and usually are less intense. In some cases with the deposits of IgA, patient may have oral lesion. At early stages of the disease, only C3 may be present.

==== Indirect immunofluorescence ====
Indirect immunofluorescence is used to detect circulating antibodies targeting the antigens at the basement membrane zone in patients with pemphigoid. In this procedure, patient's serum is collected and overlaid on salt-split normal human skin and incubated. Following this, the specimen will be stained for fluorescent detection of antibodies.

In bullous pemphigoid, circulating IgG targeting the basement membrane, mainly BP180 and BP230 hemidesmosomal proteins are detectable in 60-80% of patients. IgA and IgE classes can also be detected, but less frequently.

==== Enzyme-linked immunosorbent assay (ELISA) ====
ELISA for bullous pemphigoid are commercially available to test for circulating Ig against NC16A domain of BP180 and BP230, known as bullous pemphigoid antigen 2 [BPAg2] and bullous pemphigoid antigen 1 [BPAg1] respectively. Antibodies to BP180NC16A domain is useful for the diagnosis of bullous pemphigoid as it has a sensitivity of 89% and specificity of 98%.

Detection of BP180 and/or BP230 antibodies in serum does not give a confirmative diagnosis of bullous pemphigoid. A study has reported that 7% were tested positive for one or both autoantibodies in one series of 337 people without bullous pemphigoid. ELISA findings should be correlated with DIF to reduce the risk of misdiagnosis.

=== Treatment ===
1. Corticosteroids
  1. Topical corticosteroids
  2. Systemic corticosteroids
2. Glucocorticoid-sparing drugs
  1. Immunosuppressive drugs
  2. Anti-inflammatory drugs
3. Biologic therapy
  1. Intravenous immunoglobulin
  2. Rituximab

Among all, topical or systemic corticosteroids are considered as the first line therapy in controlling bullous pemphigoid. Other drugs and immunomodulatory therapies are often used as adjunct to minimize the adverse effect of long term use of corticosteroids and improve the healing of the disease.

There are several factors that have to be taken into account when choosing the therapies given to the patient: (a) patient's age (b) underlying disease such as hypertension, diabetes mellitus and other cardiovascular disease (c) side effect with the use of drugs (d) patient's ability to compliant to the therapy (d) severity and extent of disease (e) cost of drugs.

==== Corticosteroids ====
High potency topical corticosteroid is preferred as the first line treatment due to its efficacy and fewer systemic adverse effects when compared to systemic corticosteroids. Studies have shown that patients with extensive bullous pemphigoid (defined as >10 new bullae per day) treated with topical corticosteroids (Topical Clobetasol Propionate 0.05% cream) had better clinical outcomes than patients with extensive bullae pemphigoid who were treated with systemic glucocorticoid therapy (Prednisone).

Systemic glucocorticoids can be used for patients when there are factors that make the use of topical corticosteroids not feasible, such as elderly patient inability to apply the cream on their own, cost or patient's own preference.

===== Topical corticosteroids =====
Topical Clobetasol Propionate 0.05% cream is usually used and applied twice daily. A study by Joly et al. demonstrated that the use of 10 to 20g of Clobetasol Propionate per day for moderate disease and 20 to 30g per day for extensive disease until 15 days after disease control, then tapered to discontinuation over four months was as effective as the standard regime (40g per day tapered slowly over 12 months).

===== Systemic corticosteroids =====
Prednisone is usually used to treat bullous pemphigoid. The dose varies between 0.2 and 0.5 mg/kg/day and will continue until active inflammation, new blister formation, pruritus has stopped for at least 2 weeks. The dose is then slowly tapered over the months. Initially, prednisolone can be reduced by relative large amounts (approximately 10 mg) and smaller amount (2.5–5 mg) subsequently. Should the patient develop flare up of the lesion, the dose should be increased to the previous level or higher and maintained longer before further, slower tapering.

==== Glucocorticoid sparing drugs ====
For patients who require high dose of corticosteroids for clearing or maintenance, glucocorticoid sparing agents such as immunosuppressive drugs and anti-inflammatory drugs can be used as an adjunct therapy to reduce the systemic side effects of corticosteroids. Patients who have comorbidities and contraindications for corticosteroids may also consider these glucocorticoid sparing agents.

===== Immunosuppressant drug =====
Immunosuppressant drugs include azathioprine (1–3 mg/kg/day in two equally divided doses), mycophenolate mofetil (1000–3000 mg/day or 40 mg/kg/day in two divided doses), and methotrexate (10–15 mg/week).

===== Anti-inflammatory drugs =====
Tetracycline antibiotics are often used in combination of nicotinamide to treat bullous pemphigoid. For the administration of drugs, tetracycline is prescribed as 500 mg four times daily, doxycycline and minocycline as 100 mg twice daily and nicotinamide, 500 mg 4 times daily. Dapsone is also shown to be effective in treating bullous pemphigoid. However, the efficacy of dapsone is limited. Dapsone is usually commenced at a low dose of 25 to 50 mg/day and increase by 25 mg every week until the condition improves. Maximum dose that can be prescribed is 250 mg/day.

===== Biologic therapy =====
For refractory disease, biologic therapies such as intravenous immunoglobulin and Rituximab should be considered. [1,19,20]

=== Epidemiology ===
Bullous pemphigoid is primarily a disease of older adults and it rarely occurs in children. The vast majority of cases involved individuals between the ages of 60 and 80 years. Two European studies have also suggested the increased risk of bullous pemphigoid with advancing age.

According to the results of several retrospective studies, there is an increasing incidence of bullous pemphigoid. Bullous pemphigoid can be considered as the most common autoimmune blistering disease in Europe, while pemphigus may be more common in locations such as Thailand and Malaysia. It is reported that bullous pemphigoid has a slight female preponderance. However, the reasons for this are unknown.

== Mucous membrane pemphigoid ==
Mucous membrane pemphigoid (MMP), or cicatricial pemphigoid, is a rare, chronic, autoimmune sub-epidermal blistering disorder which predominantly involves the mucosae and has a tendency towards scarring of the affected areas. Any mucous membrane can be involved, but the most commonly involved site is the oral mucosa, followed by conjunctiva, skin, pharynx, external genitalia, nasal mucosa, larynx, anus, and esophagus. As MMP may lead to serious complications such as blindness and airway compression, early and aggressive treatment initiation may be needed.

=== Presentation ===
Scarring is a common consequence of MMP that distinguishes this variant from mucosal involvement in bullous pemphigoid, which typically does not scar. Reticulated, white striations representing mucosal fibrosis often are present at sites of healed lesions, and functional limitations secondary to scarring may occur. As examples, MMP involving the ocular mucosa can lead to symblepharon, ankyloblepharon, and eventual blindness, and progressive laryngeal and tracheal involvement can result in asphyxiation.

==== Oral disease ====
Most commonly affecting the mouth, including the buccal mucosa, gingiva, tongue, vermillion lips, and palate. Desquamative gingivitis is the most frequent manifestation. The gingiva is erythematous, in which patients usually complaint of bleeding upon brushing. Rupturing of oral vesiculobullous lesions leave clean, noninflamed, painless erosions. The vermilion border of the lips is spared, which is typical in pemphigus. Hoarseness due to laryngeal involvement can be seen in 8% of cases. A subset of patients have only oral disease, which has a relatively benign course compared with patients with oral cavity and other mucosae and skin involvement.

==== Ocular disease ====
The eye is involved in 65% of cases. Initially presented with unilateral conjunctivitis (such as burning or excessive tearing), then fibrosis beneath the conjunctival epithelium. Shrinkage of the conjunctiva leads to obliteration of the conjunctival sac. Symblepharons are fibrous strands connecting the conjunctiva of the lid to the globe. Besides, reduced tearing with erosion and neovascularization of the cornea leads to corneal opacification and perforation. Scarring of the lid results in entropion (inward turning of the lid) and trichiasis (in-turning of the eyelashes). These conditions ultimately lead to blindness in approximately 20% of cases. It is crucial to go for follow-up because relapse occurs in 22% of those who were in remission and not undergoing therapy.

==== Other mucous membranes ====
Less common sites that might get involved are nasopharynx, esophagus, and urethra. Nasopharyngeal involvement can lead to ulcerations of the septum and airway obstruction which might require tracheostomy. Esophageal disease may present with ulcerations, dysphagia, odynophagia, and stenosis. Stenosis at urethra, vaginal orifice and rectal have also resulted from chronic inflammation and scarring.

==== Skin disease ====
About 25% of patients have cutaneous lesions, with tense vesicles or bullae, mainly on the face, neck, and scalp. Healing of erosion is either with or without atrophic scars. Cutaneous lesions of mucous membrane pemphigoid presents in 2 subtypes: (1)presents as generalized eruption of tense bullae without scarring (2) presents as localised blisters on an erythematous base, resulting in atrophic scarring.

==== Mucous membrane pemphigoid is also associated with malignancy ====
Malignancy — MMP with antibodies directed against laminin 332 (previously known as laminin 5 and epiligrin) has been associated with an increased risk for internal malignancy. In a cohort of 35 patients with this type of pemphigoid (diagnosed with immunoprecipitation), 10 (29 percent) developed solid organ malignancies, 7 of which were diagnosed within 14 months after a diagnosis of MMP. Occurrences of non-Hodgkin lymphoma and cutaneous T cell lymphoma have also been reported in individual patients with anti-laminin 332 MMP. The pathophysiologic relationship of this subtype of MMP to cancer is unknown. However, expression of laminin 332 has been detected in malignant cells, and laminin 332 appears to be capable of promoting tumor cell growth, invasion, and metastasis.

The clinical manifestations of MMP in patients with laminin 332 antibodies are similar to the features of MMP with other antibody profiles. Therefore, clinical examination cannot reliably distinguish anti-laminin 332 MMP from other forms of MMP. Additional studies are necessary to confirm the findings of a retrospective study of 154 patients with MPP that associated the detection of laminin 332 antibodies via a novel enzyme-linked immunosorbent assay (ELISA) with a greater likelihood for severe disease.

Since diagnostic laboratory testing for laminin 332 antibodies is not commercially available, suspicion for laminin 332 primarily is based upon immunofluorescence microscopy findings. Although not exclusive to laminin 332 MPP, the detection of antibodies bound to the dermal side of basement membrane zone-split (salt-split) skin suggests the possibility of this diagnosis.

Until definitive testing for laminin 332 antibodies becomes available, we recommend that patients with MMP in whom serum indirect immunofluorescence (IIF) studies reveal antibodies bound to the dermal side of basement membrane zone-split skin undergo age and gender appropriate cancer screening. Additional evaluation for malignancy should be performed as indicated based upon a review of symptoms, physical examination, and the results of age-appropriate screening.

=== Cause ===
Autoantibodies targeted to components of the basement membrane zone have been identified as pathogenic in mucous membrane pemphigoid. Antigens include 180-kD bullous pemphigoid antigen (BP180), laminin 332, beta-4-integrin, and other antigens that are not fully discovered are identified against the basement membrane. Complication of D- penicillamine therapy may trigger and causes mucous membrane pemphigoid. It also occurs after acute severe ocular inflammation in patients with Stevens-Johnson syndrome.

=== Pathophysiology ===
Autoantibodies target the basement membrane zone proteins which are responsible to promote adhesion within the basement membrane zone of the mucosa and the skin. The major basement membrane zone proteins identified include :

- C-terminus of BP180
- BP230
- Laminin 332(also known as laminin 5 or epiligrin)
- Alpha-6-beta-4 integrin Type VII collagen.

In contrast to the target of the N-terminus of BP180 that is located in the hemidesmosomes and upper lamina lucida in bullous pemphigoid, the target antigen in MMP is the C-terminus of BP180 which is located in the lower lamina lucida and lamina densa. This results in a deeper separation that is more likely to scar as compared to a more superficial blister that is unlikely to scar in bullous pemphigoid.

Antibodies to the beta-4 integrin subunit of alpha-6-beta-4 integrin is shown to be associated with ocular disease while oral involvement is suggested to be linked with antibody reaction towards the alpha-6 subunit. Besides, MMP with antibody reaction against laminin 332 has an association with an increased risk for internal malignancy.

Similar to bullous pemphigoid, other factors such as genetic factors, environmental exposures and the phenomenon of epitope spreading potentially result in MMP. Multiple studies have also reported an association of HLA-DQB1*0301 with MPP.

=== Diagnosis ===
Diagnosis of bullous pemphigoid includes clinical assessment, skin biopsy for histopathology and direct immunofluorescence, indirect immunofluorescence and ELISA test. Among all, direct immunofluorescence is the gold standard for diagnosis of mucous membrane pemphigoid.

==== Clinical assessment ====
- Presence of tense blisters and erosions that occur on skin without another identifiable cause.
- Desquamative gingivitis or mucositis involving oral, ocular, nasal, genital, anal, pharyngeal, laryngeal, and/or esophageal mucosae
- Presence of pruritic eczematous eruptions, or urticarial plaques without identifiable cause.
- Patient's age over 60 years old.

==== Histopathology ====
Lesional tissue, preferably of an intact vesicle or the edge of an intact bulla is obtained using punch biopsy for Haemotoxylin and Eosin (H&E) staining.

The findings are sub-epidermal blister with dermal infiltrated with lymphocytes, neutrophils and eosinophils. Additional findings include sub-epidermal fibrosis which is consistent with the scarring nature of mucous membrane pemphigoid in older lesions and plasma cell infiltration.

==== Direct immunofluorescence studies ====
Direct immunofluorescence (DIF) studies involves directly detecting tissue bound antibodies. Biopsy specimens for DIF should be taken from perilesional skin instead of lesional skin for H&E histopathologic evaluation. Linear band of IgG and C3 deposits are found along the basement membrane. Occasionally, linear deposition of IgA at the basement membrane zone can also be seen. Multiple and repeated biopsies increase the sensitivity of DIF studies to diagnose MMP.

==== Indirect immunofluorescence ====
Indirect immunofluorescence is used to detect circulating antibodies targeting the antigens at the basement membrane zone in patients with pemphigoid. In early studies using routine techniques, only one third of patient with MPP were being tested positive. Circulating IgG and IgA antibodies are found in patient's serum. To increase the likelihood of detecting circulating antibodies, human basement membrane zone-split skin and/or concentrated serum should be used.

==== Antigen-specific serologic testing ====
Autoantibodies directed against a variety of antigens, including BP180, BP230, laminin 332, and type VII collagen may be detected. However, this test could not be used as the only diagnostic tool for testing as ELISA testing has limited sensitivity.

=== Treatment ===
The factors that determine the type of therapy used for mucous membrane pemphigoid are: [1] site(s) of involvement, [2] severity of disease, [3] rate of progression.

Oral mucosa is the most common site being affected in mucous membrane pemphigoid.

For the mild oral mucosa lesion, high potency topical steroids such as 0.05% Clobetasol propionate is used. Patients are instructed to apply the ointment or gel 2-3 times a day after drying the oral mucosa to enhance the adherence of mediation to oral mucosa. Patients are instructed to avoid drinking or eating for at least 30 minutes after application. Dental tray can also be fabricated to help in the application of topical steroids to lesional sites under occlusion for patients with gingival involvement. Furthermore, topical tacrolimus, a calcineurin inhibitor, has also shown to be effective to control the disease, including some patients who failed to respond well to topical corticosteroids. Topical tacrolimus 0.1% ointment is applied two to three times a day and tapered after improvement in healing of pemphigoid. Another method is to use intralesional corticosteroids (Triamcinolone acetonide, dilution of 5 to 10 mg/ml; repeated every 2–4 weeks). Intralesional therapy is used when the patient does not respond to local therapies.

For moderate to severe disease (including the ones involving ocular, nasopharyngeal, or anogenital mucosa) and patient who did not respond to local therapy adequately, systemic agents should be used. Systemic corticosteroids and dapsone are used in such cases. The dose of dapsone ranges from 50 to 200 mg daily. Dapsone is shown to be effective in treating mucous membrane pemphigoid that does not respond to systemic corticosteroids. Whereas for systemic corticosteroids, 0.25 to 0.5 mg/kg of prednisolone is prescribed per day (twice-daily dosage is used during the acute stage and change to a single daily morning dose after new blister formation stops). Thereafter, the dosage of prednisolone is slowly tapered over the months in combination with topical therapy or glucocorticoid-sparing agent (e.g., dapsone, azathioprine).

Patients with severe mucous membrane pemphigoid that cannot be controlled by the intervention above and would need aggressive immunosuppressive regimens and biologic therapies to control the lesions. Azathioprine or Cyclosphosphamide are the choices of immunosuppressive drugs that can be used. Sometimes, immunosuppressive agents and prednisolone can be combined if dapsone fails to improve the condition. Lastly, in patients who do not respond to the conventional therapy, rituximab may be an option.

There is insufficient evidence that cyclophosphamide combined with corticosteriods are effective in treating mucous membrane pemphigoid.

Other than that, oral hygiene instructions should be given to patients as oral care is a critical part in treating mucous membrane pemphigoid. Before meals, patients are advised to rinse with hydrogen peroxide (diluted with water to a concentration of 1:4 or 1:6) and diphenhydramine to reduce the pain. Patient would then rinse with hydrogen peroxide to remove food particles and debris and later rinse with dexamethasone for anti-inflammatory effect. Hydrogen peroxide, elixir of dexamethasone and elixir of diphenhydramine are each diluted with water to a concentration of 1:4 or 1:6 and are instructed not to swallow in the end.

=== Epidemiology ===
MMP mainly affect the elderly population of ages between 60 and 80 years and rarely children. Women are affected twice as frequently than in men. There is no known racial or geographic predilection, but several studies have suggested that there is an association of specific immunogenetic haplotype HLA-DQB1*0301 with MMP.

== See also ==
- List of cutaneous conditions
- List of target antigens in pemphigoid
