= Alpha collagen =

Alpha collagen is specifically designed to deliver specific ratios of α- chain peptides as building blocks. The targeted cells can process the α- chain peptides to form triple helix collagen, and replenish the collagen in the targeted site. Scientists believe that Alpha collagen can help to deliver specific ratios of peptides to benefit the targeted cells.

Alpha collagen is designed to be used as a supplement for osteoarthritis, based on the theory of the different environments of the extracellular matrix (ECM). The ECM of joint cartilage comprises many classes of macromolecules; collagen (type I, II, VI, X collagen fibrils) and proteoglycans. The ratio and the proportion of collagen play an important role in the tensile and compressive strength, as well as the elasticity of the tissue. The content of collagen in cartilage is different between joints and soft tissue structures. For example, cartilage in the knee has a different structure to the ankle. Cartilage, skin, and spinal discs are subject to continuous regeneration during which anabolic and catabolic processes are in equilibrium. Any imbalance in this equilibrium between matrix degeneration and regeneration results in a decrease in the components of the ECM, and leads to loss of chondral damage. Therefore, it is important to tackle the degenerative process before the inflammatory metalloproteases set in by replenishing the collagen in the ECM. Collagen supplementation has been shown in research studies (in vitro and in vivo) to increase the thickness or volume of the cartilage tissue. Collagen can stimulate chondrocytes, which are responsible for the metabolic maintenance of the ECM.

== Different types of Alpha Collagen ==
- Collagen, type I, alpha 1
- Collagen, type II, alpha 1
- Collagen, type III, alpha 1
- Collagen, type IV, alpha 1
- Collagen, type V, alpha 1
- Collagen, type VI, alpha 1
- Collagen, type VII, alpha 1
- Collagen, type VIII, alpha 1
- Collagen, type IX, alpha 1
- Collagen, type X, alpha 1

And many further types of alpha collagen are identified.
