= Epidermolysis bullosa acquisita =

- Other names: Acquired epidermolysis bullosa
- Specialty: Dermatology

Epidermolysis bullosa acquisita, also known as acquired epidermolysis bullosa, is a longterm autoimmune blistering skin disease. It generally presents with fragile skin that blisters and becomes red with or without trauma. Marked scarring is left with thin skin, milia and nail changes. It typically begins around age 50.

It is caused by antibodies to type VII collagen within anchoring fibril structures located at the dermoepidermal junction in skin. Damaged skin may become infected.

Diagnosis is by observing the persistence of the condition, direct immunofluorescence, and detecting autoantibodies against type VII collagen. It can appear similar to porphyria cutanea tarda, pemphigoid, pemphigus, dermatitis herpetiformis, or blistering drug eruption. The condition is longterm and has no cure. A good response may be seen with corticosteroids, either alone or combined with azathioprine or dapsone.

It is rare, with around 0.08 to 0.5 new cases per million people per year, and it affects males and females equally.

== Signs and symptoms ==
It generally presents with fragile skin that blisters and becomes red with or without trauma. Marked scarring is left with thin skin, milia and nail changes. It typically begins around age 50.

== Cause ==
It is caused by antibodies to type VII collagen within anchoring fibril structures located at the dermoepidermal junction in skin.

== Diagnosis ==
Diagnosis is by observing the persistence of the condition, direct immunofluorescence, and detecting autoantibodies against type VII collagen. It can appear similar to porphyria cutanea tarda, pemphigoid, pemphigus, dermatitis herpetiformis, or blistering drug eruption.

== Treatment ==
The condition is longterm and has no cure. A good response may be seen with corticosteroids, either alone or combined with azathioprine or dapsone.

== Epidemiology ==
It is rare, with around 0.08 to 0.5 new cases per million people per year, and it affects males and females equally.

== See also ==
- List of cutaneous conditions
- List of target antigens in pemphigoid
- List of immunofluorescence findings for autoimmune bullous conditions
- List of human leukocyte antigen alleles associated with cutaneous conditions
