= Anchoring fibrils =

Anchoring fibrils (composed largely of type VII collagen) extend from the basal lamina of epithelial cells and attach to the lamina reticularis (also known as the reticular lamina) by wrapping around the reticular fiber (collagen III) bundles. The basal lamina and lamina reticularis together make up the basement membrane. Anchoring fibrils are essential to the functional integrity of the dermoepidermal junction.

== Epidermolysis bullosa dystrophica ==
Epidermolysis bullosa dystrophica, also known as Dystrophic EB (DEB) is a chronic skin condition caused when anchoring fibrils are abnormal, diminished, or absent. This causes a weak dermoepidermal junction, where the epidermis easily separates from the dermis causing much pain. This condition is caused by a mutation of COL7A1, the gene that codes for a type of collagen 7.

== See also ==
- Epidermis (skin)
- Dermis
- Lamina propria
- Connective tissue
