= Dermoepidermal junction =

Interface between the epidermal and dermal layers of the skin

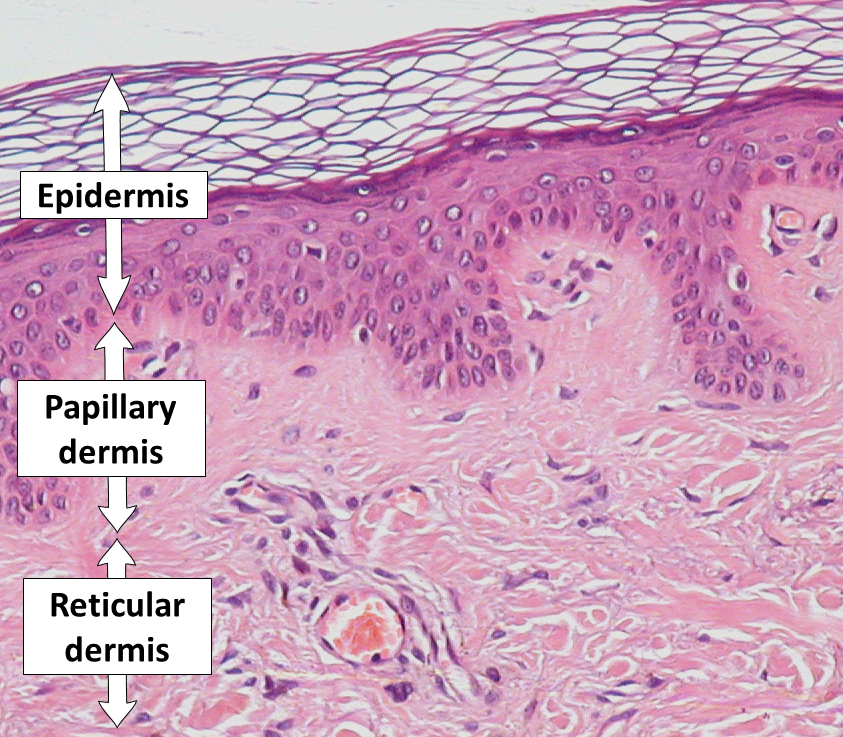
H&E stained section of human skin

The dermoepidermal junction or dermal-epidermal junction (DEJ) is the interface between the epidermal and the dermal layers of the skin. The basal cells of the epidermis connect to the basement membrane by the anchoring filaments of hemidesmosomes; the cells of the papillary layer of the dermis are attached to the basement membrane by anchoring fibrils, which consist of type VII collagen.

== Clinical significance ==
- Interface dermatitis includes conditions which primarily involve the dermoepidermal junction.
- Stevens–Johnson syndrome and toxic epidermal necrolysis are diseases where there is a breakdown of the dermoepidermal junction.
