= Beremagene geperpavec =

Gene therapy

Clinical data
- Trade names: Vyjuvek
- Other names: KB-103, beremagene geperpavec-svdt
- License data: US DailyMed: Beremagene geperpavec
- Routes of administration: Topical
- ATC code: D03AX16 (WHO)

Legal status
- Legal status: US: ℞-only; EU: Rx-only

Identifiers
- CAS Number: 2241888-62-8
- DrugBank: DB17831
- UNII: AQN7K24KQU
- KEGG: D12632

Beremagene geperpavec, sold under the brand name Vyjuvek, is a gene therapy used for the treatment of wounds. Beremagene geperpavec is the first approved gene therapy to use herpes-simplex virus type 1 as a vector. Beremagene geperpavec is a genetically modified (engineered in a laboratory) herpes-simplex virus used to deliver normal copies of the COL7A1 gene to the wounds.

The most common adverse reactions include itching, chills, redness, rash, cough and runny nose.

Beremagene geperpavec was approved for medical use in the United States in May 2023, and in the European Union in April 2025.

== Medical uses ==
Beremagene geperpavec is indicated for the treatment of wounds in people with dystrophic epidermolysis bullosa with mutation(s) in the collagen type VII alpha 1 chain (COL7A1) gene.

== History ==
The safety and effectiveness of beremagene geperpavec was established primarily in a randomized, double-blinded, placebo-controlled study involving a total of 31 subjects with dystrophic epidermolysis bullosa, including 30 subjects with recessive dystrophic epidermolysis bullosa and one subject with dominant dystrophic epidermolysis bullosa. In the study, two dystrophic epidermolysis bullosa wounds of comparable size on each participant were identified and randomized to receive either topical administration of beremagene geperpavec or the placebo on a weekly basis. The age of the subjects ranged from 1 year to 44 years (mean age 17 years). Efficacy was established by improved wound healing, defined as the difference in the proportion of confirmed complete (100%) wound closure between the beremagene geperpavec-treated and the placebo-treated wounds at 24 weeks. Sixty-five percent of the beremagene geperpavec-treated wounds completely closed while only 26% of the placebo-treated wound completely closed.

The US Food and Drug Administration (FDA) granted the application for beremagene geperpavec orphan drug, fast track, regenerative medicine advanced therapy, and priority review designations along with a rare pediatric disease priority review voucher. The FDA granted the approval of Vyjuvek to Krystal Biotech, Inc.

== Society and culture ==
=== Legal status ===
In February 2025, the Committee for Medicinal Products for Human Use of the European Medicines Agency adopted a positive opinion, recommending the granting of a marketing authorization for the medicinal product Vyjuvek, intended for the topical treatment of wounds in people with dystrophic epidermolysis bullosa caused by mutations in the collagen type 7 alpha 1 chain (COL7A1) gene. As Vyjuvek is an advanced therapy medicinal product, the CHMP positive opinion is based on an assessment by the Committee for Advanced Therapies. The applicant for this medicinal product is Krystal Biotech Netherlands, B.V. Vyjuvek was authorized for medical use in the European Union in April 2025.

In May 2026, the Medicines and Healthcare products Regulatory Agency in the United Kingdom approved the use of beremagene geperpavec to treat wounds in patients with dystrophic epidermolysis bullosa.
