= Ladinin 1 =

Protein found in humans

LAD1

Identifiers
- Aliases: LAD1, LadA, ladinin 1
- External IDs: OMIM: 602314; MGI: 109343; GeneCards: LAD1

Gene location (Human)
Chr.	Chromosome 1 (human)
Band	1q32.1	Start	201,380,833 bp
Band	1q32.1	End	201,399,915 bp

Gene location (Mouse)
Chr.	Chromosome 1 (mouse)
Band	1|1 E4	Start	135,746,336 bp
Band	1|1 E4	End	135,761,080 bp
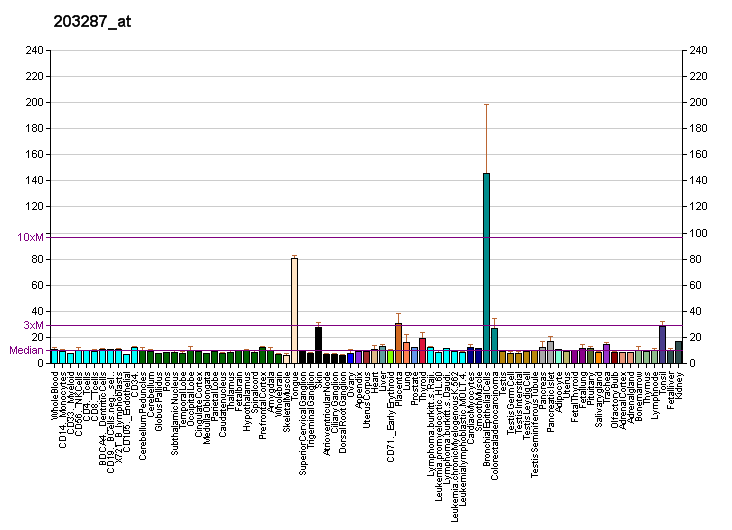

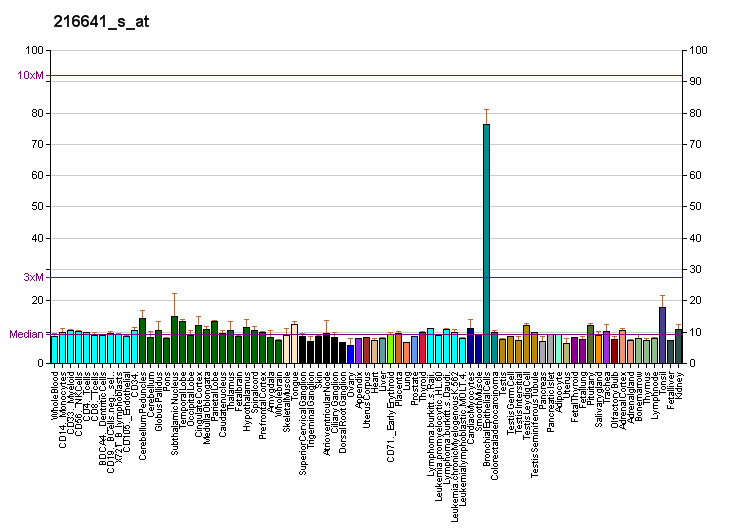
RNA expression pattern
Bgee	Human / Mouse (ortholog); Top expressed in: skin of abdomen; skin of leg; mucosa of transverse colon; gallbladder; mucosa of ileum; gums; gingival epithelium; rectum; epithelium of colon; mucosa of pharynx / Top expressed in: esophagus; lip; ileum; transitional epithelium of urinary bladder; epithelium of stomach; large intestine; left colon; duodenum; skin of abdomen; crypt of lieberkuhn of small intestine; More reference expression data
BioGPS	More reference expression data
Gene ontology
Molecular function	cadherin binding; structural molecule activity
Cellular component	extracellular exosome; extracellular region; basement membrane; actin cytoskeleton
Biological process	cell-cell adhesion
Sources:Amigo / QuickGO
Orthologs
Databases	NCBI: entry; OMA: entry
Species	Human	Mouse
Entrez	3898	16763
Ensembl	ENSG00000159166	ENSMUSG00000041782
UniProt	O00515	P57016
RefSeq (mRNA)	NM_005558	NM_133664
RefSeq (protein)	NP_005549	NP_598425
Location (UCSC)	Chr 1: 201.38 – 201.4 Mb	Chr 1: 135.75 – 135.76 Mb
PubMed search
- Wikidata
View/Edit Human	View/Edit Mouse

Ladinin-1 is a protein that in humans is encoded by the LAD1 gene.

The protein encoded by this gene may be an anchoring filament that is a component of basement membranes. It may contribute to the stability of the association of the epithelial layers with the underlying mesenchyme.
