= Kindler syndrome =

- Other names: Congenital poikiloderma with blisters and keratoses, Congenital poikiloderma with bullae and progressive cutaneous atrophy, Hereditary acrokeratotic poikiloderma, Hyperkeratosis–hyperpigmentation syndrome, Acrokeratotic poikiloderma, Weary–Kindler syndrome
- Kindler syndrome has an autosomal recessive pattern of inheritance.
- Specialty: Medical genetics, dermatology

Kindler syndrome (also known as "bullous acrokeratotic poikiloderma of Kindler and Weary") is a type of epidermolysis bullosa, a rare congenital disease presenting with skin blisters, caused by a mutation in the KIND1 gene.

== Symptoms and signs ==
Infants and young children with Kindler syndrome have a tendency to blister with minor trauma and are prone to sunburns. It has also been associated with ankyloglossia.

As individuals with Kindler syndrome age, they tend to have fewer problems with blistering and photosensitivity. However, pigment changes and thinning of the skin become more prominent.

In adults, palmoplantar hyperkeratosis can develop and epithelial cancers, such as squamous cell carcinoma typically at acral and mucosal sites. Kindler syndrome can affect various mucous tissues such as the mouth and eyes, which can lead to other health problems, like gingivitis, esophageal stenosis, and colitis.

== Cause ==
Kindler syndrome is the rarest of the epidermolysis bullosa types with only 400 cases known worldwide. It is an autosomal recessive genodermatosis. The KIND1 gene mutated in Kindler syndrome codes for the protein kindlin-1, which is thought to be active in the interactions between actin and the extracellular matrix (focal adhesion plaques). Kindler syndrome was first described in 1954 by Theresa Kindler in a 14-year-old girl.

== Diagnosis ==
Clinical and genetic tests are used to confirm diagnosis.

== Management ==
Treatment may involve several different types of practitioner to address the various manifestations that may occur. This multidisciplinary team will also be involved in preventing secondary complications.

== See also ==
- Rothmund–Thomson syndrome
- Epidermolysis bullosa
- List of cutaneous conditions
