= Collagen, type VIII, alpha 1 =

Protein found in humans

COL8A1
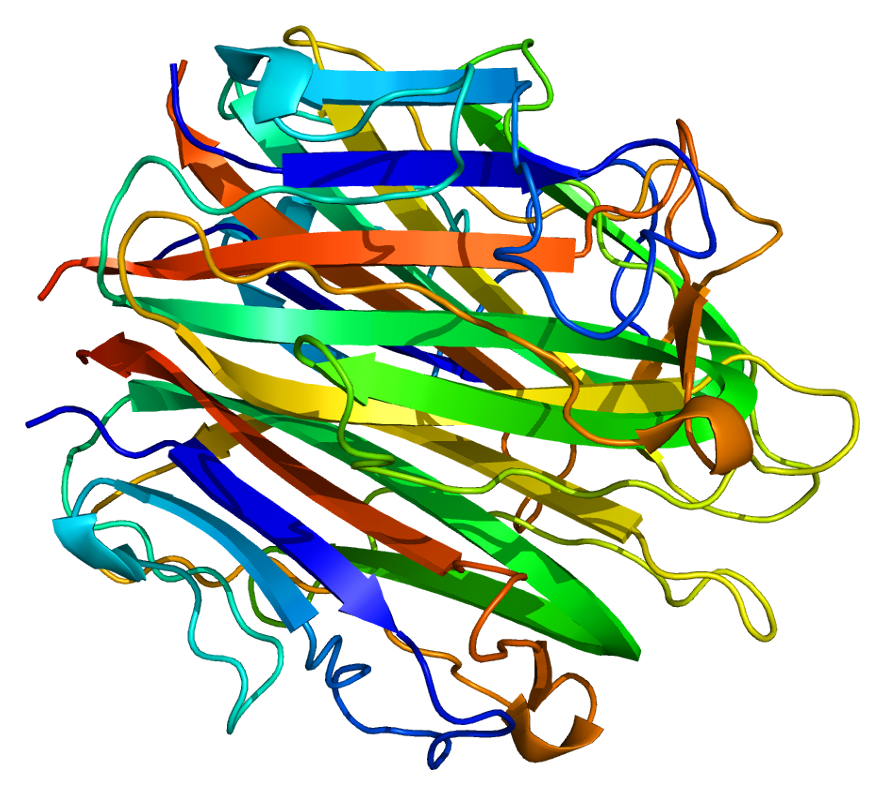

Identifiers
- Aliases: COL8A1, C3orf7, collagen type VIII alpha 1, collagen type VIII alpha 1 chain
- External IDs: OMIM: 120251; MGI: 88463; GeneCards: COL8A1
Available structures
PDB	Ortholog search: PDBe RCSB
PDB	List of PDB id codes 1O91

Gene location (Human)
Chr.	Chromosome 3 (human)
Band	3q12.1	Start	99,638,475 bp
Band	3q12.1	End	99,799,226 bp

Gene location (Mouse)
Chr.	Chromosome 16 (mouse)
Band	16|16 C1.1	Start	57,444,621 bp
Band	16|16 C1.1	End	57,575,100 bp
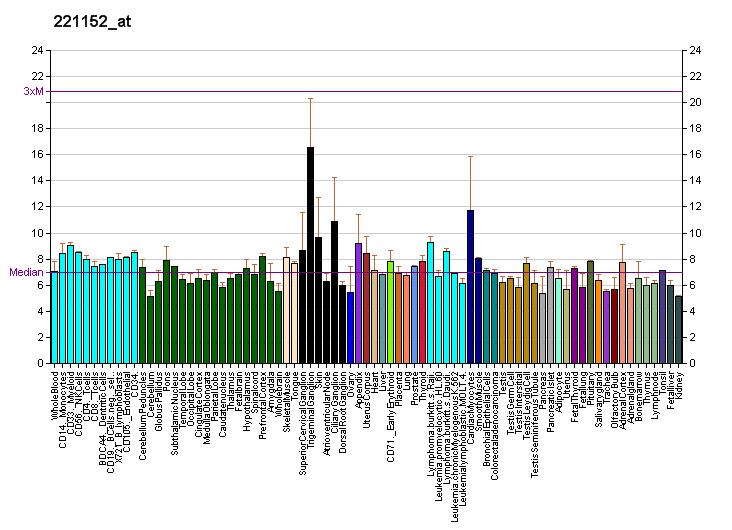
RNA expression pattern
Bgee	Human / Mouse (ortholog); Top expressed in: visceral pleura; retinal pigment epithelium; right coronary artery; popliteal artery; tibial arteries; sural nerve; parietal pleura; germinal epithelium; thoracic aorta; ascending aorta / Top expressed in: pineal gland; retinal pigment epithelium; calvaria; vestibular membrane of cochlear duct; Epithelium of choroid plexus; choroid plexus of fourth ventricle; skin of external ear; body of femur; stroma of bone marrow; vestibular sensory epithelium; More reference expression data
BioGPS	More reference expression data
Gene ontology
Molecular function	protein binding; extracellular matrix structural constituent; extracellular matrix structural constituent conferring tensile strength
Cellular component	extracellular matrix; basement membrane; collagen type VIII trimer; collagen; endoplasmic reticulum lumen; extracellular exosome; extracellular region; extracellular space; collagen-containing extracellular matrix
Biological process	collagen catabolic process; cell adhesion; extracellular matrix organization; epithelial cell proliferation; endodermal cell differentiation; camera-type eye morphogenesis; angiogenesis; positive regulation of cell-substrate adhesion
Sources:Amigo / QuickGO
Orthologs
Databases	NCBI: entry; OMA: entry
Species	Human	Mouse
Entrez	1295	12837
Ensembl	ENSG00000144810	ENSMUSG00000068196
UniProt	P27658	Q00780
RefSeq (mRNA)	NM_001850; NM_020351	NM_007739
RefSeq (protein)	NP_001841; NP_065084	NP_031765
Location (UCSC)	Chr 3: 99.64 – 99.8 Mb	Chr 16: 57.44 – 57.58 Mb
PubMed search
- Wikidata
View/Edit Human	View/Edit Mouse

Collagen alpha-1(VIII) chain is a protein that in humans is encoded by the COL8A1 gene.

This gene encodes one of the two alpha chains of type VIII collagen. The gene product is a short chain collagen and a major component of the basement membrane of the corneal endothelium. The type VIII collagen fibril can be either a homo- or a heterotrimer. Alternatively spliced transcript variants encoding the same isoform have been observed.
