= Lamina lucida =

Layer of the skin

The lamina lucida is a component of the basement membrane which is found between the epithelium and underlying connective tissue (e.g., epidermis and dermis of the skin). It is a roughly 40 nanometre wide electron-lucent zone between the plasma membrane of the basal cells and the (electron-dense) lamina densa of the basement membrane. The lamina lucida is comprised mainly of laminins.

Similarly, electron-lucent and electron-dense zones can be seen between enamel of teeth and the junctional epithelium. The electron-lucent zone is adjacent to the cells of the junctional epithelium and might be considered a continuation of the lamina lucida as both are seen to harbour hemidesmosomes. However, unlike the lamina densa, the electron-dense zone adjacent to enamel show no signs of hemidesmosomes.

== See also ==
- Basal lamina
- List of target antigens in pemphigoid
