= Epidermolysis bullosa dystrophica =

Medical condition

- Other names: Dystrophic EB
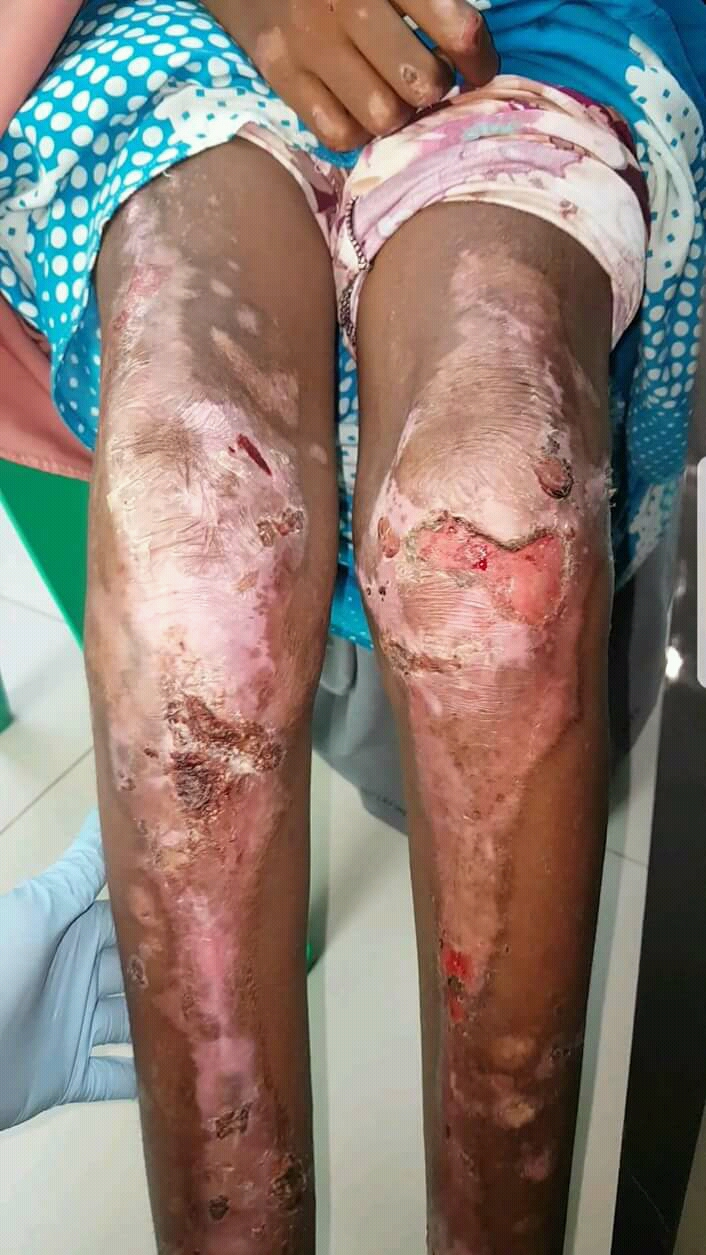
- The legs of an individual with dystrophic epidermolysis bullosa.
- Specialty: Medical genetics

Epidermolysis bullosa dystrophica or dystrophic EB (DEB) is an inherited disease affecting the skin and other organs.

"Butterfly child" is the colloquial name for children born with the disease, as their skin is seen to be as delicate and fragile as the wings of a butterfly.

== Signs and symptoms ==
The deficiency in anchoring fibrils impairs the adherence between the epidermis and the underlying dermis. This deficiency occurs due to the genetic mutation(s) in the COL7A1 gene in chromosome 3. The COL7A1 gene in chromosome 3 is responsible for coding for type VII collagen, a protein that assists in helping anchor the epidermis and dermis. Thus, the skin of DEB patients is highly susceptible to mild to severe blistering, depending on the subtype. Collagen VII is also associated with the epithelium of the esophageal lining, and DEB patients may have chronic scarring, webbing, and obstruction of the esophagus. Affected individuals are often severely malnourished due to trauma to the oral and esophageal mucosa and require feeding tubes for nutrition. They also have iron-deficiency anemia of uncertain origin, which leads to chronic fatigue.

Open wounds on the skin heal slowly or not at all, often scarring extensively, and are particularly susceptible to infection. Many individuals bathe in a bleach and water mixture to fight off these infections. The chronic inflammation leads to errors in the DNA of the affected skin cells, which in turn causes squamous cell carcinoma (SCC). The majority of these patients die before the age of 30, either of SCC or complications related to DEB.

The chronic inflammatory state seen in recessive dystrophic epidermolysis bullosa (RDEB) may cause small fiber peripheral neuropathy (SFN). RDEB patients have reported the sensation of pain in line with neuropathic pain qualities.

== Causes ==
DEB is caused by genetic defects (or mutations) within the human COL7A1 gene encoding the protein type VII collagen (collagen VII). DEB-causing mutations can be either dominant or recessive. Most families with family members with this condition have distinct mutations.

Collagen VII is a very large molecule (300 kDa) that dimerizes to form a semicircular looping structure: the anchoring fibril. Anchoring fibrils are thought to form a structural link between the epidermal basement membrane and the fibrillar collagens in the upper dermis.

== Pathophysiology ==
In the absence of mutations of the COL7A1 gene, an autoimmune response against type VII collagen can result in an acquired form of epidermolysis bullosa called epidermolysis bullosa acquisita.

There exist other types of inherited epidermolysis bullosa, junctional epidermolysis bullosa and epidermolysis bullosa simplex, which are not related to type VII collagen deficiency. These arise from mutations in the genes encoding other proteins of the epidermis or the basement membrane at the junction between the epidermis and the dermis.

== Diagnosis ==
=== Classification ===
Name	Locus & Gene	OMIM
Dominant dystrophic epidermolysis bullosa (DDEB) Also known as "Cockayne-Touraine disease", this variant is characterized by vesicles and bullae on the extensor surfaces of the extremities.	3p21.3 (COL7A1)	131750
Recessive dystrophic epidermolysis bullosa (RDEB) Also known as "Hallopeau–Siemens variant of epidermolysis bullosa" and "Hallopeau–Siemens disease", this variant results from mutations in the gene encoding type VII collagen, COL7A1, characterized by debilitating oral lesions that produce pain, scarring, and microstomia. It is named for François Henri Hallopeau and Hermann Werner Siemens.	3q22-q23 (COL7A1), 3p21.3 (MMP1)	226600
Epidermolysis bullosa dystrophica, pretibial	3p21.3 (COL7A1)	131850
Epidermolysis bullosa pruriginosa	3p21.3 (COL7A1)	604129
Epidermolysis bullosa with congenital localized absence of skin and deformity of nails	3p21.3 (COL7A1)	132000
Transient bullous dermolysis of the newborn (TBDN)	3p21.3 (COL7A1)	131705

== Treatment ==
In May 2023, the US Food and Drug Administration (FDA) approved Vyjuvek for the treatment of wounds in people with dystrophic epidermolysis bullosa with mutation(s) in the collagen type VII alpha 1 chain (COL7A1) gene.

=== Birch triterpenes ===
Birch triterpenes, sold under the brand name Filsuvez, is an extract of birch bark used as a topical medication for the treatment of epidermolysis bullosa. The active ingredients are triterpenes extracted from the outer bark of silver birch (Betula pendula) and downy birch (Betula pubescens).

The most common side effects include wound complications such as skin reactions at the application site, infections, pruritus (itching), and hypersensitivity.

Birch triterpenes was approved for medical use in the European Union in June 2022, and in the United States in December 2023.
