= Hemidesmosome =

Structures connecting keratinocyte cells to the extracellular matrix

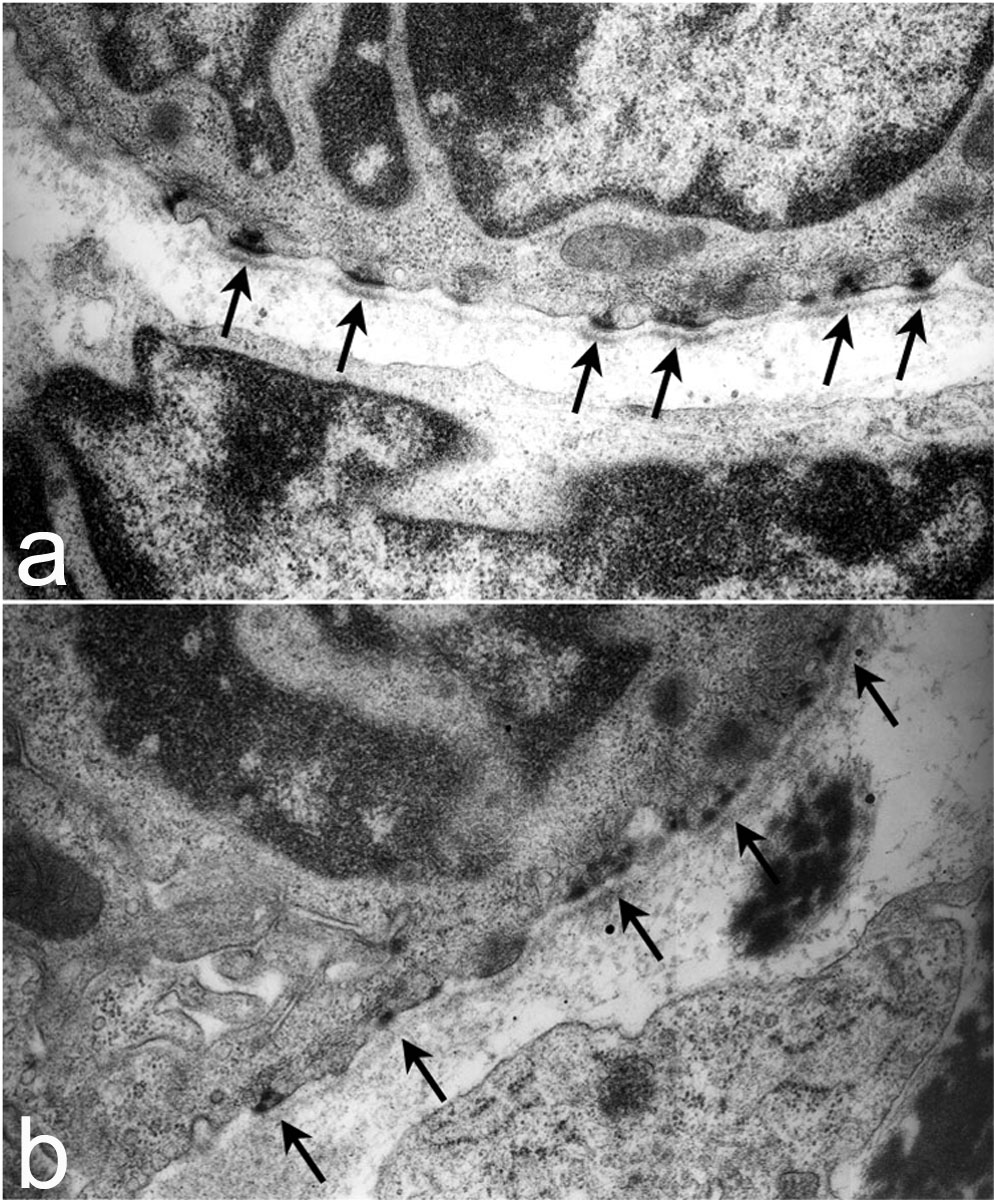
- Ultrastructure of tracheal hemidesmosomes in mice. In a normal mouse (a) there are well-defined, organized hemidesmosomes with darkened areas in the lamina densa abutting the hemidesmosome (arrows). In contrast, hemidesmosomes in Lamc2 -/- tracheas (b) are less organized, the intracellular component is more diffuse, and the lamina densa directly below the hemidesmosomal areas lacks the electron density seen in the littermate control (arrows). From Nguyen et al., 2006.

Details

Identifiers
- Latin: hemidesmosoma
- MeSH: D022002
- TH: H1.00.01.1.02029
- FMA: 67415

Hemidesmosomes are very small stud-like structures found in keratinocytes of the epidermis of skin that attach to the extracellular matrix. They are similar in form to desmosomes when visualized by electron microscopy; however, desmosomes attach to adjacent cells. Hemidesmosomes are also comparable to focal adhesions, as they both attach cells to the extracellular matrix. Instead of desmogleins and desmocollins in the extracellular space, hemidesmosomes utilize integrins. Hemidesmosomes are found in epithelial cells connecting the basal epithelial cells to the basement membrane. Hemidesmosomes are also involved in signaling pathways, such as keratinocyte migration or carcinoma cell intrusion.

== Structure ==
Hemidesmosomes can be categorized into two types based on their protein constituents. Type 1 hemidesmosomes are found in stratified and pseudo-stratified epithelium. Type 1 hemidesmosomes have five main elements: integrin α6β4, plectin in its isoform 1a, i. e. P1a, tetraspanin protein CD151, BPAG1e, or bullous pemphigoid antigen isoform e, and BPAG2 (also known as BP180 or type 17 collagen). Type 1 hemidesmosomes are found in stratified and pseudostratified epithelial tissue. Type 2 hemidesmosomes contain integrin α6β4 and plectin without the BP antigens.

Hemidesmosomes have two membrane-spanning components: Integrin α6β4 and BPAG2. Integrin α6β4 operates as a laminin-332 receptor. Integrin α6β4 is composed to two α and β subunit dimers. The larger β4 subunit has domains that bind to fibronectin III and calcium. The α6 subunit binds to extracellular BP180, CD151 and laminin-322. When integrin α6β4 binds to Plectin 1a and BPAG1, it associates with the keratin intermediate filaments in the cytoskeleton.

Hemidesmosomes are linked to keratin by plectin isoform 1a from the plakin protein family. Plectin is a 500 kDa protein with a long, rod-like domain and a domain at the end that contains an intermediate filament binding site. BPAG2, or (bullous pemphigoid antigen 2), is a transmembrane protein that exists adjacent to integrins, BPAG2 has domains that bind to plectin, integrin β4 subunit in the cytoplasm and integrin α6 and laminin-332 in the extracellular space. CD151, a protein of the tetraspanin superfamily, resides on the cell surface of keratinocytes and vascular endothelium. CD151 aids in hemidesmosome formation. BPAG1e is an antigen with multiple isoforms that binds to integrin α6β4, BPAG2 and keratin 5 and 14. The main role of BPAG1e is for hemidesmosome stability.

== Diseases ==
Keeping the basal epidermal keratinocytes attached to the basal lamina is vital for skin homeostasis. Genetic or acquired diseases that cause disruption of hemidesmosome components can lead to skin blistering disorders between different layers of the skin. These are collectively coined epidermolysis bullosa, or EB. Typical symptoms include fragile skin, blister development, and erosion from minor physical stress. However, the disease also can manifest as erosions on the cornea, trachea, gastrointestinal tract, esophagus, muscular dystrophy and muscular deformity.

Mutations in 12 different genes that code for parts of the hemidesmosome have led to epidermolysis bullosa. There are three types of EB: EB simplex (EBS), dystrophic EB (DEB) and junctional EB (JEB). In epidermolysis bullosa simplex, layers of the epidermis separate. EBS is caused by mutations coding for keratin, plectin and BPAG1e. With junctional epidermolysis bullosa, layers of the lamina lucida (part of the basal lamina) separate. This is caused by mutations in integrin α6β4, laminin 322 and BPAG2. In dystrophic epidermolysis bullosa, the layers of the papillary dermis separate from the anchoring fibrils. This is caused by mutations in the collagen 7 gene.

== See also ==
- Desmosome
- Epidermolysis bullosa
- Focal adhesion
