= Collagen, type VII, alpha 1 =

Protein found in humans

COL7A1

Identifiers
- Aliases: COL7A1, EBD1, EBDCT, EBR1, NDNC8, collagen type VII alpha 1, collagen type VII alpha 1 chain
- External IDs: OMIM: 120120; MGI: 88462; GeneCards: COL7A1

Gene location (Human)
| Chr. | Chromosome 3 (human) |
| Band | 3p21.31 | Start | 48,564,073 bp |
| Band | 3p21.31 | End | 48,595,329 bp |

Gene location (Mouse)
| Chr. | Chromosome 9 (mouse) |
| Band | 9 F2|9 59.63 cM | Start | 108,782,654 bp |
| Band | 9 F2|9 59.63 cM | End | 108,813,943 bp |
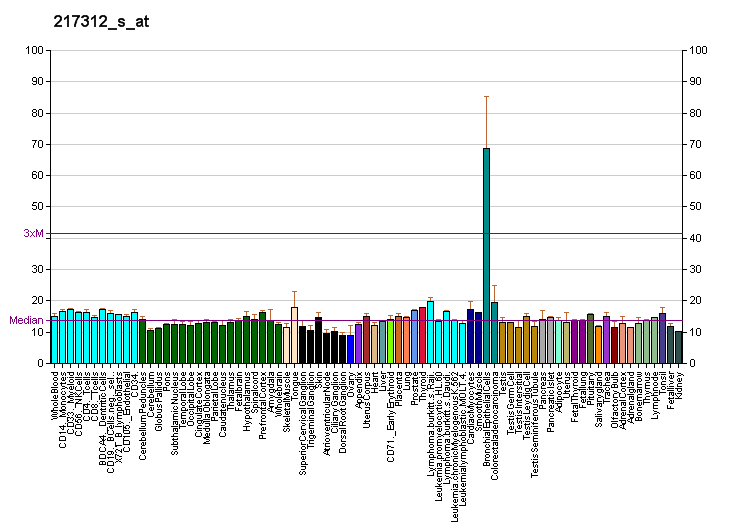

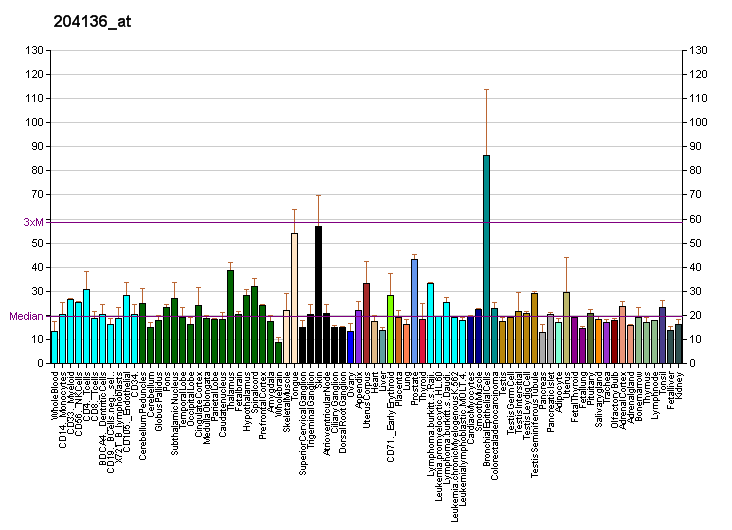
RNA expression pattern
| Bgee | Human / Mouse (ortholog); Top expressed in: stromal cell of endometrium; skin of abdomen; skin of leg; olfactory zone of nasal mucosa; right hemisphere of cerebellum; ectocervix; canal of the cervix; vagina; skin of arm; right testis / Top expressed in: lip; corneal stroma; molar; lactiferous gland; neural layer of retina; muscle of thigh; lacrimal gland; conjunctival fornix; parotid gland; skin of back; More reference expression data |
| BioGPS | More reference expression data |
Gene ontology
| Molecular function | peptidase inhibitor activity; protein binding; serine-type endopeptidase inhibitor activity; identical protein binding; extracellular matrix structural constituent conferring tensile strength |
| Cellular component | collagen; endoplasmic reticulum lumen; collagen type VII trimer; extracellular matrix; extracellular region; basement membrane; COPII-coated ER to Golgi transport vesicle; endoplasmic reticulum-Golgi intermediate compartment membrane; Golgi membrane; extracellular space; collagen-containing extracellular matrix |
| Biological process | negative regulation of peptidase activity; endodermal cell differentiation; extracellular matrix organization; endoplasmic reticulum to Golgi vesicle-mediated transport; COPII vesicle coating; cell adhesion; epidermis development; collagen catabolic process; negative regulation of endopeptidase activity; growth plate cartilage chondrocyte morphogenesis |
Sources:Amigo / QuickGO
Orthologs
| Databases | NCBI: entry; OMA: entry |
| Species | Human | Mouse |
| Entrez | 1294 | 12836 |
| Ensembl | ENSG00000114270 | ENSMUSG00000025650 |
| UniProt | Q02388 | Q63870 |
| RefSeq (mRNA) | NM_000094 | NM_007738 |
| RefSeq (protein) | NP_000085 | NP_031764 |
| Location (UCSC) | Chr 3: 48.56 – 48.6 Mb | Chr 9: 108.78 – 108.81 Mb |
| PubMed search |
- Wikidata
| View/Edit Human | View/Edit Mouse |

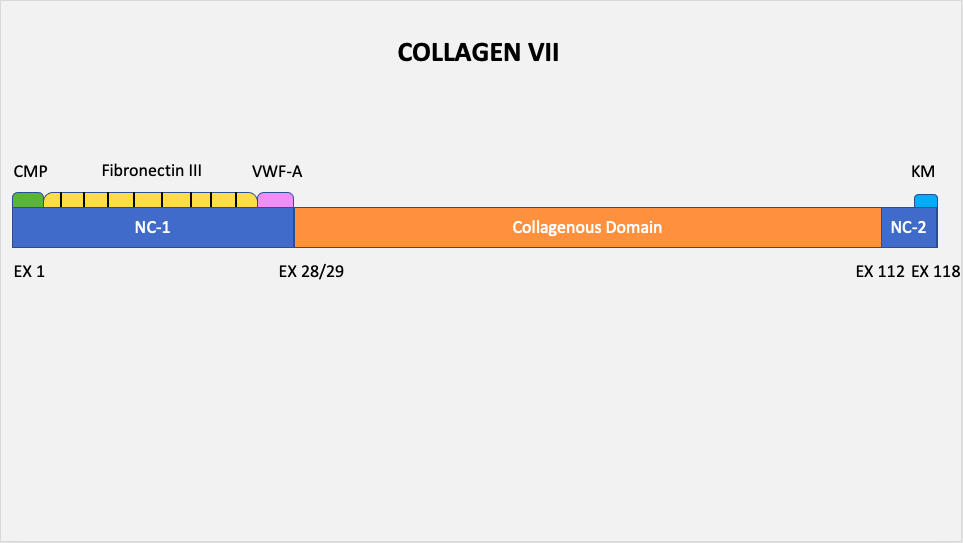
Domains and subdomains of Collagen VII, including the position of the exons (EX) encoding each domain.

Collagen alpha-1(VII) chain is a protein that in humans is encoded by the COL7A1 gene. It is composed of a triple helical, collagenous domain flanked by two non-collagenous domains, and functions as an anchoring fibril between the dermal-epidermal junction in the basement membrane. Mutations in COL7A1 cause all types of dystrophic epidermolysis bullosa, and the exact mutations vary based on the specific type or subtype. It has been shown that interactions between the NC-1 domain of collagen VII and several other proteins, including laminin-5 and collagen IV, contribute greatly to the overall stability of the basement membrane.

== Structure ==
Type VII collagen is composed of three main domains in the following order: a non-collagenous domain, abbreviated NC-1; a collagenous domain; and a second non-collagenous domain, NC-2. The NC-1 domain has a cartilage matrix protein (CMP), nine fibronectin III (FNIII)-like subdomains, and a von Willebrand Factor A-like subdomain (VWFA1); a notable segment in the NC-2 domain is analogous to a Kunitz protease inhibitor molecule.

== Function ==
This gene encodes the alpha chain of type VII collagen. The type VII collagen fibril, composed of three identical alpha collagen chains, is restricted to the basement zone beneath stratified squamous epithelia. It functions as an anchoring fibril between the external epithelia and the underlying stroma. Mutations in this gene are associated with all forms of dystrophic epidermolysis bullosa. In the absence of mutations, however, an autoimmune response against type VII collagen can result in an acquired form of this disease called epidermolysis bullosa acquisita.

Type VII collagen is also found in the retina; its function in this organ is unknown.

COL7A1 is located on the short arm of human chromosome 3, in the chromosomal region denoted 3p21.31. The gene is approximately 31,000 base pairs in size and is remarkable for the extreme fragmentation of its coding sequence into 118 exons. COL7A1 is transcribed into an mRNA of 9,287 bases. In the skin, the type VII collagen protein is synthesized by keratinocytes and dermal fibroblasts.

The symbol for the orthologous gene in the mouse is Col7a1.

== Clinical significance ==
The inherited disease, dystrophic epidermolysis bullosa, is caused by recessive or dominant mutations in COL7A1. Recessive dystrophic epidermolysis bullosa, the most severe type of epidermolysis bullosa, has two subtypes, generalized intermediate and generalized severe, which have been linked to different mutations in the COL7A1 gene. Recessive dystrophic epidermolysis bullosa, generalized intermediate, is caused primarily by missense, in-frame, and splice-site mutations on one allele. The generalized severe subtype may be caused by premature termination codons in both alleles. These mutations cause little to no expression of collagen VII, which manifests primarily as generalized blistering in the skin and mucosal membranes. This blistering may also lead to several other complications, such as eye abrasions, esophageal stricture, deformity of the hands and feet, and squamous cell carcinoma, among others.

Dominant dystrophic epidermolysis bullosa is most often caused by missense mutations, especially glycine substitutions in the collagenous domain. The symptoms of dominant dystrophic epidermolysis bullosa are less severe than those of the recessive types, with mild blistering and loss of nails.

Epidermolysis bullosa acquisita involves an autoimmune reaction to this form of collagen.

Beremagene geperpavec (Vyjuvek), is a gene therapy indicated for the treatment of wounds for people with dystrophic epidermolysis bullosa with mutation(s) in the collagen type VII alpha 1 chain (COL7A1) gene.

== Interactions ==
Collagen, type VII, alpha 1 forms a complex network with several other proteins in the basement membrane. It has been shown to interact with laminin 5 and fibronectin, as well as collagen IV, by binding these proteins in the NC-1 domain. The stability of the basement membrane and dermal-epidermal junction is thought to be due to these interactions.

== See also ==
- Collagen
