= Basement membrane =

Thin fibrous layer between the cells and the adjacent connective tissue in animals

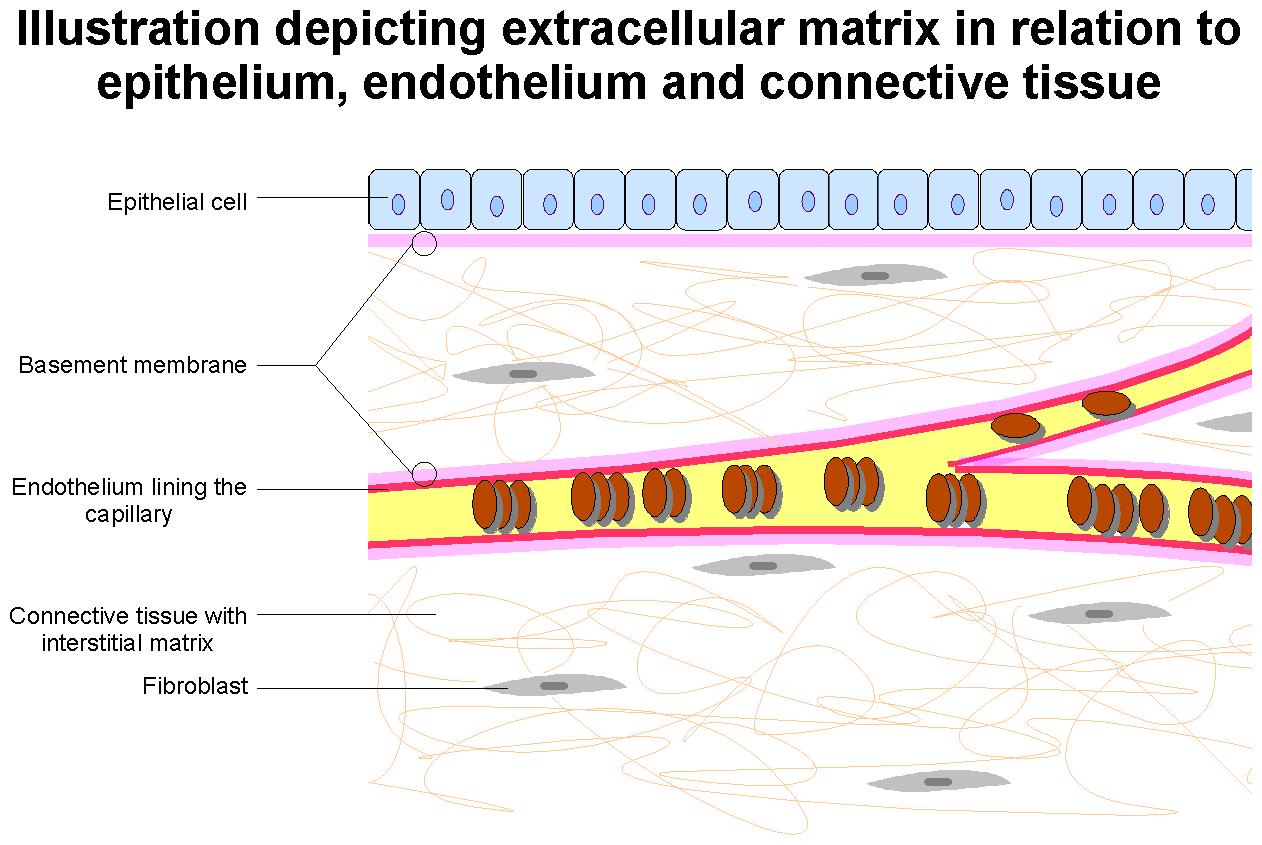
- The epithelium and basement membrane in relation to epithelium and endothelium. Also seen are other extracellular matrix components

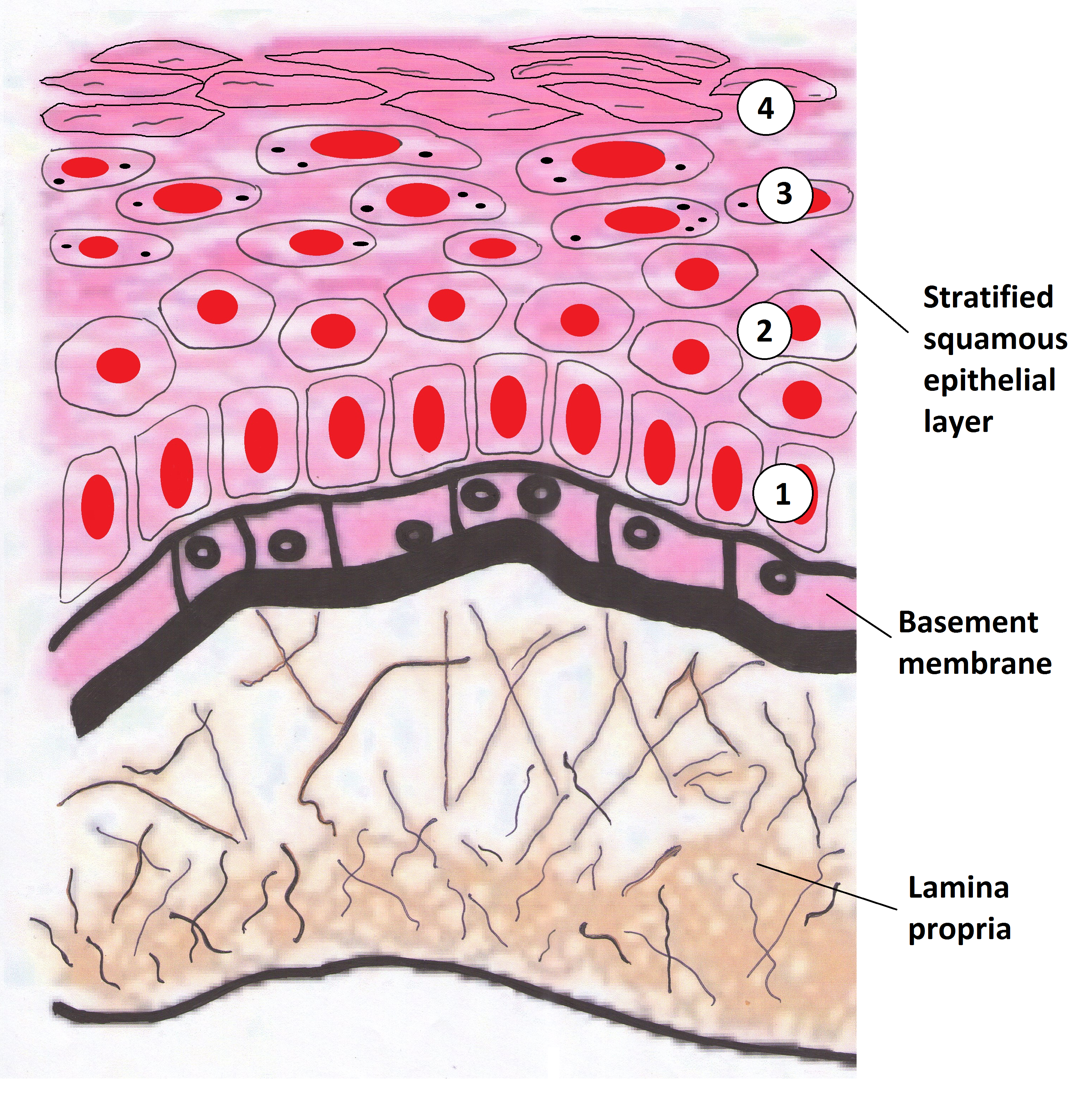
- Image showing the basement membrane of the oral mucosa, the type of epithelial tissue that lines the mouth, overlying a thin layer of connective tissue known as the lamina propria in mucous membranes

Details

Identifiers
- Latin: membrana basalis
- MeSH: D001485
- TH: H2.00.00.0.00005
- FMA: 63872

The basement membrane, also known as the basal lamina, is a specialized form of extracellular matrix (ECM) common to all multicellular animals. It is a very thin, flexible, and strong sheet-like type of ECM that provides a supporting base for all types of epithelial tissue, separates it from another cell layer such as endothelium, and anchors it to the underlying connective tissue (stroma).

A basement membrane also surrounds some individual cells, including muscle cells, fat cells, and Schwann cells, separating them from surrounding connective tissue. Its composition can vary from tissue to tissue, and even in different regions of the same tissue. The other type of ECM is the interstitial matrix. The basement membrane may be described as having two layers or laminae, an external basal lamina, facing the epithelium, and an internal basal lamina that faces the connective tissue. These two laminae are also known as the basal lamina and the reticular lamina.

The basement membrane also acts as a platform for complex cell signaling, for polarization, migration, and differentiation. It also regulates the exchange of materials between the epithelium and underlying tissues; binds growth factors from the connective tissue to the epithelium that control the development of epithelium. Epithelial cells are pressed closely together having no blood vessels between them but their basement membrane mostly rests on a bed of loose connective tissue that is rich in blood vessels providing nutrients and removing waste.

== Structure ==
The basement membrane was first described in skeletal muscle tissue in the 1800s. The beginnings of a molecular understanding only came about in the 1970s and 1980s.

Epithelial cells are polarized. The surface of epithelial cells that face the lumen is the apical surface, and the surface facing the basement membrane is the basal surface.

The basement membrane may be described as having two layers or laminae, an external basal lamina, facing the epithelium, and an internal basal lamina that faces the connective tissue. These two laminae are also known as the basal lamina and the reticular lamina. The cells in the internal basal membrane that are closest to the connective tissue show high rates of mitosis, needed to replace skin cell abrasions, and in the GI tract replacement of the cells exposed to digestive enzymes and gastric acid. In the skin the basement membrane is part of a more complex basement membrane zone. In the mucous membrane linings such as the gastric mucosa the basement membrane overlies loose connective tissue known as the lamina propria.

The basement membrane is synthesized by cells on either side. One set of components are synthesized from the basal epithelial cells, and the other comes from the underlying connective tissue. Together the basement membrane contains glycoproteins – laminins, type IV collagen, and nidogen, and proteoglycans – perlecan, heparan sulfate proteoglycan, and agrin that blend together. Other components may include fibronectin and type XVIII collagen. The components can vary from tissue to tissue, and from regions in the same lamina.

The underlying connective tissue attaches to the basal lamina with collagen VII anchoring fibrils and fibrillin microfibrils.

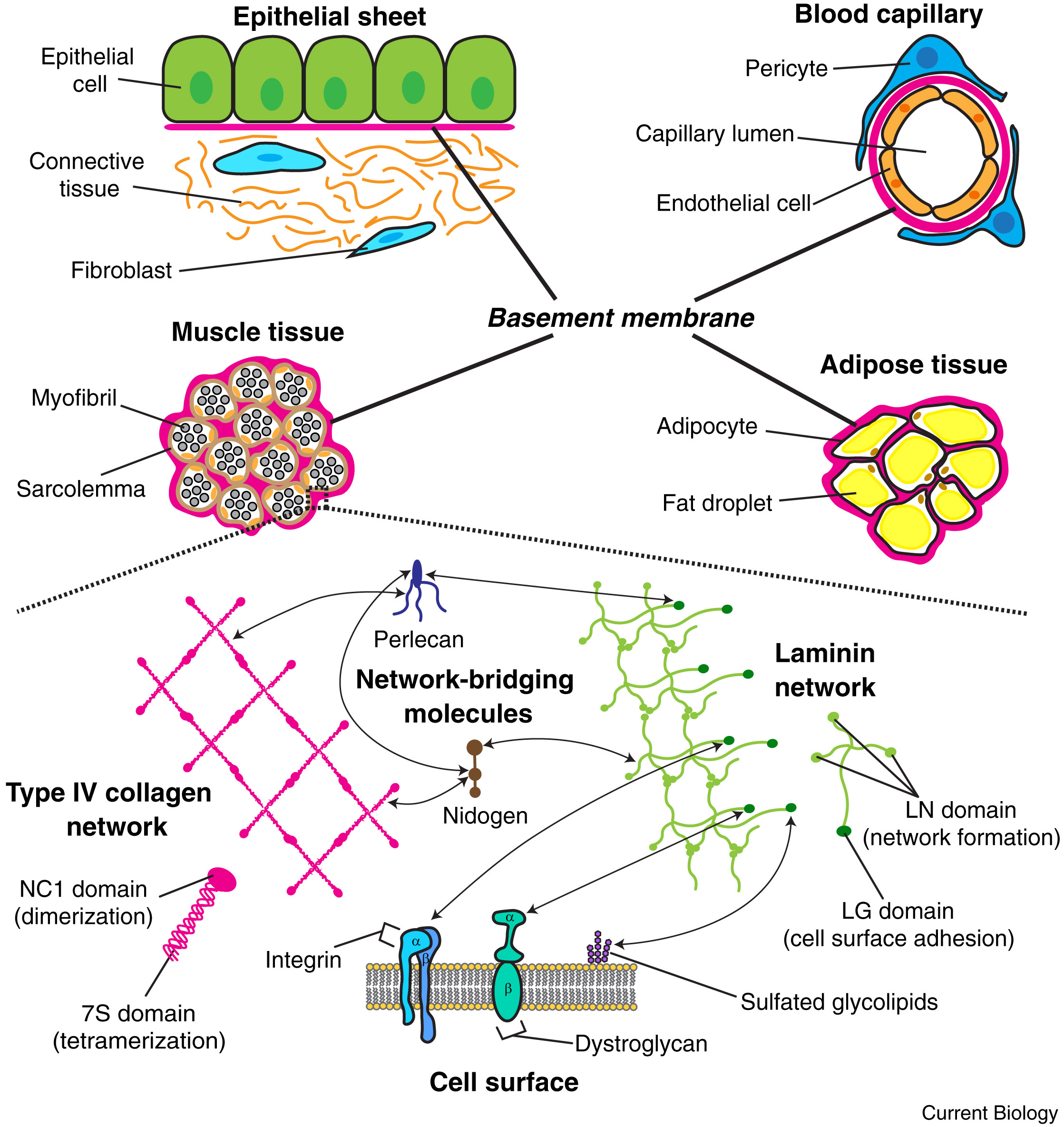
Organization of basement membrane

== Types ==
The glomerular basement membrane of the kidney, is an unusually thick basement membrane. It serves as part of a molecular filter that prevents macromolecules from the blood from entering the urine. It is faced by a cell layer on either side, the endothelium, and the podocytes, and has a thicker structure of three laminae. It is thicker by the fusion of the basal lamina from the endothelium of glomerular capillaries and the podocyte basal lamina. These layers are known as the central lamina densa, and on each side, a lamina rara – a lamina rara interna facing the endothelium, and a lamina rara externa facing the podocytes.

In the lung the basement membrane of the alveolus and that of the surrounding capillary are fused, allowing an easy exchange of gases.

In the mucosae the basement membrane lies between one or more layers of epithelial cells that it supports, and the underlying attached loose connective tissue called the lamina propria.

=== Basement membrane zone ===
In the skin the basement membrane that separates, and connects the epidermis and the underlying dermis is part of a complex and specialized structure called the basement membrane zone (BMZ). The BMZ has four distinct layers – the basal cell layer, the lamina lucida, the lamina densa, and the sublaminal densa, and has many functions. Tiny microfilaments called tonofilaments cross the basal cell layer, and extend to the epidermal part of the hemidesmosome. Laminins and other adherence proteins are located in the lamina lucida. The lamina densa is mostly composed of a type IV collagen scaffold. Anchoring fibrils and microfilaments extend and blend with the elastic fibrillary system of the dermis.

The components of the BMZ form a complex, functional network that extends from the basal epidermal keratinocytes and their hemidesmosomes, and include anchoring fibrils from the lamina densa, into the extracellular matrix (ECM) of the dermis. In the ECM the anchoring fibrils appear as cross-striated fibrous masses. There are also focal adhesion complexes on the outer cell membrane that bind the cytoskeleton to cell-matrix adhesions.

== Function ==
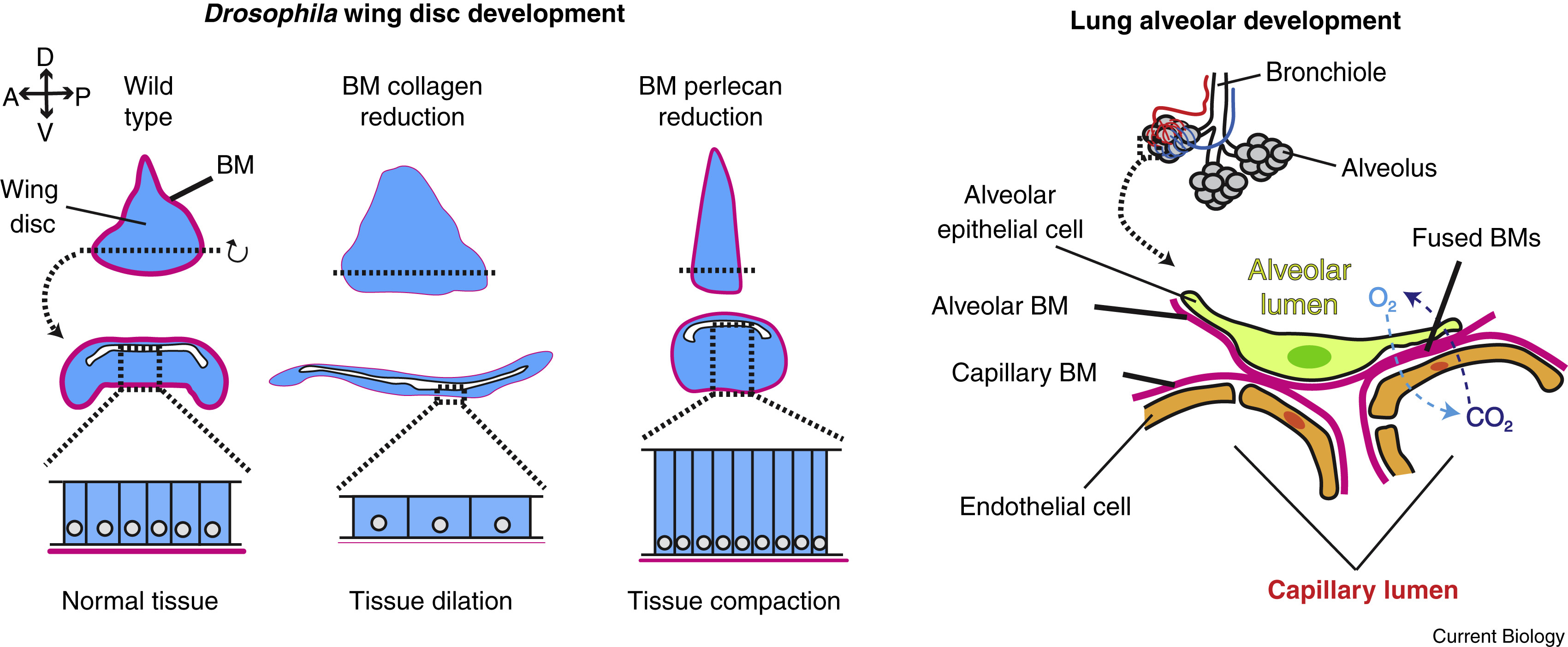
Basement membrane role in tissue development of Drosophila wing and lung alveoli

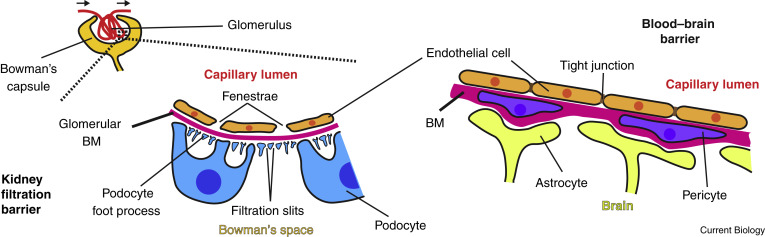
Basement membranes in kidney glomerulus and in blood–brain barrier

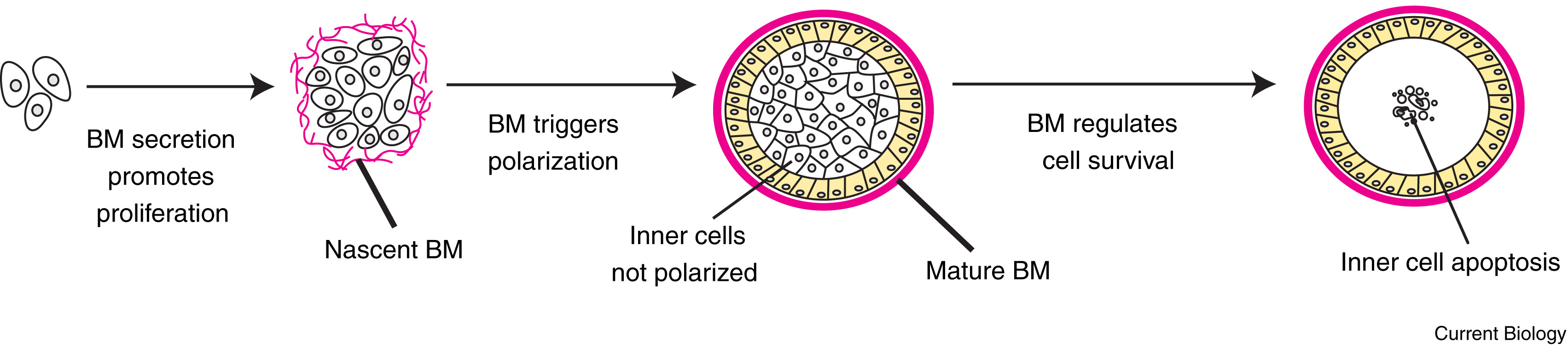
Basement membrane triggers cell proliferation and polarity

The primary function of the basement membrane is to anchor the epithelium to its underlying loose connective tissue (stroma) This is achieved by cell-matrix adhesions through cell adhesion molecules.

The basement membrane acts as a mechanical barrier, preventing malignant cells from invading the deeper tissues. Early stages of malignancy that are thus limited to the epithelial layer by the basement membrane are called carcinoma in situ.

The basement membrane is also essential for angiogenesis (development of new blood vessels). Basement membrane proteins have been found to accelerate differentiation of endothelial cells.

Other roles for the basement membrane include blood filtration and muscle homeostasis. Fractones may be a type of basement membrane, serving as a niche for stem cells.

== Clinical significance ==
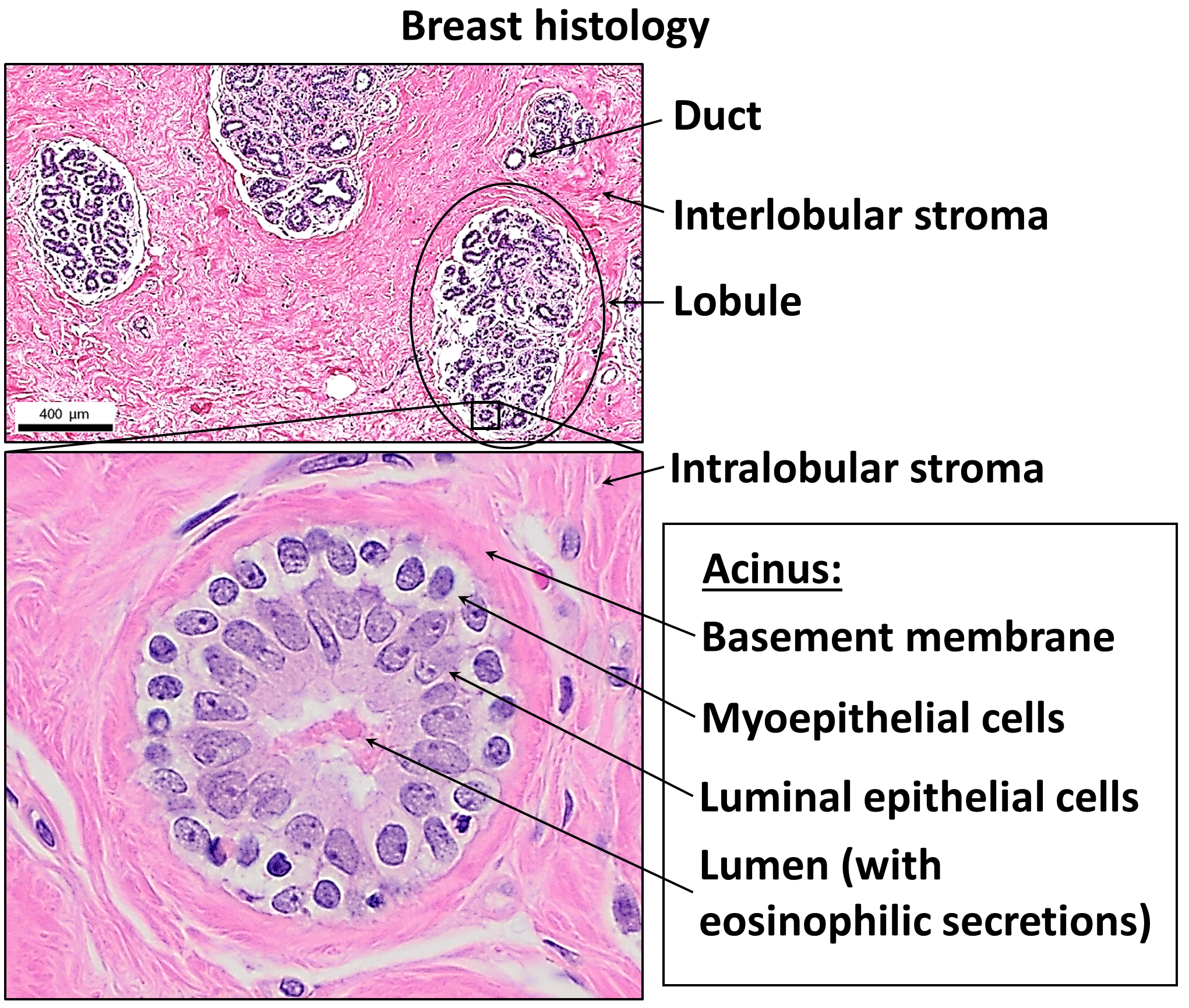
Normal histology of the breast, with basement membrane annotated near center-right.

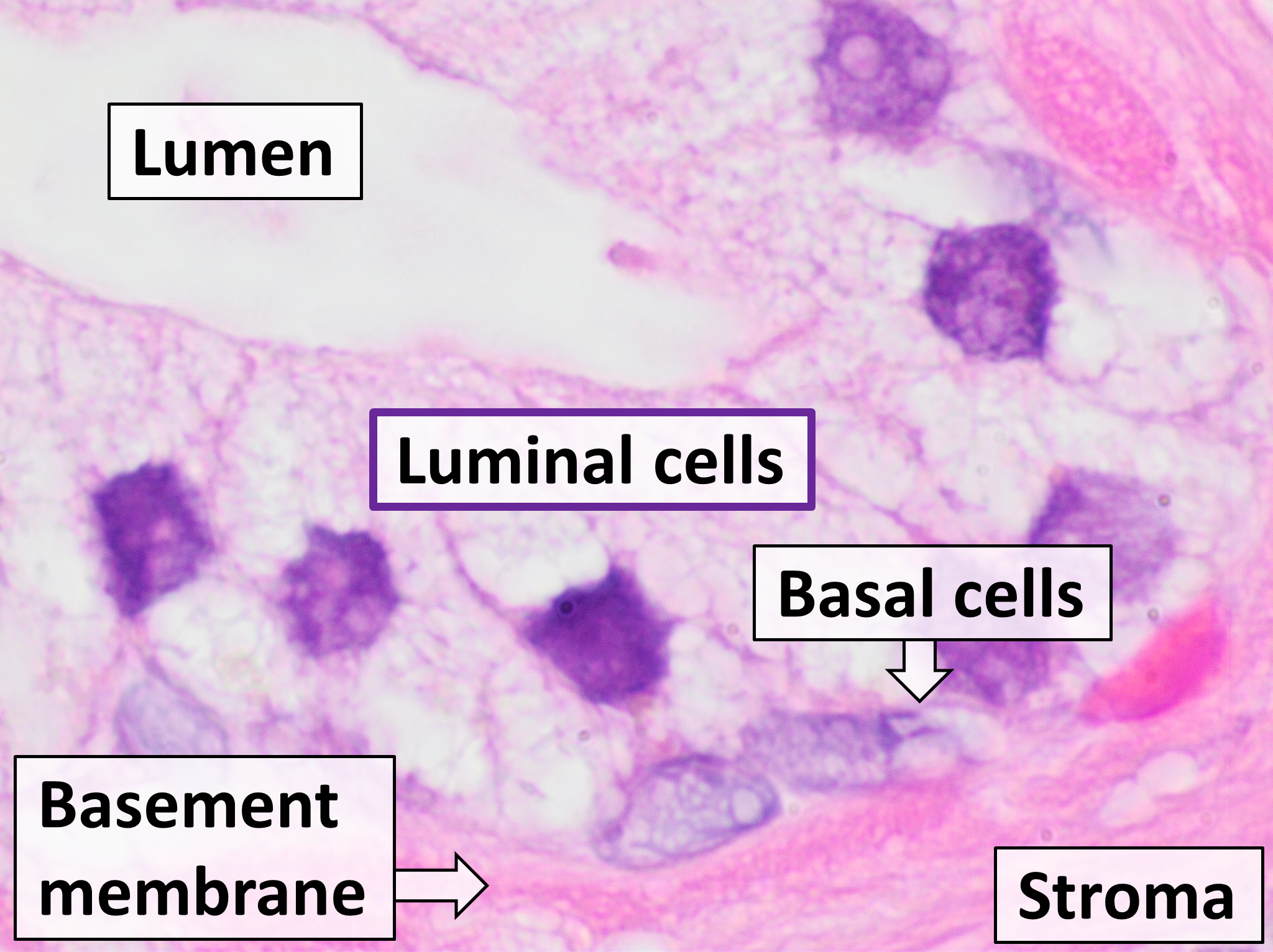
Prostate gland microanatomy, with basement membrane annotated at bottom.

Some diseases result from a poorly functioning basement membrane. The cause can be genetic defects, injuries by the body's own immune system, or other mechanisms. Diseases involving basement membranes at multiple locations include:

- Genetic defects in the collagen fibers of the basement membrane, including Alport syndrome and Knobloch syndrome
- Autoimmune diseases targeting basement membranes. Non-collagenous domain basement membrane collagen type IV is autoantigen (target antigen) of autoantibodies in the autoimmune disease Goodpasture's syndrome.
- A group of diseases stemming from improper function of the basement membrane zone are united under the name epidermolysis bullosa.

In histopathology, thickened basement membranes are found in several inflammatory diseases, such as lichen sclerosus, systemic lupus erythematosus or dermatomyositis in the skin, or collagenous colitis in the colon.

== Evolutionary origin ==
Basement membranes are characteristic of eumetazoans, including diploblastic animals, and have also been identified in homoscleromorph sponges. The homoscleromorph were found to be sister to diploblasts in some studies, making the membrane originate once in the history of life. But more recent studies have disregarded diploblast-homoscleromorph group, so other sponges may have lost it (most probable) or the origin in the two groups may be separate.
