= List of MeSH codes (C17) =

The following is a partial list of the "C" codes for Medical Subject Headings (MeSH), as defined by the United States National Library of Medicine (NLM).

This list continues the information at List of MeSH codes (C16). Codes following these are found at List of MeSH codes (C18). For other MeSH codes, see List of MeSH codes.

The source for this content is the set of 2006 MeSH Trees from the NLM.

== MeSH C17 – skin and connective tissue diseases ==
=== MeSH C17.300 – connective tissue diseases ===
==== MeSH C17.300.182 – cartilage diseases ====
- MeSH C17.300.182.100 – chondromalacia patellae
- MeSH C17.300.182.520 – osteochondritis
- MeSH C17.300.182.531 – polychondritis, relapsing
- MeSH C17.300.182.790 – Tietze syndrome

==== MeSH C17.300.200 – collagen diseases ====
- MeSH C17.300.200.310 – Ehlers–Danlos syndrome
- MeSH C17.300.200.425 – keloid
- MeSH C17.300.200.425.125 – acne keloid
- MeSH C17.300.200.495 – necrobiotic disorders
- MeSH C17.300.200.495.380 – granuloma annulare
- MeSH C17.300.200.495.545 – necrobiosis lipoidica
- MeSH C17.300.200.540 – osteogenesis imperfecta

==== MeSH C17.300.475 – lupus erythematosus, cutaneous ====
- MeSH C17.300.475.479 – lupus erythematosus, discoid
- MeSH C17.300.475.479.400 – panniculitis, lupus erythematosus

==== MeSH C17.300.480 – lupus erythematosus, systemic ====
- MeSH C17.300.480.680 – lupus nephritis
- MeSH C17.300.480.750 – lupus vasculitis, central nervous system

==== MeSH C17.300.550 – mucinoses ====
- MeSH C17.300.550.274 – ganglion cysts
- MeSH C17.300.550.550 – mucinosis, follicular
- MeSH C17.300.550.575 – mucopolysaccharidoses
- MeSH C17.300.550.575.640 – mucopolysaccharidosis i
- MeSH C17.300.550.575.645 – mucopolysaccharidosis ii
- MeSH C17.300.550.575.650 – mucopolysaccharidosis iii
- MeSH C17.300.550.575.655 – mucopolysaccharidosis iv
- MeSH C17.300.550.575.670 – mucopolysaccharidosis vi
- MeSH C17.300.550.575.675 – mucopolysaccharidosis vii
- MeSH C17.300.550.590 – myxedema
- MeSH C17.300.550.750 – scleredema adultorum

==== MeSH C17.300.680 – neoplasms, connective tissue ====
- MeSH C17.300.680.540 – myofibroma

==== MeSH C17.300.710 – panniculitis ====
- MeSH C17.300.710.329 – erythema induratum
- MeSH C17.300.710.400 – panniculitis, lupus erythematosus
- MeSH C17.300.710.500 – panniculitis, nodular nonsuppurative
- MeSH C17.300.710.600 – panniculitis, peritoneal

==== MeSH C17.300.775 – rheumatic diseases ====
- MeSH C17.300.775.099 – arthritis, rheumatoid
- MeSH C17.300.775.099.114 – arthritis, juvenile rheumatoid
- MeSH C17.300.775.099.219 – Caplan's syndrome
- MeSH C17.300.775.099.389 – Felty's syndrome
- MeSH C17.300.775.099.683 – rheumatoid nodule
- MeSH C17.300.775.099.774 – Sjögren syndrome
- MeSH C17.300.775.099.856 – spondylitis, ankylosing
- MeSH C17.300.775.099.870 – Still's disease, adult-onset
- MeSH C17.300.775.440 – hyperostosis, sternocostoclavicular
- MeSH C17.300.775.720 – polymyalgia rheumatica

==== MeSH C17.300.799 – scleroderma, systemic ====
- MeSH C17.300.799.602 – scleroderma, diffuse
- MeSH C17.300.799.801 – scleroderma, limited
- MeSH C17.300.799.801.500 – CREST syndrome

=== MeSH C17.800 – skin diseases ===
==== MeSH C17.800.030 – acneiform eruptions ====
- MeSH C17.800.030.030 – acne keloid
- MeSH C17.800.030.150 – acne vulgaris

==== MeSH C17.800.090 – breast diseases ====
- MeSH C17.800.090.249 – breast cyst
- MeSH C17.800.090.500 – breast neoplasms
- MeSH C17.800.090.500.260 – breast neoplasms, male
- MeSH C17.800.090.500.390 – carcinoma, ductal, breast
- MeSH C17.800.090.500.762 – phyllodes tumor
- MeSH C17.800.090.750 – fibrocystic breast disease
- MeSH C17.800.090.875 – gynecomastia
- MeSH C17.800.090.937 – lactation disorders
- MeSH C17.800.090.937.439 – galactorrhea
- MeSH C17.800.090.937.439.500 – Chiari–Frommel syndrome
- MeSH C17.800.090.968 – mastitis

==== MeSH C17.800.120 – cicatrix ====
- MeSH C17.800.120.125 – cicatrix, hypertrophic
- MeSH C17.800.120.425 – keloid
- MeSH C17.800.120.425.125 – acne keloid

==== MeSH C17.800.174 – dermatitis ====
- MeSH C17.800.174.100 – acrodermatitis
- MeSH C17.800.174.193 – dermatitis, atopic
- MeSH C17.800.174.255 – dermatitis, contact
- MeSH C17.800.174.255.100 – dermatitis, allergic contact
- MeSH C17.800.174.255.100.600 – dermatitis, photoallergic
- MeSH C17.800.174.255.100.700 – dermatitis, toxicodendron
- MeSH C17.800.174.255.400 – dermatitis, irritant
- MeSH C17.800.174.255.400.225 – dermatitis, phototoxic
- MeSH C17.800.174.255.400.250 – diaper rash
- MeSH C17.800.174.255.700 – dermatitis, occupational
- MeSH C17.800.174.318 – dermatitis, exfoliative
- MeSH C17.800.174.360 – dermatitis herpetiformis
- MeSH C17.800.174.550 – dermatitis, perioral
- MeSH C17.800.174.580 – dermatitis, seborrheic
- MeSH C17.800.174.600 – drug eruptions
- MeSH C17.800.174.600.350 – epidermal necrolysis, toxic
- MeSH C17.800.174.600.375 – erythema nodosum
- MeSH C17.800.174.600.800 – serum sickness
- MeSH C17.800.174.620 – eczema
- MeSH C17.800.174.620.300 – eczema, dyshidrotic
- MeSH C17.800.174.640 – intertrigo
- MeSH C17.800.174.660 – neurodermatitis
- MeSH C17.800.174.826 – radiodermatitis

==== MeSH C17.800.229 – erythema ====
- MeSH C17.800.229.200 – erythema chronicum migrans
- MeSH C17.800.229.329 – erythema induratum
- MeSH C17.800.229.335 – erythema infectiosum
- MeSH C17.800.229.400 – erythema multiforme
- MeSH C17.800.229.400.683 – Stevens–Johnson syndrome
- MeSH C17.800.229.413 – erythema nodosum
- MeSH C17.800.229.413.800 – Sweet's syndrome

==== MeSH C17.800.257 – exanthema ====
- MeSH C17.800.257.335 – exanthema subitum

==== MeSH C17.800.271 – facial dermatoses ====
- MeSH C17.800.271.125 – acneiform eruptions
- MeSH C17.800.271.125.125 – acne keloid
- MeSH C17.800.271.125.200 – acne vulgaris
- MeSH C17.800.271.250 – dermatitis, perioral

==== MeSH C17.800.321 – foot diseases ====
- MeSH C17.800.321.125 – foot dermatoses
- MeSH C17.800.321.125.500 – tinea pedis
- MeSH C17.800.321.250 – foot ulcer
- MeSH C17.800.321.500 – immersion foot

==== MeSH C17.800.329 – hair diseases ====
- MeSH C17.800.329.500 – folliculitis
- MeSH C17.800.329.500.261 – acne keloid
- MeSH C17.800.329.750 – hirsutism
- MeSH C17.800.329.875 – hypertrichosis
- MeSH C17.800.329.937 – hypotrichosis
- MeSH C17.800.329.937.122 – alopecia
- MeSH C17.800.329.937.122.147 – alopecia areata
- MeSH C17.800.329.937.122.550 – mucinosis, follicular
- MeSH C17.800.329.968 – Menkes kinky hair syndrome

==== MeSH C17.800.428 – keratosis ====
- MeSH C17.800.428.200 – callosities
- MeSH C17.800.428.260 – cholesteatoma
- MeSH C17.800.428.260.300 – cholesteatoma, middle ear
- MeSH C17.800.428.333 – ichthyosis
- MeSH C17.800.428.333.250 – ichthyosiform erythroderma, congenital
- MeSH C17.800.428.333.250.375 – hyperkeratosis, epidermolytic
- MeSH C17.800.428.333.250.410 – ichthyosis, lamellar
- MeSH C17.800.428.333.410 – ichthyosis vulgaris
- MeSH C17.800.428.333.420 – ichthyosis, x-linked
- MeSH C17.800.428.333.723 – Sjögren–Larsson syndrome
- MeSH C17.800.428.435 – keratoderma, palmoplantar
- MeSH C17.800.428.435.440 – keratoderma, palmoplantar, diffuse
- MeSH C17.800.428.435.600 – Papillon–Lefèvre disease
- MeSH C17.800.428.452 – keratosis follicularis
- MeSH C17.800.428.580 – keratosis, seborrheic
- MeSH C17.800.428.736 – parakeratosis
- MeSH C17.800.428.750 – porokeratosis

==== MeSH C17.800.480 – lupus erythematosus, cutaneous ====
- MeSH C17.800.480.479 – lupus erythematosus, discoid
- MeSH C17.800.480.479.400 – panniculitis, lupus erythematosus

==== MeSH C17.800.508 – mastocytosis ====
- MeSH C17.800.508.236 – mastocytoma
- MeSH C17.800.508.473 – mastocytosis, cutaneous
- MeSH C17.800.508.473.500 – urticaria pigmentosa

==== MeSH C17.800.529 – nail diseases ====
- MeSH C17.800.529.400 – nail–patella syndrome
- MeSH C17.800.529.406 – nails, ingrown
- MeSH C17.800.529.506 – nails, malformed
- MeSH C17.800.529.550 – onychomycosis
- MeSH C17.800.529.639 – paronychia

==== MeSH C17.800.550 – necrobiotic disorders ====
- MeSH C17.800.550.380 – granuloma annulare
- MeSH C17.800.550.545 – necrobiosis lipoidica

==== MeSH C17.800.566 – panniculitis ====
- MeSH C17.800.566.329 – erythema induratum
- MeSH C17.800.566.400 – panniculitis, lupus erythematosus
- MeSH C17.800.566.500 – panniculitis, nodular nonsuppurative

==== MeSH C17.800.600 – photosensitivity disorders ====
- MeSH C17.800.600.325 – dermatitis, photoallergic
- MeSH C17.800.600.335 – dermatitis, phototoxic
- MeSH C17.800.600.425 – hydroa vacciniforme
- MeSH C17.800.600.725 – sunburn
- MeSH C17.800.600.925 – xeroderma pigmentosum

==== MeSH C17.800.621 – pigmentation disorders ====
- MeSH C17.800.621.166 – argyria
- MeSH C17.800.621.250 – Café au lait spots
- MeSH C17.800.621.430 – hyperpigmentation
- MeSH C17.800.621.430.530 – melanosis
- MeSH C17.800.621.430.530.100 – acanthosis nigricans
- MeSH C17.800.621.430.530.550 – lentigo
- MeSH C17.800.621.430.530.550.525 – leopard syndrome
- MeSH C17.800.621.430.530.550.625 – Peutz–Jeghers syndrome
- MeSH C17.800.621.440 – hypopigmentation
- MeSH C17.800.621.440.102 – albinism
- MeSH C17.800.621.440.102.090 – albinism, ocular
- MeSH C17.800.621.440.102.100 – albinism, oculocutaneous
- MeSH C17.800.621.440.102.100.400 – Hermansky–Pudlak syndrome
- MeSH C17.800.621.440.102.600 – piebaldism
- MeSH C17.800.621.440.895 – vitiligo
- MeSH C17.800.621.497 – incontinentia pigmenti
- MeSH C17.800.621.893 – urticaria pigmentosa
- MeSH C17.800.621.936 – xeroderma pigmentosum

==== MeSH C17.800.685 – pruritus ====
- MeSH C17.800.685.544 – pruritus ani
- MeSH C17.800.685.710 – pruritus vulvae

==== MeSH C17.800.695 – pyoderma ====
- MeSH C17.800.695.210 – ecthyma
- MeSH C17.800.695.675 – pyoderma gangrenosum

==== MeSH C17.800.716 – rosacea ====
- MeSH C17.800.716.500 – rhinophyma

==== MeSH C17.800.738 – scalp dermatoses ====
- MeSH C17.800.738.708 – tinea capitis
- MeSH C17.800.738.708.708 – tinea favosa

==== MeSH C17.800.784 – scleroderma, systemic ====
- MeSH C17.800.784.602 – scleroderma, diffuse
- MeSH C17.800.784.801 – scleroderma, limited
- MeSH C17.800.784.801.500 – CREST syndrome

==== MeSH C17.800.794 – sebaceous gland diseases ====
- MeSH C17.800.794.111 – acne vulgaris
- MeSH C17.800.794.230 – dermatitis, seborrheic
- MeSH C17.800.794.550 – mucinosis, follicular
- MeSH C17.800.794.650 – rhinophyma
- MeSH C17.800.794.712 – sebaceous gland neoplasms

==== MeSH C17.800.804 – skin abnormalities ====
- MeSH C17.800.804.066 – acrodermatitis
- MeSH C17.800.804.150 – dyskeratosis congenita
- MeSH C17.800.804.350 – ectodermal dysplasia
- MeSH C17.800.804.350.398 – Ellis–van Creveld syndrome
- MeSH C17.800.804.350.424 – focal dermal hypoplasia
- MeSH C17.800.804.350.712 – neurocutaneous syndromes
- MeSH C17.800.804.428 – Ehlers–Danlos syndrome
- MeSH C17.800.804.493 – epidermolysis bullosa
- MeSH C17.800.804.493.080 – epidermolysis bullosa acquisita
- MeSH C17.800.804.493.160 – epidermolysis bullosa dystrophica
- MeSH C17.800.804.493.170 – epidermolysis bullosa, junctional
- MeSH C17.800.804.493.180 – epidermolysis bullosa simplex
- MeSH C17.800.804.512 – ichthyosis
- MeSH C17.800.804.512.400 – ichthyosiform erythroderma, congenital
- MeSH C17.800.804.512.400.375 – hyperkeratosis, epidermolytic
- MeSH C17.800.804.512.400.410 – ichthyosis, lamellar
- MeSH C17.800.804.512.410 – ichthyosis vulgaris
- MeSH C17.800.804.512.420 – ichthyosis, x-linked
- MeSH C17.800.804.512.723 – Sjögren–Larsson syndrome
- MeSH C17.800.804.580 – incontinentia pigmenti
- MeSH C17.800.804.675 – port-wine stain
- MeSH C17.800.804.766 – pseudoxanthoma elasticum
- MeSH C17.800.804.775 – Rothmund–Thomson syndrome
- MeSH C17.800.804.812 – sclerema neonatorum
- MeSH C17.800.804.936 – xeroderma pigmentosum

==== MeSH C17.800.815 – skin diseases, eczematous ====
- MeSH C17.800.815.193 – dermatitis, atopic
- MeSH C17.800.815.255 – dermatitis, contact
- MeSH C17.800.815.255.100 – dermatitis, allergic contact
- MeSH C17.800.815.255.100.600 – dermatitis, photoallergic
- MeSH C17.800.815.255.100.700 – dermatitis, toxicodendron
- MeSH C17.800.815.255.400 – dermatitis, irritant
- MeSH C17.800.815.255.400.225 – dermatitis, phototoxic
- MeSH C17.800.815.255.400.250 – diaper rash
- MeSH C17.800.815.255.700 – dermatitis, occupational
- MeSH C17.800.815.318 – dermatitis, exfoliative
- MeSH C17.800.815.580 – dermatitis, seborrheic
- MeSH C17.800.815.620 – eczema
- MeSH C17.800.815.620.300 – eczema, dyshidrotic
- MeSH C17.800.815.650 – intertrigo
- MeSH C17.800.815.660 – neurodermatitis

==== MeSH C17.800.827 – skin diseases, genetic ====
- MeSH C17.800.827.080 – albinism
- MeSH C17.800.827.080.090 – albinism, ocular
- MeSH C17.800.827.080.100 – albinism, oculocutaneous
- MeSH C17.800.827.080.100.400 – Hermansky–Pudlak syndrome
- MeSH C17.800.827.080.600 – piebaldism
- MeSH C17.800.827.180 – cutis laxa
- MeSH C17.800.827.210 – dermatitis, atopic
- MeSH C17.800.827.235 – dyskeratosis congenita
- MeSH C17.800.827.250 – ectodermal dysplasia
- MeSH C17.800.827.250.398 – Ellis–van Creveld syndrome
- MeSH C17.800.827.250.424 – focal dermal hypoplasia
- MeSH C17.800.827.250.712 – neurocutaneous syndromes
- MeSH C17.800.827.260 – Ehlers–Danlos syndrome
- MeSH C17.800.827.275 – epidermolysis bullosa
- MeSH C17.800.827.275.080 – epidermolysis bullosa acquisita
- MeSH C17.800.827.275.160 – epidermolysis bullosa dystrophica
- MeSH C17.800.827.275.170 – epidermolysis bullosa, junctional
- MeSH C17.800.827.275.180 – epidermolysis bullosa simplex
- MeSH C17.800.827.400 – ichthyosiform erythroderma, congenital
- MeSH C17.800.827.400.375 – hyperkeratosis, epidermolytic
- MeSH C17.800.827.400.410 – ichthyosis, lamellar
- MeSH C17.800.827.405 – ichthyosis vulgaris
- MeSH C17.800.827.408 – ichthyosis, x-linked
- MeSH C17.800.827.420 – incontinentia pigmenti
- MeSH C17.800.827.475 – keratoderma, palmoplantar
- MeSH C17.800.827.475.440 – keratoderma, palmoplantar, diffuse
- MeSH C17.800.827.475.600 – Papillon–Lefèvre disease
- MeSH C17.800.827.490 – keratosis follicularis
- MeSH C17.800.827.700 – pemphigus, benign familial
- MeSH C17.800.827.730 – porokeratosis
- MeSH C17.800.827.738 – porphyria, erythropoietic
- MeSH C17.800.827.742 – porphyrias, hepatic
- MeSH C17.800.827.742.074 – coproporphyria, hereditary
- MeSH C17.800.827.742.150 – porphyria, acute intermittent
- MeSH C17.800.827.742.250 – porphyria cutanea tarda
- MeSH C17.800.827.742.437 – porphyria, hepatoerythropoietic
- MeSH C17.800.827.742.625 – porphyria, variegate
- MeSH C17.800.827.742.812 – protoporphyria, erythropoietic
- MeSH C17.800.827.750 – pseudoxanthoma elasticum
- MeSH C17.800.827.775 – Rothmund–Thomson syndrome
- MeSH C17.800.827.820 – Sjögren–Larsson syndrome
- MeSH C17.800.827.970 – xeroderma pigmentosum

==== MeSH C17.800.838 – skin diseases, infectious ====
- MeSH C17.800.838.208 – dermatomycoses
- MeSH C17.800.838.208.055 – blastomycosis
- MeSH C17.800.838.208.165 – candidiasis, chronic mucocutaneous
- MeSH C17.800.838.208.170 – candidiasis, cutaneous
- MeSH C17.800.838.208.241 – chromoblastomycosis
- MeSH C17.800.838.208.557 – maduromycosis
- MeSH C17.800.838.208.600 – paracoccidioidomycosis
- MeSH C17.800.838.208.675 – sporotrichosis
- MeSH C17.800.838.208.883 – tinea
- MeSH C17.800.838.208.883.458 – onychomycosis
- MeSH C17.800.838.208.883.558 – tinea capitis
- MeSH C17.800.838.208.883.558.708 – tinea favosa
- MeSH C17.800.838.208.883.658 – tinea pedis
- MeSH C17.800.838.208.941 – tinea versicolor
- MeSH C17.800.838.486 – paronychia
- MeSH C17.800.838.765 – skin diseases, bacterial
- MeSH C17.800.838.765.110 – actinomycosis, cervicofacial
- MeSH C17.800.838.765.150 – angiomatosis, bacillary
- MeSH C17.800.838.765.210 – ecthyma
- MeSH C17.800.838.765.260 – erysipelas
- MeSH C17.800.838.765.310 – erythema chronicum migrans
- MeSH C17.800.838.765.320 – erythrasma
- MeSH C17.800.838.765.360 – granuloma inguinale
- MeSH C17.800.838.765.420 – hidradenitis suppurativa
- MeSH C17.800.838.765.557 – maduromycosis
- MeSH C17.800.838.765.630 – pinta
- MeSH C17.800.838.765.705 – rhinoscleroma
- MeSH C17.800.838.765.770 – staphylococcal skin infections
- MeSH C17.800.838.765.770.270 – furunculosis
- MeSH C17.800.838.765.770.270.200 – carbuncle
- MeSH C17.800.838.765.770.360 – impetigo
- MeSH C17.800.838.765.770.770 – staphylococcal scalded skin syndrome
- MeSH C17.800.838.765.790 – syphilis, cutaneous
- MeSH C17.800.838.765.820 – tuberculosis, cutaneous
- MeSH C17.800.838.765.820.320 – erythema induratum
- MeSH C17.800.838.765.820.470 – lupus
- MeSH C17.800.838.765.910 – yaws
- MeSH C17.800.838.775 – skin diseases, parasitic
- MeSH C17.800.838.775.424 – larva migrans
- MeSH C17.800.838.775.560 – leishmaniasis
- MeSH C17.800.838.775.560.400 – leishmaniasis, cutaneous
- MeSH C17.800.838.775.560.400.350 – leishmaniasis, diffuse cutaneous
- MeSH C17.800.838.775.560.400.385 – leishmaniasis, mucocutaneous
- MeSH C17.800.838.775.580 – lice infestations
- MeSH C17.800.838.775.690 – onchocerciasis
- MeSH C17.800.838.775.800 – scabies
- MeSH C17.800.838.790 – skin diseases, viral
- MeSH C17.800.838.790.260 – erythema infectiosum
- MeSH C17.800.838.790.290 – exanthema subitum
- MeSH C17.800.838.790.320 – herpes simplex
- MeSH C17.800.838.790.320.320 – herpes labialis
- MeSH C17.800.838.790.320.410 – kaposi varicelliform eruption
- MeSH C17.800.838.790.550 – molluscum contagiosum
- MeSH C17.800.838.790.810 – warts
- MeSH C17.800.838.790.810.110 – condylomata acuminata
- MeSH C17.800.838.790.810.260 – epidermodysplasia verruciformis

==== MeSH C17.800.849 – skin diseases, metabolic ====
- MeSH C17.800.849.077 – adiposis dolorosa
- MeSH C17.800.849.391 – lipodystrophy
- MeSH C17.800.849.391.280 – diabetes mellitus, lipoatrophic
- MeSH C17.800.849.391.400 – HIV-associated lipodystrophy
- MeSH C17.800.849.495 – necrobiosis lipoidica
- MeSH C17.800.849.617 – porphyrias
- MeSH C17.800.849.617.250 – porphyria, erythropoietic
- MeSH C17.800.849.617.400 – porphyrias, hepatic
- MeSH C17.800.849.617.400.074 – coproporphyria, hereditary
- MeSH C17.800.849.617.400.150 – porphyria, acute intermittent
- MeSH C17.800.849.617.400.250 – porphyria cutanea tarda
- MeSH C17.800.849.617.400.437 – porphyria, hepatoerythropoietic
- MeSH C17.800.849.617.400.625 – porphyria, variegate
- MeSH C17.800.849.617.400.812 – protoporphyria, erythropoietic
- MeSH C17.800.849.866 – xanthogranuloma, juvenile
- MeSH C17.800.849.929 – xanthomatosis
- MeSH C17.800.849.929.950 – Wolman disease
- MeSH C17.800.849.929.975 – xanthomatosis, cerebrotendinous

==== MeSH C17.800.859 – skin diseases, papulosquamous ====
- MeSH C17.800.859.350 – dermatitis, seborrheic
- MeSH C17.800.859.475 – lichenoid eruptions
- MeSH C17.800.859.475.545 – lichen nitidus
- MeSH C17.800.859.475.560 – lichen planus
- MeSH C17.800.859.475.560.397 – lichen planus, oral
- MeSH C17.800.859.475.605 – lichen sclerosus et atrophicus
- MeSH C17.800.859.475.650 – pityriasis lichenoides
- MeSH C17.800.859.475.650.580 – lymphomatoid papulosis
- MeSH C17.800.859.575 – parapsoriasis
- MeSH C17.800.859.575.650 – pityriasis lichenoides
- MeSH C17.800.859.575.650.580 – lymphomatoid papulosis
- MeSH C17.800.859.600 – pityriasis
- MeSH C17.800.859.600.650 – pityriasis lichenoides
- MeSH C17.800.859.600.650.580 – lymphomatoid papulosis
- MeSH C17.800.859.600.675 – pityriasis rosea
- MeSH C17.800.859.600.685 – pityriasis rubra pilaris
- MeSH C17.800.859.675 – psoriasis
- MeSH C17.800.859.675.175 – arthritis, psoriatic

==== MeSH C17.800.862 – skin diseases, vascular ====
- MeSH C17.800.862.060 – angiomatosis, bacillary
- MeSH C17.800.862.150 – Behçet syndrome
- MeSH C17.800.862.560 – mucocutaneous lymph node syndrome
- MeSH C17.800.862.625 – polyarteritis nodosa
- MeSH C17.800.862.675 – pyoderma gangrenosum
- MeSH C17.800.862.775 – Sneddon syndrome
- MeSH C17.800.862.875 – Takayasu's arteritis
- MeSH C17.800.862.892 – temporal arteritis
- MeSH C17.800.862.945 – urticaria
- MeSH C17.800.862.945.066 – angioneurotic edema
- MeSH C17.800.862.952 – vasculitis, allergic cutaneous

==== MeSH C17.800.865 – skin diseases, vesiculobullous ====
- MeSH C17.800.865.070 – acantholysis
- MeSH C17.800.865.187 – blister
- MeSH C17.800.865.360 – dermatitis herpetiformis
- MeSH C17.800.865.385 – eczema, dyshidrotic
- MeSH C17.800.865.410 – epidermolysis bullosa
- MeSH C17.800.865.410.080 – epidermolysis bullosa acquisita
- MeSH C17.800.865.410.160 – epidermolysis bullosa dystrophica
- MeSH C17.800.865.410.170 – epidermolysis bullosa, junctional
- MeSH C17.800.865.410.180 – epidermolysis bullosa simplex
- MeSH C17.800.865.475 – erythema multiforme
- MeSH C17.800.865.475.683 – Stevens–Johnson syndrome
- MeSH C17.800.865.575 – hydroa vacciniforme
- MeSH C17.800.865.670 – pemphigoid, benign mucous membrane
- MeSH C17.800.865.690 – pemphigoid, bullous
- MeSH C17.800.865.700 – pemphigoid gestationis
- MeSH C17.800.865.716 – pemphigus
- MeSH C17.800.865.716.700 – pemphigus, benign familial

==== MeSH C17.800.882 – skin neoplasms ====
- MeSH C17.800.882.712 – sebaceous gland neoplasms
- MeSH C17.800.882.743 – sweat gland neoplasms

==== MeSH C17.800.893 – skin ulcer ====
- MeSH C17.800.893.592 – leg ulcer
- MeSH C17.800.893.592.450 – foot ulcer
- MeSH C17.800.893.592.450.200 – diabetic foot
- MeSH C17.800.893.592.730 – varicose ulcer
- MeSH C17.800.893.665 – pressure ulcer
- MeSH C17.800.893.675 – pyoderma gangrenosum

==== MeSH C17.800.946 – sweat gland diseases ====
- MeSH C17.800.946.315 – hidradenitis
- MeSH C17.800.946.315.320 – hidradenitis suppurativa
- MeSH C17.800.946.350 – hyperhidrosis
- MeSH C17.800.946.350.843 – sweating, gustatory
- MeSH C17.800.946.370 – hypohidrosis
- MeSH C17.800.946.492 – miliaria
- MeSH C17.800.946.492.285 – Fox–Fordyce disease
- MeSH C17.800.946.743 – sweat gland neoplasms

The list continues at List of MeSH codes (C18).
