= List of MeSH codes (C16) =

The following is a partial list of the "C" codes for Medical Subject Headings (MeSH), as defined by the United States National Library of Medicine (NLM).

This list continues the information at List of MeSH codes (C15). Codes following these are found at List of MeSH codes (C17). For other MeSH codes, see List of MeSH codes.

The source for this content is the set of 2006 MeSH Trees from the NLM.

== MeSH C16 – congenital, hereditary, and neonatal diseases and abnormalities ==
=== MeSH C16.131 – abnormalities ===
==== MeSH C16.131.077 – abnormalities, multiple ====
- MeSH C16.131.077.065 – Alagille syndrome
- MeSH C16.131.077.095 – Angelman syndrome
- MeSH C16.131.077.112 – Bardet–Biedl syndrome
- MeSH C16.131.077.130 – basal-cell nevus syndrome
- MeSH C16.131.077.133 – Beckwith–Wiedemann syndrome
- MeSH C16.131.077.137 – Bloom syndrome
- MeSH C16.131.077.208 – branchio-oto-renal syndrome
- MeSH C16.131.077.250 – Cockayne syndrome
- MeSH C16.131.077.262 – cri du chat syndrome
- MeSH C16.131.077.272 – De Lange syndrome
- MeSH C16.131.077.327 – Down syndrome
- MeSH C16.131.077.350 – ectodermal dysplasia
- MeSH C16.131.077.350.398 – Ellis–van Creveld syndrome
- MeSH C16.131.077.350.424 – focal dermal hypoplasia
- MeSH C16.131.077.350.712 – neurocutaneous syndromes
- MeSH C16.131.077.393 – Gardner's syndrome
- MeSH C16.131.077.410 – holoprosencephaly
- MeSH C16.131.077.445 – incontinentia pigmenti
- MeSH C16.131.077.509 – Laurence–Moon syndrome
- MeSH C16.131.077.525 – Leopard syndrome
- MeSH C16.131.077.550 – Marfan syndrome
- MeSH C16.131.077.578 – Möbius syndrome
- MeSH C16.131.077.606 – nail–patella syndrome
- MeSH C16.131.077.661 – oculocerebrorenal syndrome
- MeSH C16.131.077.677 – orofaciodigital syndromes
- MeSH C16.131.077.703 – POEMS syndrome
- MeSH C16.131.077.730 – Prader–Willi syndrome
- MeSH C16.131.077.740 – proteus syndrome
- MeSH C16.131.077.745 – prune belly syndrome
- MeSH C16.131.077.790 – rubella syndrome, congenital
- MeSH C16.131.077.804 – Rubinstein–Taybi syndrome
- MeSH C16.131.077.850 – Short rib – polydactyly syndrome
- MeSH C16.131.077.860 – Smith–Lemli–Opitz syndrome
- MeSH C16.131.077.938 – Waardenburg syndrome
- MeSH C16.131.077.951 – Wolfram syndrome
- MeSH C16.131.077.970 – Zellweger syndrome

==== MeSH C16.131.240 – cardiovascular abnormalities ====
- MeSH C16.131.240.110 – arterio-arterial fistula
- MeSH C16.131.240.150 – arteriovenous malformations
- MeSH C16.131.240.150.125 – arteriovenous fistula
- MeSH C16.131.240.150.295 – intracranial arteriovenous malformations
- MeSH C16.131.240.275 – central nervous system vascular malformations
- MeSH C16.131.240.400 – heart defects, congenital
- MeSH C16.131.240.400.090 – aortic coarctation
- MeSH C16.131.240.400.145 – arrhythmogenic right ventricular dysplasia
- MeSH C16.131.240.400.200 – cor triatriatum
- MeSH C16.131.240.400.210 – coronary vessel anomalies
- MeSH C16.131.240.400.220 – crisscross heart
- MeSH C16.131.240.400.280 – dextrocardia
- MeSH C16.131.240.400.280.500 – Kartagener syndrome
- MeSH C16.131.240.400.340 – ductus arteriosus, patent
- MeSH C16.131.240.400.395 – Ebstein's anomaly
- MeSH C16.131.240.400.450 – Eisenmenger complex
- MeSH C16.131.240.400.560 – heart septal defects
- MeSH C16.131.240.400.560.098 – aortopulmonary septal defect
- MeSH C16.131.240.400.560.350 – endocardial cushion defects
- MeSH C16.131.240.400.560.375 – heart septal defects, atrial
- MeSH C16.131.240.400.560.375.518 – Lutembacher's syndrome
- MeSH C16.131.240.400.560.375.702 – Trilogy of Fallot
- MeSH C16.131.240.400.560.540 – heart septal defects, ventricular
- MeSH C16.131.240.400.625 – hypoplastic left heart syndrome
- MeSH C16.131.240.400.685 – Leopard syndrome
- MeSH C16.131.240.400.701 – levocardia
- MeSH C16.131.240.400.720 – Marfan syndrome
- MeSH C16.131.240.400.849 – Tetralogy of Fallot
- MeSH C16.131.240.400.915 – transposition of great vessels
- MeSH C16.131.240.400.915.300 – double outlet right ventricle
- MeSH C16.131.240.400.920 – tricuspid atresia
- MeSH C16.131.240.400.929 – truncus arteriosus, persistent
- MeSH C16.131.240.670 – pulmonary atresia
- MeSH C16.131.240.700 – scimitar syndrome

==== MeSH C16.131.260 – chromosome disorders ====
- MeSH C16.131.260.040 – Angelman syndrome
- MeSH C16.131.260.080 – Beckwith–Wiedemann syndrome
- MeSH C16.131.260.090 – branchio-oto-renal syndrome
- MeSH C16.131.260.190 – cri du chat syndrome
- MeSH C16.131.260.210 – De Lange syndrome
- MeSH C16.131.260.260 – Down syndrome
- MeSH C16.131.260.380 – holoprosencephaly
- MeSH C16.131.260.700 – Prader–Willi syndrome
- MeSH C16.131.260.790 – Rubinstein–Taybi syndrome
- MeSH C16.131.260.800 – sex chromosome disorders
- MeSH C16.131.260.800.240 – ectodermal dysplasia
- MeSH C16.131.260.800.240.350 – focal dermal hypoplasia
- MeSH C16.131.260.800.300 – fragile X syndrome
- MeSH C16.131.260.800.340 – gonadal dysgenesis, 46,xy
- MeSH C16.131.260.800.345 – gonadal dysgenesis, mixed
- MeSH C16.131.260.800.490 – Klinefelter syndrome
- MeSH C16.131.260.800.670 – orofaciodigital syndromes
- MeSH C16.131.260.800.870 – Turner syndrome
- MeSH C16.131.260.940 – WAGR syndrome
- MeSH C16.131.260.970 – Williams syndrome

==== MeSH C16.131.314 – digestive system abnormalities ====
- MeSH C16.131.314.094 – anus, imperforate
- MeSH C16.131.314.125 – biliary atresia
- MeSH C16.131.314.184 – choledochal cyst
- MeSH C16.131.314.184.500 – Caroli disease
- MeSH C16.131.314.244 – diaphragmatic eventration
- MeSH C16.131.314.330 – esophageal atresia
- MeSH C16.131.314.439 – Hirschsprung's disease
- MeSH C16.131.314.466 – intestinal atresia
- MeSH C16.131.314.556 – Meckel's diverticulum

==== MeSH C16.131.384 – eye abnormalities ====
- MeSH C16.131.384.079 – aniridia
- MeSH C16.131.384.079.950 – WAGR syndrome
- MeSH C16.131.384.159 – anophthalmos
- MeSH C16.131.384.190 – blepharophimosis
- MeSH C16.131.384.282 – coloboma
- MeSH C16.131.384.405 – ectopia lentis
- MeSH C16.131.384.480 – hydrophthalmos
- MeSH C16.131.384.666 – microphthalmos
- MeSH C16.131.384.784 – retinal dysplasia

==== MeSH C16.131.482 – lymphatic abnormalities ====
- MeSH C16.131.482.500 – lymphangiectasis, intestinal

==== MeSH C16.131.581 – monsters ====
- MeSH C16.131.581.197 – anencephaly
- MeSH C16.131.581.806 – twins, conjoined

==== MeSH C16.131.621 – musculoskeletal abnormalities ====
- MeSH C16.131.621.077 – arthrogryposis
- MeSH C16.131.621.207 – craniofacial abnormalities
- MeSH C16.131.621.207.207 – cleidocranial dysplasia
- MeSH C16.131.621.207.231 – craniofacial dysostosis
- MeSH C16.131.621.207.231.427 – Hallermann's syndrome
- MeSH C16.131.621.207.231.480 – hypertelorism
- MeSH C16.131.621.207.231.576 – mandibulofacial dysostosis
- MeSH C16.131.621.207.231.576.410 – goldenhar syndrome
- MeSH C16.131.621.207.240 – craniosynostoses
- MeSH C16.131.621.207.240.100 – acrocephalosyndactylia
- MeSH C16.131.621.207.410 – holoprosencephaly
- MeSH C16.131.621.207.525 – Leopard syndrome
- MeSH C16.131.621.207.540 – maxillofacial abnormalities
- MeSH C16.131.621.207.540.170 – cherubism
- MeSH C16.131.621.207.540.460 – jaw abnormalities
- MeSH C16.131.621.207.540.460.185 – cleft palate
- MeSH C16.131.621.207.540.460.457 – micrognathism
- MeSH C16.131.621.207.540.460.606 – Pierre Robin syndrome
- MeSH C16.131.621.207.540.460.655 – prognathism
- MeSH C16.131.621.207.540.460.813 – retrognathism
- MeSH C16.131.621.207.620 – microcephaly
- MeSH C16.131.621.207.690 – Noonan syndrome
- MeSH C16.131.621.207.700 – orofaciodigital syndromes
- MeSH C16.131.621.207.715 – plagiocephaly, nonsynostotic
- MeSH C16.131.621.207.720 – platybasia
- MeSH C16.131.621.207.850 – Rubinstein–Taybi syndrome
- MeSH C16.131.621.386 – funnel chest
- MeSH C16.131.621.417 – gastroschisis
- MeSH C16.131.621.445 – Hajdu–Cheney syndrome
- MeSH C16.131.621.449 – hip dislocation, congenital
- MeSH C16.131.621.551 – Klippel–Feil syndrome
- MeSH C16.131.621.585 – limb deformities, congenital
- MeSH C16.131.621.585.350 – ectromelia
- MeSH C16.131.621.585.380 – foot deformities, congenital
- MeSH C16.131.621.585.425 – hand deformities, congenital
- MeSH C16.131.621.585.512 – lower extremity deformities, congenital
- MeSH C16.131.621.585.600 – polydactyly
- MeSH C16.131.621.585.600.750 – short rib – polydactyly syndrome
- MeSH C16.131.621.585.620 – proteus syndrome
- MeSH C16.131.621.585.800 – syndactyly
- MeSH C16.131.621.585.800.100 – acrocephalosyndactylia
- MeSH C16.131.621.585.800.756 – Poland syndrome
- MeSH C16.131.621.585.984 – thanatophoric dysplasia
- MeSH C16.131.621.585.988 – upper extremity deformities, congenital
- MeSH C16.131.621.906 – synostosis
- MeSH C16.131.621.906.364 – craniosynostoses
- MeSH C16.131.621.906.364.100 – acrocephalosyndactylia
- MeSH C16.131.621.906.819 – syndactyly
- MeSH C16.131.621.906.819.100 – acrocephalosyndactylia
- MeSH C16.131.621.906.819.756 – Poland syndrome

==== MeSH C16.131.666 – nervous system malformations ====
- MeSH C16.131.666.142 – central nervous system cyst
- MeSH C16.131.666.142.100 – arachnoid cyst
- MeSH C16.131.666.190 – central nervous system vascular malformations
- MeSH C16.131.666.190.200 – hemangioma, cavernous, central nervous system
- MeSH C16.131.666.190.600 – central nervous system venous angioma
- MeSH C16.131.666.190.800 – sinus pericranii
- MeSH C16.131.666.205 – Dandy–Walker syndrome
- MeSH C16.131.666.300 – hereditary motor and sensory neuropathies
- MeSH C16.131.666.300.200 – Charcot–Marie–Tooth disease
- MeSH C16.131.666.300.780 – Refsum disease
- MeSH C16.131.666.300.820 – spastic paraplegia, hereditary
- MeSH C16.131.666.310 – hereditary sensory and autonomic neuropathies
- MeSH C16.131.666.310.309 – dysautonomia, familial
- MeSH C16.131.666.410 – holoprosencephaly
- MeSH C16.131.666.450 – hydranencephaly
- MeSH C16.131.666.460 – intracranial arteriovenous malformations
- MeSH C16.131.666.680 – neural tube defects
- MeSH C16.131.666.680.196 – anencephaly
- MeSH C16.131.666.680.291 – Arnold–Chiari malformation
- MeSH C16.131.666.680.488 – encephalocele
- MeSH C16.131.666.680.598 – meningocele
- MeSH C16.131.666.680.610 – meningomyelocele
- MeSH C16.131.666.680.800 – spinal dysraphism
- MeSH C16.131.666.680.800.730 – spina bifida cystica
- MeSH C16.131.666.680.800.750 – spina bifida occulta
- MeSH C16.131.666.845 – septo-optic dysplasia

==== MeSH C16.131.740 – respiratory system abnormalities ====
- MeSH C16.131.740.195 – bronchogenic cyst
- MeSH C16.131.740.214 – bronchopulmonary sequestration
- MeSH C16.131.740.271 – choanal atresia
- MeSH C16.131.740.290 – cystic adenomatoid malformation of lung, congenital
- MeSH C16.131.740.501 – kartagener syndrome
- MeSH C16.131.740.815 – scimitar syndrome
- MeSH C16.131.740.830 – tracheobronchomegaly

==== MeSH C16.131.810 – situs inversus ====
- MeSH C16.131.810.250 – dextrocardia
- MeSH C16.131.810.250.500 – kartagener syndrome
- MeSH C16.131.810.700 – levocardia

==== MeSH C16.131.831 – skin abnormalities ====
- MeSH C16.131.831.066 – acrodermatitis
- MeSH C16.131.831.150 – dyskeratosis congenita
- MeSH C16.131.831.350 – ectodermal dysplasia
- MeSH C16.131.831.350.398 – Ellis–van Creveld syndrome
- MeSH C16.131.831.350.424 – focal dermal hypoplasia
- MeSH C16.131.831.350.712 – neurocutaneous syndromes
- MeSH C16.131.831.428 – Ehlers–Danlos syndrome
- MeSH C16.131.831.493 – epidermolysis bullosa
- MeSH C16.131.831.493.080 – epidermolysis bullosa acquisita
- MeSH C16.131.831.493.160 – epidermolysis bullosa dystrophica
- MeSH C16.131.831.493.170 – epidermolysis bullosa, junctional
- MeSH C16.131.831.493.180 – epidermolysis bullosa simplex
- MeSH C16.131.831.512 – ichthyosis
- MeSH C16.131.831.512.400 – ichthyosiform erythroderma, congenital
- MeSH C16.131.831.512.400.375 – hyperkeratosis, epidermolytic
- MeSH C16.131.831.512.400.410 – ichthyosis, lamellar
- MeSH C16.131.831.512.410 – ichthyosis vulgaris
- MeSH C16.131.831.512.420 – ichthyosis, x-linked
- MeSH C16.131.831.512.723 – Sjögren–Larsson syndrome
- MeSH C16.131.831.580 – incontinentia pigmenti
- MeSH C16.131.831.675 – port-wine stain
- MeSH C16.131.831.766 – pseudoxanthoma elasticum
- MeSH C16.131.831.775 – Rothmund–Thomson syndrome
- MeSH C16.131.831.812 – sclerema neonatorum
- MeSH C16.131.831.936 – xeroderma pigmentosum

==== MeSH C16.131.850 – stomatognathic system abnormalities ====
- MeSH C16.131.850.500 – maxillofacial abnormalities
- MeSH C16.131.850.500.460 – jaw abnormalities
- MeSH C16.131.850.500.460.185 – cleft palate
- MeSH C16.131.850.500.460.457 – micrognathism
- MeSH C16.131.850.500.460.606 – Pierre Robin syndrome
- MeSH C16.131.850.500.460.655 – prognathism
- MeSH C16.131.850.500.460.813 – retrognathism
- MeSH C16.131.850.525 – mouth abnormalities
- MeSH C16.131.850.525.164 – cleft lip
- MeSH C16.131.850.525.185 – cleft palate
- MeSH C16.131.850.525.304 – fibromatosis, gingival
- MeSH C16.131.850.525.480 – macrostomia
- MeSH C16.131.850.525.520 – microstomia
- MeSH C16.131.850.525.955 – velopharyngeal insufficiency
- MeSH C16.131.850.800 – tooth abnormalities
- MeSH C16.131.850.800.065 – amelogenesis imperfecta
- MeSH C16.131.850.800.065.300 – dental enamel hypoplasia
- MeSH C16.131.850.800.100 – anodontia
- MeSH C16.131.850.800.250 – dens in dente
- MeSH C16.131.850.800.260 – dentin dysplasia
- MeSH C16.131.850.800.270 – dentinogenesis imperfecta
- MeSH C16.131.850.800.370 – fused teeth
- MeSH C16.131.850.800.600 – odontodysplasia
- MeSH C16.131.850.800.850 – tooth, supernumerary

==== MeSH C16.131.894 – thyroid dysgenesis ====
- MeSH C16.131.894.500 – lingual thyroid
- MeSH C16.131.894.500.500 – lingual goiter

==== MeSH C16.131.939 – urogenital abnormalities ====
- MeSH C16.131.939.132 – bladder exstrophy
- MeSH C16.131.939.258 – cryptorchidism
- MeSH C16.131.939.374 – epispadias
- MeSH C16.131.939.445 – frasier syndrome
- MeSH C16.131.939.516 – hypospadias
- MeSH C16.131.939.629 – multicystic dysplastic kidney
- MeSH C16.131.939.742 – nephritis, hereditary
- MeSH C16.131.939.842 – sex differentiation disorders
- MeSH C16.131.939.842.260 – freemartinism
- MeSH C16.131.939.842.309 – gonadal dysgenesis
- MeSH C16.131.939.842.309.193 – gonadal dysgenesis, 46,xx
- MeSH C16.131.939.842.309.388 – gonadal dysgenesis, 46,xy
- MeSH C16.131.939.842.309.391 – gonadal dysgenesis, mixed
- MeSH C16.131.939.842.309.872 – turner syndrome
- MeSH C16.131.939.842.316 – hermaphroditism
- MeSH C16.131.939.842.316.313 – hermaphroditism, true
- MeSH C16.131.939.842.316.627 – pseudohermaphroditism
- MeSH C16.131.939.842.316.627.109 – androgen insensitivity syndrome
- MeSH C16.131.939.842.316.627.220 – Denys–Drash syndrome
- MeSH C16.131.939.842.425 – Kallmann syndrome
- MeSH C16.131.939.842.454 – Klinefelter syndrome
- MeSH C16.131.939.921 – WAGR syndrome

=== MeSH C16.300 – fetal diseases ===
==== MeSH C16.300.060 – erythroblastosis, fetal ====
- MeSH C16.300.060.480 – hydrops fetalis

=== MeSH C16.320 – genetic diseases, inborn ===
==== MeSH C16.320.070 – anemia, hemolytic, congenital ====
- MeSH C16.320.070.095 – anemia, dyserythropoietic, congenital
- MeSH C16.320.070.100 – anemia, hemolytic, congenital nonspherocytic
- MeSH C16.320.070.150 – anemia, sickle cell
- MeSH C16.320.070.150.440 – hemoglobin SC disease
- MeSH C16.320.070.150.670 – sickle cell trait
- MeSH C16.320.070.365 – elliptocytosis, hereditary
- MeSH C16.320.070.480 – glucosephosphate dehydrogenase deficiency
- MeSH C16.320.070.480.370 – favism
- MeSH C16.320.070.490 – hemoglobin c disease
- MeSH C16.320.070.785 – spherocytosis, hereditary
- MeSH C16.320.070.875 – thalassemia
- MeSH C16.320.070.875.100 – alpha-thalassemia
- MeSH C16.320.070.875.150 – beta-thalassemia

==== MeSH C16.320.077 – anemia, hypoplastic, congenital ====
- MeSH C16.320.077.090 – anemia, Diamond–Blackfan
- MeSH C16.320.077.280 – fanconi anemia

==== MeSH C16.320.099 – blood coagulation disorders, inherited ====
- MeSH C16.320.099.037 – activated protein C resistance
- MeSH C16.320.099.056 – afibrinogenemia
- MeSH C16.320.099.075 – antithrombin III deficiency
- MeSH C16.320.099.080 – Bernard–Soulier syndrome
- MeSH C16.320.099.300 – factor V deficiency
- MeSH C16.320.099.310 – factor VII deficiency
- MeSH C16.320.099.320 – factor X deficiency
- MeSH C16.320.099.325 – factor XI deficiency
- MeSH C16.320.099.330 – factor XII deficiency
- MeSH C16.320.099.335 – factor XIII deficiency
- MeSH C16.320.099.500 – hemophilia A
- MeSH C16.320.099.510 – hemophilia B
- MeSH C16.320.099.515 – Hermansky–Pudlak syndrome
- MeSH C16.320.099.550 – hypoprothrombinemias
- MeSH C16.320.099.690 – protein C deficiency
- MeSH C16.320.099.820 – thrombasthenia
- MeSH C16.320.099.900 – Von Willebrand disease
- MeSH C16.320.099.970 – Wiskott–Aldrich syndrome

==== MeSH C16.320.180 – chromosome disorders ====
- MeSH C16.320.180.040 – angelman syndrome
- MeSH C16.320.180.080 – Beckwith–Wiedemann syndrome
- MeSH C16.320.180.090 – branchio-oto-renal syndrome
- MeSH C16.320.180.190 – cri du chat syndrome MeSH C16.320.180.210 – De Lange syndrome
- MeSH C16.320.180.260 – Down syndrome
- MeSH C16.320.180.380 – holoprosencephaly
- MeSH C16.320.180.700 – Prader–Willi syndrome
- MeSH C16.320.180.790 – Rubinstein–Taybi syndrome
- MeSH C16.320.180.800 – sex chromosome disorders
- MeSH C16.320.180.800.240 – ectodermal dysplasia
- MeSH C16.320.180.800.240.350 – focal dermal hypoplasia
- MeSH C16.320.180.800.300 – fragile X syndrome
- MeSH C16.320.180.800.340 – gonadal dysgenesis, 46,xy
- MeSH C16.320.180.800.345 – gonadal dysgenesis, mixed
- MeSH C16.320.180.800.490 – Klinefelter syndrome
- MeSH C16.320.180.800.670 – orofaciodigital syndromes
- MeSH C16.320.180.800.870 – Turner syndrome
- MeSH C16.320.180.940 – WAGR syndrome
- MeSH C16.320.180.970 – Williams syndrome

==== MeSH C16.320.240 – dwarfism ====
- MeSH C16.320.240.500 – achondroplasia
- MeSH C16.320.240.562 – cockayne syndrome
- MeSH C16.320.240.625 – congenital hypothyroidism
- MeSH C16.320.240.750 – laron syndrome
- MeSH C16.320.240.875 – mulibrey nanism

==== MeSH C16.320.290 – eye diseases, hereditary ====
- MeSH C16.320.290.040 – albinism
- MeSH C16.320.290.040.090 – albinism, ocular
- MeSH C16.320.290.040.100 – albinism, oculocutaneous
- MeSH C16.320.290.040.100.400 – Hermansky–Pudlak syndrome
- MeSH C16.320.290.040.600 – piebaldism
- MeSH C16.320.290.078 – aniridia
- MeSH C16.320.290.078.950 – WAGR syndrome
- MeSH C16.320.290.142 – choroideremia
- MeSH C16.320.290.162 – corneal dystrophies, hereditary
- MeSH C16.320.290.162.410 – Fuchs' endothelial dystrophy
- MeSH C16.320.290.235 – Duane retraction syndrome
- MeSH C16.320.290.468 – gyrate atrophy
- MeSH C16.320.290.564 – optic atrophies, hereditary
- MeSH C16.320.290.564.400 – optic atrophy, hereditary, leber
- MeSH C16.320.290.564.500 – optic atrophy, autosomal dominant
- MeSH C16.320.290.564.980 – Wolfram syndrome
- MeSH C16.320.290.660 – retinal dysplasia
- MeSH C16.320.290.684 – retinitis pigmentosa
- MeSH C16.320.290.684.500 – Usher syndromes

==== MeSH C16.320.322 – genetic diseases, x-linked ====
- MeSH C16.320.322.061 – androgen insensitivity syndrome
- MeSH C16.320.322.092 – choroideremia
- MeSH C16.320.322.108 – dyskeratosis congenita
- MeSH C16.320.322.124 – fabry disease
- MeSH C16.320.322.186 – focal dermal hypoplasia
- MeSH C16.320.322.201 – glycogen storage disease type IIb
- MeSH C16.320.322.217 – glycogen storage disease type VIII
- MeSH C16.320.322.233 – granulomatous disease, chronic
- MeSH C16.320.322.241 – ichthyosis, x-linked
- MeSH C16.320.322.360 – hemophilia B
- MeSH C16.320.322.500 – mental retardation, x-linked
- MeSH C16.320.322.500.124 – adrenoleukodystrophy
- MeSH C16.320.322.500.249 – Coffin–Lowry syndrome
- MeSH C16.320.322.500.500 – fragile X syndrome
- MeSH C16.320.322.500.625 – Lesch–Nyhan syndrome
- MeSH C16.320.322.500.687 – Menkes kinky hair syndrome
- MeSH C16.320.322.500.750 – mucopolysaccharidosis II
- MeSH C16.320.322.500.875 – pyruvate dehydrogenase complex deficiency disease
- MeSH C16.320.322.500.937 – Rett syndrome
- MeSH C16.320.322.562 – muscular dystrophy, Duchenne
- MeSH C16.320.322.625 – muscular dystrophy, Emery–Dreifuss
- MeSH C16.320.322.750 – oculocerebrorenal syndrome
- MeSH C16.320.322.906 – Pelizaeus–Merzbacher disease
- MeSH C16.320.322.937 – Wiskott–Aldrich syndrome

==== MeSH C16.320.365 – hemoglobinopathies ====
- MeSH C16.320.365.155 – anemia, sickle cell
- MeSH C16.320.365.155.440 – hemoglobin sc disease
- MeSH C16.320.365.155.668 – sickle cell trait
- MeSH C16.320.365.463 – hemoglobin c disease
- MeSH C16.320.365.826 – thalassemia
- MeSH C16.320.365.826.100 – alpha-thalassemia
- MeSH C16.320.365.826.100.350 – hydrops fetalis
- MeSH C16.320.365.826.150 – beta-thalassemia

==== MeSH C16.320.400 – heredodegenerative disorders, nervous system ====
- MeSH C16.320.400.024 – Alexander disease
- MeSH C16.320.400.050 – amyloid neuropathies, familial
- MeSH C16.320.400.150 – Canavan disease
- MeSH C16.320.400.200 – Cockayne syndrome
- MeSH C16.320.400.330 – dystonia musculorum deformans
- MeSH C16.320.400.350 – Gerstmann–Sträussler–Scheinker disease
- MeSH C16.320.400.375 – Hallervorden–Spatz syndrome
- MeSH C16.320.400.387 – hepatolenticular degeneration
- MeSH C16.320.400.393 – hereditary central nervous system demyelinating diseases
- MeSH C16.320.400.400 – hereditary motor and sensory neuropathies
- MeSH C16.320.400.400.200 – Charcot–Marie–Tooth disease
- MeSH C16.320.400.400.780 – Refsum disease
- MeSH C16.320.400.400.820 – spastic paraplegia, hereditary
- MeSH C16.320.400.415 – hereditary sensory and autonomic neuropathies
- MeSH C16.320.400.415.309 – dysautonomia, familial
- MeSH C16.320.400.430 – Huntington disease
- MeSH C16.320.400.480 – Lafora disease
- MeSH C16.320.400.500 – Lesch–Nyhan syndrome
- MeSH C16.320.400.520 – Menkes kinky hair syndrome
- MeSH C16.320.400.525 – mental retardation, x-linked
- MeSH C16.320.400.525.124 – adrenoleukodystrophy
- MeSH C16.320.400.525.249 – Coffin–Lowry syndrome
- MeSH C16.320.400.525.500 – fragile X syndrome
- MeSH C16.320.400.525.625 – Lesch–Nyhan syndrome
- MeSH C16.320.400.525.687 – Menkes kinky hair syndrome
- MeSH C16.320.400.525.750 – mucopolysaccharidosis II
- MeSH C16.320.400.525.875 – pyruvate dehydrogenase complex deficiency disease
- MeSH C16.320.400.525.937 – Rett syndrome
- MeSH C16.320.400.540 – myotonia congenita
- MeSH C16.320.400.542 – myotonic dystrophy
- MeSH C16.320.400.560 – neurofibromatosis
- MeSH C16.320.400.560.400 – neurofibromatosis 1
- MeSH C16.320.400.560.700 – neurofibromatosis 2
- MeSH C16.320.400.600 – neuronal ceroid-lipofuscinosis
- MeSH C16.320.400.630 – optic atrophies, hereditary
- MeSH C16.320.400.630.400 – optic atrophy, hereditary, leber
- MeSH C16.320.400.630.500 – optic atrophy, autosomal dominant
- MeSH C16.320.400.630.980 – Wolfram syndrome
- MeSH C16.320.400.700 – Rett syndrome
- MeSH C16.320.400.765 – spinal muscular atrophies of childhood
- MeSH C16.320.400.780 – spinocerebellar degenerations
- MeSH C16.320.400.780.200 – Friedreich's ataxia
- MeSH C16.320.400.780.500 – myoclonic cerebellar dyssynergia
- MeSH C16.320.400.780.750 – olivopontocerebellar atrophies
- MeSH C16.320.400.780.875 – spinocerebellar ataxias
- MeSH C16.320.400.780.875.500 – Machado–Joseph disease
- MeSH C16.320.400.820 – Tourette syndrome
- MeSH C16.320.400.880 – tuberous sclerosis
- MeSH C16.320.400.940 – Unverricht–Lundborg syndrome

==== MeSH C16.320.565 – metabolism, inborn errors ====
- MeSH C16.320.565.066 – amino acid metabolism, inborn errors
- MeSH C16.320.565.066.102 – albinism
- MeSH C16.320.565.066.102.090 – albinism, ocular
- MeSH C16.320.565.066.102.100 – albinism, oculocutaneous
- MeSH C16.320.565.066.102.100.400 – Hermansky–Pudlak syndrome
- MeSH C16.320.565.066.102.600 – piebaldism
- MeSH C16.320.565.066.187 – alkaptonuria
- MeSH C16.320.565.066.210 – aminoaciduria, renal
- MeSH C16.320.565.066.210.250 – cystinuria
- MeSH C16.320.565.066.210.490 – Hartnup disease
- MeSH C16.320.565.066.275 – carbamoyl-phosphate synthase I deficiency disease
- MeSH C16.320.565.066.340 – citrullinemia
- MeSH C16.320.565.066.470 – homocystinuria
- MeSH C16.320.565.066.475 – hyperargininemia
- MeSH C16.320.565.066.477 – hyperglycinemia, nonketotic
- MeSH C16.320.565.066.480 – hyperhomocysteinemia
- MeSH C16.320.565.066.544 – hyperlysinemias
- MeSH C16.320.565.066.608 – maple syrup urine disease
- MeSH C16.320.565.066.620 – multiple carboxylase deficiency
- MeSH C16.320.565.066.620.100 – biotinidase deficiency
- MeSH C16.320.565.066.620.380 – holocarboxylase synthetase deficiency
- MeSH C16.320.565.066.729 – ornithine carbamoyltransferase deficiency disease
- MeSH C16.320.565.066.766 – phenylketonurias
- MeSH C16.320.565.066.766.500 – phenylketonuria, maternal
- MeSH C16.320.565.066.880 – tyrosinemias
- MeSH C16.320.565.088 – amino acid transport disorders, inborn
- MeSH C16.320.565.088.400 – Hartnup disease
- MeSH C16.320.565.088.600 – oculocerebrorenal syndrome
- MeSH C16.320.565.100 – amyloidosis, familial
- MeSH C16.320.565.100.050 – amyloid neuropathies, familial
- MeSH C16.320.565.100.160 – cerebral amyloid angiopathy, familial
- MeSH C16.320.565.150 – brain diseases, metabolic, inborn
- MeSH C16.320.565.150.050 – abetalipoproteinemia
- MeSH C16.320.565.150.162 – carbamoyl-phosphate synthase I deficiency disease
- MeSH C16.320.565.150.168 – cerebral amyloid angiopathy, familial
- MeSH C16.320.565.150.175 – citrullinemia
- MeSH C16.320.565.150.320 – galactosemias
- MeSH C16.320.565.150.355 – Hartnup disease
- MeSH C16.320.565.150.360 – hepatolenticular degeneration
- MeSH C16.320.565.150.365 – homocystinuria
- MeSH C16.320.565.150.370 – hyperargininemia
- MeSH C16.320.565.150.375 – hyperglycinemia, nonketotic
- MeSH C16.320.565.150.380 – hyperlysinemias
- MeSH C16.320.565.150.412 – Leigh disease
- MeSH C16.320.565.150.425 – Lesch–Nyhan syndrome
- MeSH C16.320.565.150.435 – lysosomal storage diseases, nervous system
- MeSH C16.320.565.150.435.295 – fucosidosis
- MeSH C16.320.565.150.435.340 – glycogen storage disease type II
- MeSH C16.320.565.150.435.590 – mucolipidoses
- MeSH C16.320.565.150.435.810 – sialic acid storage disease
- MeSH C16.320.565.150.435.825 – sphingolipidoses
- MeSH C16.320.565.150.435.825.200 – Fabry disease MeSH C16.320.565.150.435.825.300 – gangliosidoses
- MeSH C16.320.565.150.435.825.300.300 – gangliosidoses GM2
- MeSH C16.320.565.150.435.825.300.300.800 – Sandhoff disease
- MeSH C16.320.565.150.435.825.300.300.840 – Tay–Sachs disease
- MeSH C16.320.565.150.435.825.300.300.920 – Tay–Sachs disease, AB variant
- MeSH C16.320.565.150.435.825.300.400 – gangliosidosis GM1
- MeSH C16.320.565.150.435.825.400 – Gaucher disease
- MeSH C16.320.565.150.435.825.590 – leukodystrophy, globoid cell
- MeSH C16.320.565.150.435.825.594 – leukodystrophy, metachromatic
- MeSH C16.320.565.150.435.825.700 – Niemann–Pick diseases
- MeSH C16.320.565.150.520 – maple syrup urine disease
- MeSH C16.320.565.150.535 – MELAS syndrome
- MeSH C16.320.565.150.540 – Menkes kinky hair syndrome
- MeSH C16.320.565.150.545 – MERRF syndrome
- MeSH C16.320.565.150.640 – oculocerebrorenal syndrome
- MeSH C16.320.565.150.650 – ornithine carbamoyltransferase deficiency disease
- MeSH C16.320.565.150.680 – peroxisomal disorders
- MeSH C16.320.565.150.680.100 – adrenoleukodystrophy
- MeSH C16.320.565.150.680.760 – Refsum disease
- MeSH C16.320.565.150.680.970 – Zellweger syndrome
- MeSH C16.320.565.150.687 – phenylketonurias
- MeSH C16.320.565.150.687.500 – phenylketonuria, maternal
- MeSH C16.320.565.150.725 – pyruvate carboxylase deficiency disease
- MeSH C16.320.565.150.750 – pyruvate dehydrogenase complex deficiency disease
- MeSH C16.320.565.150.875 – tyrosinemias
- MeSH C16.320.565.202 – carbohydrate metabolism, inborn errors
- MeSH C16.320.565.202.125 – carbohydrate-deficient glycoprotein syndrome
- MeSH C16.320.565.202.251 – fructose metabolism, inborn errors
- MeSH C16.320.565.202.251.221 – fructose-1,6-diphosphatase deficiency
- MeSH C16.320.565.202.251.271 – Hereditary fructose intolerance
- MeSH C16.320.565.202.303 – fucosidosis
- MeSH C16.320.565.202.355 – galactosemias
- MeSH C16.320.565.202.449 – glycogen storage disease
- MeSH C16.320.565.202.449.448 – glycogen storage disease type I
- MeSH C16.320.565.202.449.500 – glycogen storage disease type II
- MeSH C16.320.565.202.449.510 – glycogen storage disease type IIb
- MeSH C16.320.565.202.449.520 – glycogen storage disease type III
- MeSH C16.320.565.202.449.540 – glycogen storage disease type IV
- MeSH C16.320.565.202.449.560 – glycogen storage disease type V
- MeSH C16.320.565.202.449.580 – glycogen storage disease type VI
- MeSH C16.320.565.202.449.600 – glycogen storage disease type VII
- MeSH C16.320.565.202.449.620 – glycogen storage disease type VIII
- MeSH C16.320.565.202.460 – hyperoxaluria, primary
- MeSH C16.320.565.202.589 – lactose intolerance
- MeSH C16.320.565.202.607 – mannosidase deficiency diseases
- MeSH C16.320.565.202.607.500 – alpha-mannosidosis
- MeSH C16.320.565.202.607.750 – beta-mannosidosis
- MeSH C16.320.565.202.670 – mucolipidoses
- MeSH C16.320.565.202.715 – mucopolysaccharidoses
- MeSH C16.320.565.202.715.640 – mucopolysaccharidosis I
- MeSH C16.320.565.202.715.645 – mucopolysaccharidosis II
- MeSH C16.320.565.202.715.650 – mucopolysaccharidosis III
- MeSH C16.320.565.202.715.655 – mucopolysaccharidosis IV
- MeSH C16.320.565.202.715.670 – mucopolysaccharidosis VI
- MeSH C16.320.565.202.715.675 – mucopolysaccharidosis VII
- MeSH C16.320.565.202.720 – multiple carboxylase deficiency
- MeSH C16.320.565.202.720.100 – biotinidase deficiency
- MeSH C16.320.565.202.720.380 – holocarboxylase synthetase deficiency
- MeSH C16.320.565.202.742 – nesidioblastosis
- MeSH C16.320.565.202.765 – persistent hyperinsulinemia hypoglycemia of infancy
- MeSH C16.320.565.202.810 – pyruvate metabolism, inborn errors
- MeSH C16.320.565.202.810.444 – Leigh disease
- MeSH C16.320.565.202.810.666 – pyruvate carboxylase deficiency disease
- MeSH C16.320.565.202.810.766 – pyruvate dehydrogenase complex deficiency disease
- MeSH C16.320.565.240 – cytochrome-c oxidase deficiency
- MeSH C16.320.565.390 – glucosephosphate dehydrogenase deficiency
- MeSH C16.320.565.437 – hyperbilirubinemia, hereditary
- MeSH C16.320.565.437.281 – Crigler–Najjar syndrome
- MeSH C16.320.565.437.528 – Gilbert disease
- MeSH C16.320.565.499 – jaundice, chronic idiopathic
- MeSH C16.320.565.556 – lipid metabolism, inborn errors
- MeSH C16.320.565.556.475 – hypercholesterolemia, familial
- MeSH C16.320.565.556.480 – hyperlipidemia, familial combined
- MeSH C16.320.565.556.480.390 – hypercholesterolemia, familial
- MeSH C16.320.565.556.480.395 – hyperlipoproteinemia type IV
- MeSH C16.320.565.556.483 – hyperlipoproteinemia type III
- MeSH C16.320.565.556.487 – hyperlipoproteinemia type IV
- MeSH C16.320.565.556.493 – hyperlipoproteinemia type V
- MeSH C16.320.565.556.500 – hypolipoproteinemia
- MeSH C16.320.565.556.500.220 – abetalipoproteinemia
- MeSH C16.320.565.556.500.440 – hypobetalipoproteinemia
- MeSH C16.320.565.556.500.448 – lecithin acyltransferase deficiency
- MeSH C16.320.565.556.500.724 – Tangier disease
- MeSH C16.320.565.556.641 – lipoidosis
- MeSH C16.320.565.556.641.201 – cholesterol ester storage disease
- MeSH C16.320.565.556.641.391 – lipoidproteinosis
- MeSH C16.320.565.556.641.509 – neuronal ceroid-lipofuscinosis
- MeSH C16.320.565.556.641.643 – refsum disease
- MeSH C16.320.565.556.641.723 – sjogren-larsson syndrome
- MeSH C16.320.565.556.641.803 – sphingolipidoses
- MeSH C16.320.565.556.641.803.300 – Fabry disease
- MeSH C16.320.565.556.641.803.350 – gangliosidoses
- MeSH C16.320.565.556.641.803.350.300 – gangliosidoses GM2
- MeSH C16.320.565.556.641.803.350.300.700 – Sandhoff disease
- MeSH C16.320.565.556.641.803.350.300.850 – Tay–Sachs disease
- MeSH C16.320.565.556.641.803.350.300.925 – Tay–Sachs disease, AB variant
- MeSH C16.320.565.556.641.803.350.360 – gangliosidosis GM1
- MeSH C16.320.565.556.641.803.441 – Gaucher disease
- MeSH C16.320.565.556.641.803.585 – leukodystrophy, globoid cell
- MeSH C16.320.565.556.641.803.594 – leukodystrophy, metachromatic
- MeSH C16.320.565.556.641.803.730 – Niemann–Pick diseases
- MeSH C16.320.565.556.641.803.850 – sea-blue histiocyte syndrome
- MeSH C16.320.565.556.641.923 – Wolman disease
- MeSH C16.320.565.556.645 – lipoprotein lipase deficiency, familial
- MeSH C16.320.565.556.750 – peroxisomal disorders
- MeSH C16.320.565.556.750.025 – acatalasia
- MeSH C16.320.565.556.750.112 – adrenoleukodystrophy
- MeSH C16.320.565.556.750.200 – chondrodysplasia punctata, rhizomelic
- MeSH C16.320.565.556.750.760 – Refsum disease
- MeSH C16.320.565.556.750.970 – Zellweger syndrome
- MeSH C16.320.565.556.850 – Smith–Lemli–Opitz syndrome
- MeSH C16.320.565.556.925 – xanthomatosis, cerebrotendinous
- MeSH C16.320.565.580 – lysosomal storage diseases
- MeSH C16.320.565.580.201 – cholesterol ester storage disease
- MeSH C16.320.565.580.554 – lysosomal storage diseases, nervous system
- MeSH C16.320.565.580.554.295 – fucosidosis
- MeSH C16.320.565.580.554.340 – glycogen storage disease type II
- MeSH C16.320.565.580.554.590 – mucolipidoses
- MeSH C16.320.565.580.554.810 – sialic acid storage disease
- MeSH C16.320.565.580.554.825 – sphingolipidoses
- MeSH C16.320.565.580.554.825.200 – Fabry disease
- MeSH C16.320.565.580.554.825.300 – gangliosidoses
- MeSH C16.320.565.580.554.825.300.300 – gangliosidoses GM2
- MeSH C16.320.565.580.554.825.300.300.800 – Sandhoff disease
- MeSH C16.320.565.580.554.825.300.300.840 – Tay–Sachs disease
- MeSH C16.320.565.580.554.825.300.300.920 – Tay–Sachs disease, AB variant
- MeSH C16.320.565.580.554.825.300.400 – gangliosidosis GM1
- MeSH C16.320.565.580.554.825.400 – Gaucher disease
- MeSH C16.320.565.580.554.825.590 – leukodystrophy, globoid cell
- MeSH C16.320.565.580.554.825.594 – leukodystrophy, metachromatic
- MeSH C16.320.565.580.554.825.700 – Niemann–Pick diseases
- MeSH C16.320.565.580.577 – mannosidase deficiency diseases
- MeSH C16.320.565.580.577.500 – alpha-mannosidosis
- MeSH C16.320.565.580.577.750 – beta-mannosidosis
- MeSH C16.320.565.580.600 – mucopolysaccharidoses
- MeSH C16.320.565.580.600.640 – mucopolysaccharidosis I
- MeSH C16.320.565.580.600.645 – mucopolysaccharidosis II
- MeSH C16.320.565.580.600.650 – mucopolysaccharidosis III
- MeSH C16.320.565.580.600.655 – mucopolysaccharidosis IV
- MeSH C16.320.565.580.600.670 – mucopolysaccharidosis VI
- MeSH C16.320.565.580.600.675 – mucopolysaccharidosis VII
- MeSH C16.320.565.580.803 – sphingolipidoses
- MeSH C16.320.565.580.803.300 – Fabry disease
- MeSH C16.320.565.580.803.350 – gangliosidoses
- MeSH C16.320.565.580.803.350.300 – gangliosidoses GM2
- MeSH C16.320.565.580.803.350.300.700 – Sandhoff disease
- MeSH C16.320.565.580.803.350.300.850 – Tay–Sachs disease
- MeSH C16.320.565.580.803.350.300.925 – Tay–Sachs disease, AB variant
- MeSH C16.320.565.580.803.441 – Gaucher disease
- MeSH C16.320.565.580.803.585 – leukodystrophy, globoid cell
- MeSH C16.320.565.580.803.594 – leukodystrophy, metachromatic
- MeSH C16.320.565.580.803.730 – niemann-pick diseases
- MeSH C16.320.565.580.803.850 – sea-blue histiocyte syndrome
- MeSH C16.320.565.580.923 – Wolman disease
- MeSH C16.320.565.618 – metal metabolism, inborn errors
- MeSH C16.320.565.618.337 – hemochromatosis
- MeSH C16.320.565.618.403 – hepatolenticular degeneration
- MeSH C16.320.565.618.482 – hypophosphatasia
- MeSH C16.320.565.618.544 – hypophosphatemia, familial
- MeSH C16.320.565.618.590 – Menkes kinky hair syndrome
- MeSH C16.320.565.618.711 – paralyses, familial periodic
- MeSH C16.320.565.618.711.550 – hypokalemic periodic paralysis
- MeSH C16.320.565.618.711.600 – paralysis, hyperkalemic periodic
- MeSH C16.320.565.618.711.600.500 – Andersen syndrome
- MeSH C16.320.565.618.815 – pseudohypoparathyroidism
- MeSH C16.320.565.618.815.815 – pseudopseudohypoparathyroidism
- MeSH C16.320.565.731 – porphyria, erythropoietic
- MeSH C16.320.565.735 – porphyrias, hepatic
- MeSH C16.320.565.735.074 – coproporphyria, hereditary
- MeSH C16.320.565.735.150 – porphyria, acute intermittent
- MeSH C16.320.565.735.250 – porphyria cutanea tarda
- MeSH C16.320.565.735.437 – porphyria, hepatoerythropoietic
- MeSH C16.320.565.735.625 – porphyria, variegate
- MeSH C16.320.565.735.812 – protoporphyria, erythropoietic
- MeSH C16.320.565.769 – progeria
- MeSH C16.320.565.798 – purine–pyrimidine metabolism, inborn errors
- MeSH C16.320.565.798.368 – gout
- MeSH C16.320.565.798.368.410 – arthritis, gouty
- MeSH C16.320.565.798.594 – Lesch–Nyhan syndrome
- MeSH C16.320.565.851 – renal tubular transport, inborn errors
- MeSH C16.320.565.851.093 – acidosis, renal tubular
- MeSH C16.320.565.851.191 – aminoaciduria, renal
- MeSH C16.320.565.851.191.250 – cystinuria
- MeSH C16.320.565.851.191.457 – Hartnup disease
- MeSH C16.320.565.851.368 – cystinosis
- MeSH C16.320.565.851.368.210 – Fanconi syndrome
- MeSH C16.320.565.851.532 – glycosuria, renal
- MeSH C16.320.565.851.647 – hypophosphatemia, familial
- MeSH C16.320.565.851.750 – oculocerebrorenal syndrome
- MeSH C16.320.565.851.770 – pseudohypoaldosteronism
- MeSH C16.320.565.925 – steroid metabolism, inborn errors
- MeSH C16.320.565.925.249 – adrenal hyperplasia, congenital
- MeSH C16.320.565.925.500 – mineralocorticoid excess syndrome, apparent
- MeSH C16.320.565.925.750 – ichthyosis, x-linked
- MeSH C16.320.565.925.875 – Smith–Lemli–Opitz syndrome

==== MeSH C16.320.577 – muscular dystrophies ====
- MeSH C16.320.577.074 – distal myopathies
- MeSH C16.320.577.149 – glycogen storage disease type VII
- MeSH C16.320.577.280 – muscular dystrophies, limb-girdle
- MeSH C16.320.577.300 – muscular dystrophy, Duchenne
- MeSH C16.320.577.350 – muscular dystrophy, Emery–Dreifuss
- MeSH C16.320.577.400 – muscular dystrophy, facioscapulohumeral
- MeSH C16.320.577.450 – muscular dystrophy, oculopharyngeal
- MeSH C16.320.577.500 – myotonic dystrophy

==== MeSH C16.320.700 – neoplastic syndromes, hereditary ====
- MeSH C16.320.700.100 – adenomatous polyposis coli
- MeSH C16.320.700.100.393 – Gardner's syndrome
- MeSH C16.320.700.175 – basal-cell nevus syndrome
- MeSH C16.320.700.250 – colorectal neoplasms, hereditary nonpolyposis
- MeSH C16.320.700.305 – dysplastic nevus syndrome
- MeSH C16.320.700.330 – exostoses, multiple hereditary
- MeSH C16.320.700.435 – hamartoma syndrome, multiple
- MeSH C16.320.700.600 – Li–Fraumeni syndrome
- MeSH C16.320.700.630 – multiple endocrine neoplasia
- MeSH C16.320.700.630.500 – multiple endocrine neoplasia type 1
- MeSH C16.320.700.630.505 – multiple endocrine neoplasia type 2a
- MeSH C16.320.700.630.510 – multiple endocrine neoplasia type 2b
- MeSH C16.320.700.642 – Wilms' tumor
- MeSH C16.320.700.642.220 – Denys–Drash syndrome
- MeSH C16.320.700.642.950 – WAGR syndrome
- MeSH C16.320.700.645 – Neurofibromatosis
- MeSH C16.320.700.645.650 – neurofibromatosis 1
- MeSH C16.320.700.645.655 – neurofibromatosis 2
- MeSH C16.320.700.705 – Peutz–Jeghers syndrome
- MeSH C16.320.700.852 – Sturge–Weber syndrome

==== MeSH C16.320.850 – skin diseases, genetic ====
- MeSH C16.320.850.080 – albinism
- MeSH C16.320.850.080.090 – albinism, ocular
- MeSH C16.320.850.080.100 – albinism, oculocutaneous
- MeSH C16.320.850.080.100.400 – Hermansky–Pudlak syndrome
- MeSH C16.320.850.080.600 – piebaldism
- MeSH C16.320.850.180 – cutis laxa
- MeSH C16.320.850.210 – dermatitis, atopic
- MeSH C16.320.850.235 – dyskeratosis congenita
- MeSH C16.320.850.250 – ectodermal dysplasia
- MeSH C16.320.850.250.398 – Ellis–van Creveld syndrome
- MeSH C16.320.850.250.424 – focal dermal hypoplasia
- MeSH C16.320.850.250.712 – neurocutaneous syndromes
- MeSH C16.320.850.260 – Ehlers–Danlos syndrome
- MeSH C16.320.850.275 – epidermolysis bullosa
- MeSH C16.320.850.275.160 – epidermolysis bullosa dystrophica
- MeSH C16.320.850.275.170 – epidermolysis bullosa, junctional
- MeSH C16.320.850.275.180 – epidermolysis bullosa simplex
- MeSH C16.320.850.400 – ichthyosiform erythroderma, congenital
- MeSH C16.320.850.400.375 – hyperkeratosis, epidermolytic
- MeSH C16.320.850.400.410 – ichthyosis, lamellar
- MeSH C16.320.850.405 – ichthyosis vulgaris
- MeSH C16.320.850.408 – ichthyosis, x-linked
- MeSH C16.320.850.420 – incontinentia pigmenti
- MeSH C16.320.850.475 – keratoderma, palmoplantar
- MeSH C16.320.850.475.440 – keratoderma, palmoplantar, diffuse
- MeSH C16.320.850.475.600 – Papillon–Lefèvre disease
- MeSH C16.320.850.490 – keratosis follicularis
- MeSH C16.320.850.700 – pemphigus, benign familial
- MeSH C16.320.850.730 – porokeratosis
- MeSH C16.320.850.738 – porphyria, erythropoietic
- MeSH C16.320.850.742 – porphyrias, hepatic
- MeSH C16.320.850.742.074 – coproporphyria, hereditary
- MeSH C16.320.850.742.150 – porphyria, acute intermittent
- MeSH C16.320.850.742.250 – porphyria cutanea tarda
- MeSH C16.320.850.742.437 – porphyria, hepatoerythropoietic
- MeSH C16.320.850.742.625 – porphyria, variegate
- MeSH C16.320.850.742.812 – protoporphyria, erythropoietic
- MeSH C16.320.850.750 – pseudoxanthoma elasticum
- MeSH C16.320.850.765 – Rothmund–Thomson syndrome
- MeSH C16.320.850.820 – Sjögren–Larsson syndrome
- MeSH C16.320.850.970 – xeroderma pigmentosum

=== MeSH C16.614 – infant, newborn, diseases ===
==== MeSH C16.614.053 – anemia, neonatal ====
- MeSH C16.614.053.344 – fetofetal transfusion
- MeSH C16.614.053.511 – fetomaternal transfusion

==== MeSH C16.614.131 – birth injuries ====
- MeSH C16.614.131.587 – paralysis, obstetric

==== MeSH C16.614.304 – erythroblastosis, fetal ====
- MeSH C16.614.304.502 – kernicterus

==== MeSH C16.614.414 – hydrocephalus ====
- MeSH C16.614.414.200 – Dandy–Walker syndrome

==== MeSH C16.614.451 – hyperbilirubinemia, neonatal ====
- MeSH C16.614.451.500 – jaundice, neonatal
- MeSH C16.614.451.500.250 – jaundice, chronic idiopathic

==== MeSH C16.614.492 – ichthyosis ====
- MeSH C16.614.492.400 – ichthyosiform erythroderma, congenital
- MeSH C16.614.492.400.375 – hyperkeratosis, epidermolytic
- MeSH C16.614.492.400.410 – ichthyosis, lamellar
- MeSH C16.614.492.420 – ichthyosis, x-linked
- MeSH C16.614.492.723 – Sjögren–Larsson syndrome

==== MeSH C16.614.521 – infant, premature, diseases ====
- MeSH C16.614.521.125 – bronchopulmonary dysplasia
- MeSH C16.614.521.450 – leukomalacia, periventricular
- MeSH C16.614.521.563 – respiratory distress syndrome, newborn
- MeSH C16.614.521.563.475 – hyaline membrane disease
- MeSH C16.614.521.731 – retinopathy of prematurity

==== MeSH C16.614.947 – Wolman disease ====
The list continues at List of MeSH codes (C17).
