= Red man syndrome =

Red man syndrome may refer to:

- Red man syndrome (Drug eruption)
- Erythroderma
