= Epidermolytic acanthoma =

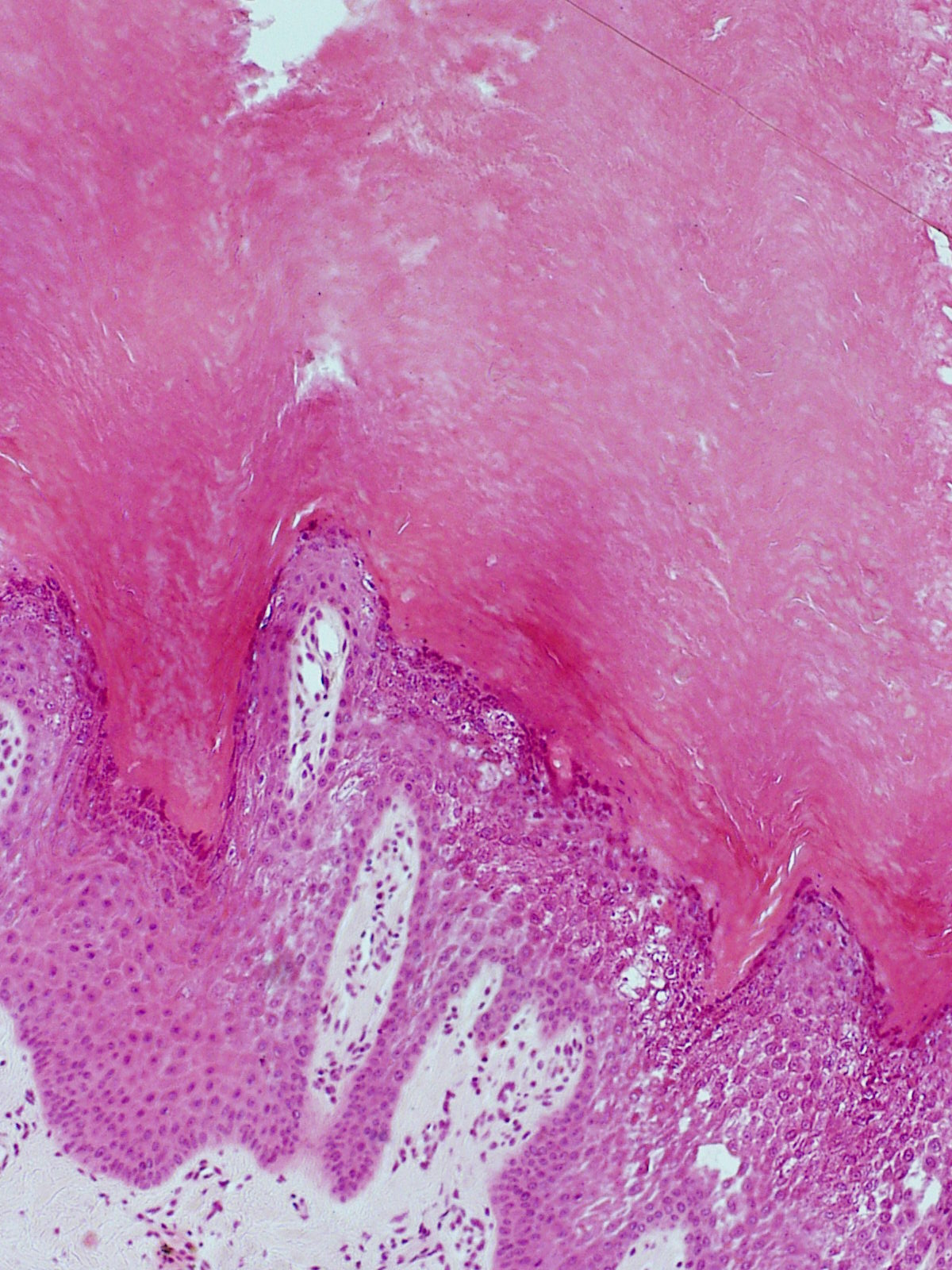
- Epidermolytic acanthoma
- Specialty: Dermatology

Epidermolytic acanthomas are a cutaneous condition characterized by discrete keratotic papules in adults.

Epidermolytic acanthomas may exist in groups or as solitary lesions. They range in size from 1-2 mm. They usually affect the trunk, extremities, scrotum, or vulva. They are sometimes itchy.

The cause of epidermolytic acanthoma is unknown.

Epidermolytic acanthoma is diagnosed based on clinical and histological signs. Epidermolytic hyperkeratosis is the main characteristic of epidermolytic acanthoma.

Treatment isn't needed.

== Signs and symptoms ==
Epidermolytic acanthoma manifests clinically as tiny, fleshy or white papules that range in size from 1 to 2 mm. They may exist alone or in groups. They often affect the trunk, extremities, or scrotum and vulva. Although they can be itchy, they are frequently asymptomatic, and the chronic type can result in lichenification.

== Causes ==
The exact cause of the lesion is unknown. There have been suggestions that epidermolytic acanthoma could represent a localized form of generalized hereditary epidermolytic hyperkeratosis. While some have searched for a connection between HPV and epidermolytic acanthoma, they have not consistently found one. Epidermolytic acanthoma typically affects people who have never had an STD and who have never engaged in unsafe sexual conduct. There has also been weak evidence to support the suggestions of trauma or continuous scratching. Some expressed the belief that immunosuppression.

== Diagnosis ==
The distinctive histologic findings in the appropriate clinical situation are necessary for an accurate diagnosis of epidermolytic acanthoma.

Epidermolytic hyperkeratosis on over 50% of the epidermolytic acanthoma surface is the main histologic characteristic of the condition. Keratinocytes with coarse keratohyalin granules, reticular degeneration, perinuclear vacuolation, and perinuclear eosinophilic inclusions in the granular and spinous layers are characteristics of epidermolytic hyperkeratosis.

== Treatment ==
There is no need for treatment, but if the patient feels embarrassed, there are a number of different therapies that can be performed, with varying degrees of success, such as cryotherapy, topical immune system modulators, or surgical excision.

== See also ==
- Dermatosis papulosa nigra
- List of cutaneous conditions
