= BCIE =

BCIE may refer to:

- Banco Centroamericano de Integración Economica, a Central American banking establishment
- Bullous congenital ichthyosiform erythroderma, a rare genetic disorder of the skin
- The Bell Centre for Information Engineering, a research group at the University of Western Ontario in the area of wireless communications and networking
