= Triangular alopecia =

Type of hair loss

- Other names: Temporal alopecia, temporal triangular alopecia
- TTA is inherited in an autosomal dominant pattern.
- Specialty: Dermatology

Triangular alopecia, or temporal triangular alopecia (TTA), is hair loss that may be congenital but usually appears in childhood as a focal patch of loss that may be complete or leaving fine vellus hairs behind. Affected individuals are typically entirely healthy. Hair restoration surgery using follicular unit transplantation has been a successful treatment modality for TTA

== Presentation ==
=== Association with other conditions ===
TTA has been associated with several disorders, such as phakomatosis pigmentovascularis. And a rare syndrome Setleis syndrome. It is inherited by the autosomal dominant trait and is characterized by cutis aplasia or atrophic skin at the temples, which is said to resemble forceps marks. There may also be a coarse facial appearance, anomalies of the eyelashes and eyebrows, and periorbital puffiness.

== Frequency ==
The suggested frequency for this condition in the general population is around 0.11%. The hair loss is non-progressive and does not expand beyond these areas. It is a non-inflammatory, non-scarring form of hair loss easily confused with alopecia areata. In one report, the condition was incorrectly believed by the parents to be induced by doctors inserting intravenous cannulas into scalp vessels during the neonatal period. The condition is permanent and the affected skin does not change later in life.

Of the 53 reported cases of TTA, more than half (55.8%) were detected in childhood between the ages of 2 and 9 years, while 36.5% were detected at birth and only 3.8% (only two cases) in adulthood.

== See also ==
- Skin lesion
- List of cutaneous conditions
