= Erythropoietic porphyria =

- Specialty: Dermatology

Erythropoietic porphyria is a type of porphyria associated with erythropoietic cells. In erythropoietic porphyrias, the enzyme deficiency occurs in the red blood cells.

== Types ==
There are three types:

Name	OMIM	Gene
erythropoietic protoporphyria (EPP)	177000	ferrochelatase
congenital erythropoietic porphyria or "Gunther's" (CEP)	263700	uroporphyrinogen III synthase
hepatoerythropoietic porphyria	176100	uroporphyrinogen III decarboxylase

== Presentation ==
X-linked dominant erythropoietic protoporphyria is a relatively mild version of porphyria with the predominant symptom being extreme photosensitivity causing severe itching and burning sensation of the skin due to the buildup of protoporphyrin IX. One possible treatment was discovered when treating an individual with supplemental iron for a gastric ulcer. Levels of free protoporphyrin decreased significantly as there was iron available for the FECH to produce heme. Levels of zinc-protoporphyrin, however did not decrease.

== Cause ==
X-linked sideroblastic anemia or "X-linked dominant erythropoietic protoporphyria", associated with ALAS2 (aminolevulinic acid synthase), has also been described. X-linked dominant erythropoietic protoporphyria (XDEPP) is caused by a gain of function mutation in the ALAS2 (5-aminolevulinate synthase) gene; that gene encodes the very first enzyme in the heme biosynthetic pathway. The mutation is caused by a frameshift mutation caused by one of two deletions in the ALAS2 exon 11, either c. 1706-1709 delAGTG or c. 1699-1700 delAT. This alters the 19th and 20th residues of the C-terminal domain thereby altering the secondary structure of the enzyme. The delAT mutation only occurred in one family studied whereas the delAGTG mutation occurred in several genetically distinct families. The delAGTG causes a loss of an α-helix which is replaced by a β-sheet.

Previously known mutations in the ALAS2 resulted in a loss-of-function mutation causing X-linked sideroblastic anemia. Erythropoietic protoporphyria (EPP) has similar symptoms as X-linked dominant erythropoietic protoporphyria but the mutation occurs as a loss-of-function in the FECH (ferrochelatase) enzyme; the very last enzyme in the pathway. All individuals studied presented symptoms without mutations in the FECH enzyme. The patterns of inheritance led the researchers to conclude the mutation must come from an enzyme on the X-chromosome with ALAS2 being the most likely candidate.

X-linked dominant erythropoietic protoporphyria is distinct from EPP in that there is no overload of Fe^{2+} ions. Additionally, unlike the other condition the arises out of a mutation of the ALAS2 gene, there is no anaemia. XDEPP is characterized by a buildup of protoporphyrin IX caused by in increased level of function in the ALAS2 enzyme. Because there is a buildup of protoporphyrin IX with no malfunction of the FECH enzyme, all the available Fe^{2+} is used in the production of heme, causing the FECH enzyme to use Zn^{2+} in its place, causing a buildup of zinc-protoporphyrin IX.

== Diagnosis ==
The diagnosis is confirmed by finding increased red blood cell and plasma protoporphyrin levels. The peak plasma fluorescence occurs at 634 nm, following excitation at 410 nm.

== See also ==
- Hepatic porphyria
