= Setleis syndrome =

- Other names: FFDD3
- Setleis syndrome is said to be inherited in an autosomal recessive manner.
- Specialty: Dermatology

Setleis syndrome is a very rare genetic disorder characterized by facial skin abnormalities and double upper eyelashes and missing lower eyelashes. It belongs to a group of diseases known as ectodermal dysplasias. Ectodermal dysplasias typically affect the hair, teeth, nails, or skin. Setleis syndrome is characterized by distinctive abnormalities of the facial area that may be apparent at birth (congenital). Most affected infants have multiple, scar-like, circular depressions on both temples (bitemporal). These marks closely resemble those made when forceps are used to assist delivery. The range and severity of symptoms may vary from case to case.

Most cases of Setleis syndrome are thought to be inherited as an autosomal recessive genetic trait due to mutations in the TWIST2 gene.

The differential diagnosis of Setleis syndrome includes X-linked focal dermal hypoplasia, or Goltz syndrome; a syndrome of focal dermal hypoplasia, morning glory anomaly, and polymicrogyria; incontinentia pigmenti; oculocerebrocutaneous syndrome; Rothmund–Thomson syndrome; and MLS (microphthalmia with linear skin defects) syndrome caused by deletions or point mutations in the HCCS gene.

== See also ==
- Triangular alopecia
- Red lunulae
- List of skin conditions
