= Ichthyosis vulgaris =

Skin disorder

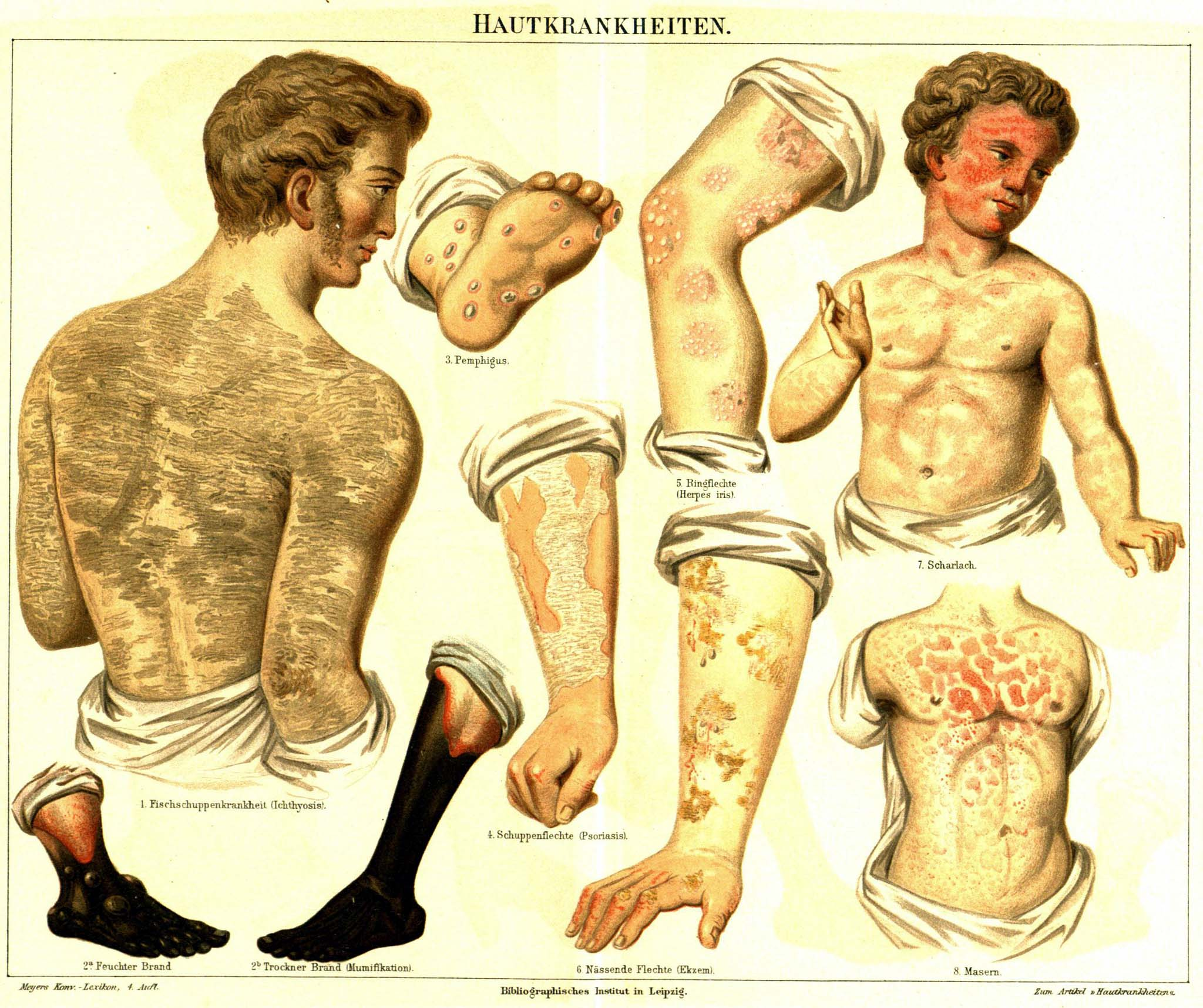
- Ichthyosis vulgaris #1 (top-left)
- Specialty: Dermatology

Ichthyosis vulgaris (also known as "autosomal dominant ichthyosis" and "Ichthyosis simplex") is a skin disorder causing dry, scaly skin. It is the most common form, and one of the mildest forms, of ichthyosis, affecting around 1 in 250 people. For this reason it is known as common ichthyosis. It is usually an autosomal dominant inherited disease (often associated with filaggrin), although a rare non-heritable version called acquired ichthyosis exists.

== Presentation ==
Ichthyosis vulgaris is the most common type within the ichthyoses, a diverse group of inherited skin disorders characterized by the way the skin produces keratin. These conditions all share the common trait of causing generalized skin scaling, which can range in its intensity. In comparison to the other forms of ichthyosis, IV is generally viewed as the least severe. The symptoms of the inherited form of ichthyosis vulgaris are not usually present at birth but generally develop between three months and five years of age. The symptoms will often improve with age, although they may grow more severe again in old age. But when ichthyosis vulgaris is typically in infancy, signs like skin dryness (xerosis), skin lesions, keratosis pilaris (small skin bumps), thickened skin on the palms and soles (palmoplantar hyperlinearity), scaly skin (scaly dermatosis), and, in severe cases, red and inflamed skin (erythroderma) become apparent, usually by age 5. While most individuals with this condition can expect a regular lifespan, potential complications include vitamin D deficiency and hearing problems due to ear scaling. Furthermore, the visible changes in the skin can significantly diminish a person's quality of life. As the primary therapeutic approach, physicians often recommend using creams containing 10% urea, along with ceramides and other moisturising compounds, to manage ichthyosis vulgaris.

The condition is not life-threatening; the impact on the patient, if it is a mild case, is generally restricted to mild itching and the social impact of having skin with an unusual appearance. People with mild cases have symptoms that include scaly patches on the shins, fine white scales on the forearms and upper arms, and rough palms. People with the mildest cases have no symptoms other than faint, tell-tale "mosaic lines" between the Achilles tendons and the calf muscles.

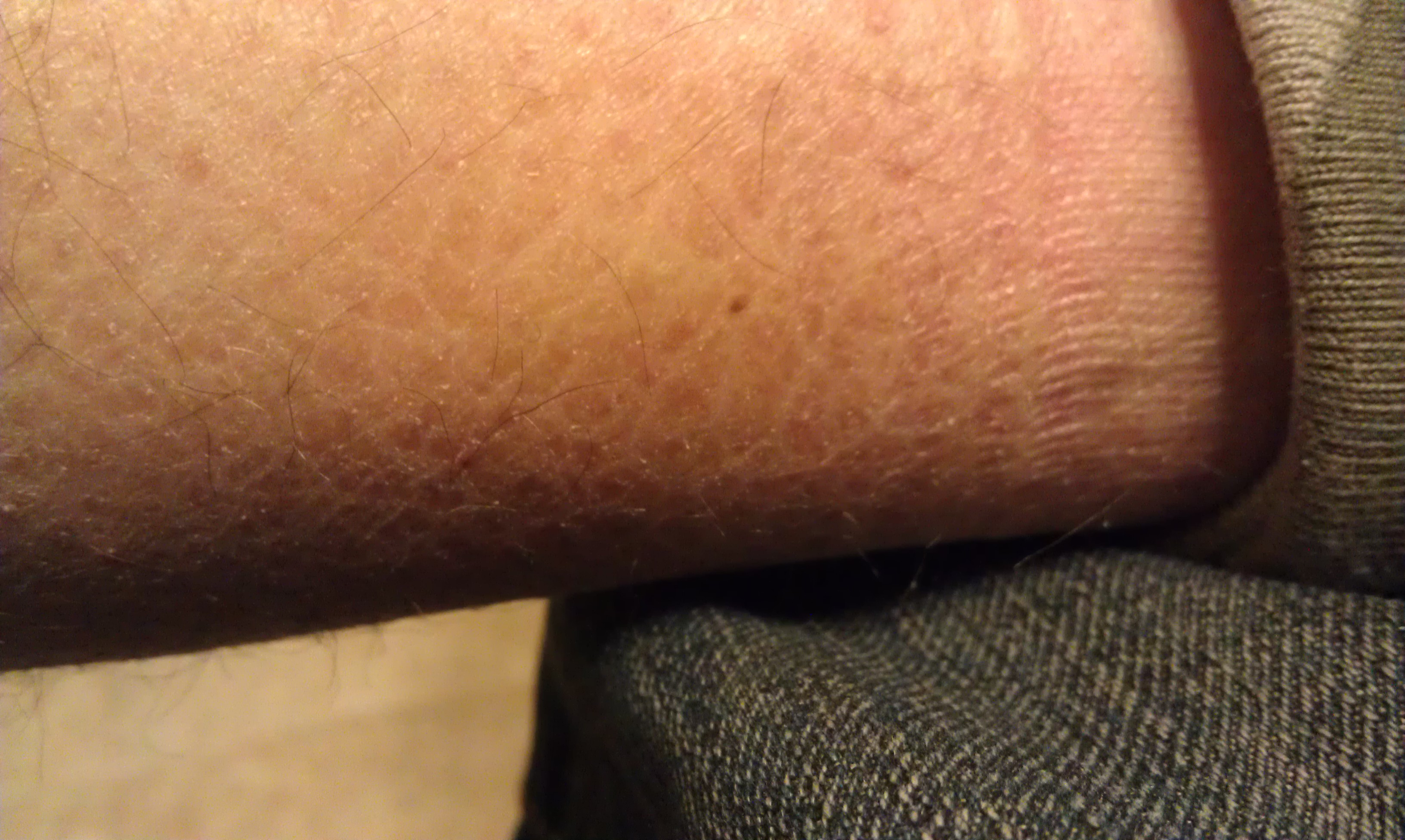
Mild presentation of ichthyosis vulgaris: faint, mosaic lines are visible on the calf

Severe cases, although rare, do exist. Severe cases entail the buildup of scales everywhere, with areas of the body that have a concentration of sweat glands being the least affected. Areas where the skin rubs against together, such as the armpits, the groin, and the "folded" areas of the elbow and knees, are less affected. Various topical treatments are available to "exfoliate" the scales. These include lotions that contain alpha-hydroxy acids.

=== Associated conditions ===
Many people with severe ichthyosis have problems sweating due to the buildup of scales on the skin. This may lead to problems such as "prickly itch", which results from the afflicted skin being unable to sweat due to the buildup of scales, or problems associated with overheating. The majority of people with vulgaris can sweat at least a little. Paradoxically this means most would be more comfortable living in a hot and humid climate. Sweating helps to shed scales, which improves the appearance of the skin and prevents "prickly itch".

The dry skin will crack on the digits or extremities and create bloody cuts. Skin is painful when inflamed, tight, or both. For children and adolescents, psychological concerns may include inconsistent self-image, mood fluctuations due to cyclical outbreaks, a tendency to addiction, the possibility of social withdrawal when skin is noticeably infected, and preoccupation with appearance.

Strong air conditioning and excessive consumption of alcohol can also increase the buildup of scales.

Over 50% of people with ichthyosis vulgaris have some type of atopic disease such as allergies, eczema, or asthma. Another common condition associated with ichthyosis vulgaris is keratosis pilaris (small bumps mainly appearing on the back of the upper arms).

== Genetics ==
Ichthyosis vulgaris is a common genetic disorder caused by a single gene. This disorder is thought to happen because of changes in the gene responsible for making a protein called profilaggrin, which later turns into filaggrin. Filaggrin plays a crucial role in how our skin is built. About 10% of people have some gene changes in the profilaggrin gene, and this can also be linked to another skin problem called atopic dermatitis, which often occurs along with ichthyosis vulgaris. We know the exact gene changes responsible for ichthyosis vulgaris in some cases, but not all of them.

Usually, ichthyosis vulgaris is considered a dominant condition, which means that just one gene change can lead to the disease, and someone with this change has a 50% chance of passing it on to their child. But there is some research suggesting it might be a bit more complex, where one gene change causes a mild form of the disease, and changes in both copies of the gene would cause a more severe case.

== Diagnosis ==
Ichthyosis vulgaris is mainly diagnosed based on the clinical features of the patient mainly the physical exam findings and the personal and family histories. History of the age of the onset, and using family pedigree to clarify the pattern of inheritance can help to specify ichthyosis vulgaris among other types of ichthyoses. In some cases, it might be hard to clearly differentiate between ichthyosis vulgaris and other ichthyoses; a doctor can go request genetic testing or take a biopsy and make a histopathology examination, but even this test is still suggestive and not specific for ichthyosis vulgaris.

== Treatment ==
Hereditary ichthyosis vulgaris is a persistent condition that tends to improve with age but typically demands ongoing management. The seriousness of acquired ichthyosis, on the other hand, is generally linked to the underlying systemic condition. The primary approach for both forms involves maintaining skin hydration and applying ointments to prevent moisture loss. Hydration encourages skin shedding by enhancing the activity of certain enzymes and making the skin more responsive to mechanical forces. It also enhances the suppleness of the outermost skin layer.

For some patients, topical retinoids can be beneficial, while alpha-hydroxy acids such as lactic, glycolic, or pyruvic acids prove effective in moisturising the skin. They operate by breaking down skin cells in the lower layers of the newly formed outer skin layer. For example, lactic acid is available in a 12% ammonium lactate lotion or can be specially compounded at concentrations of 5–10% in a suitable base. Twice-daily applications have proven more effective than petroleum-based creams in managing ichthyosis vulgaris.

To help remove scales, keratolytics like salicylic acid can be useful as they induce the breakdown of skin cells in the upper skin layer. There is a commercially available 6% salicylic acid gel suitable for use on limited areas.

Many over-the-counter products contain either urea or propylene glycol. Moisturisers with lower-strength urea (10–20%) enhance the flexibility of the outer skin layer by acting as humectants. Propylene glycol, on the other hand, draws water through the outer skin layer, facilitating the shedding of thickened skin post-hydration. It is a common component in both prescription and over-the-counter products. A new emulsion containing urea (10%), ceramides, and natural moisturising factors, applied twice daily, can be beneficial for individuals with hyperkeratotic and dry skin.

Topical retinoids, like tretinoin, might also provide benefits, as they reduce the cohesion of skin cells, promote cell turnover, and inhibit the production of keratin. In some small trials, tazarotene, a selective topical retinoid, has demonstrated effectiveness. While steroids are generally ineffective for ichthyosis vulgaris, a mild topical steroid could be employed to relieve itching. In cases of acquired ichthyosis vulgaris, treatment primarily involves addressing the underlying systemic condition, often leading to symptom improvement. Ongoing research aims to assess and compare the physical and chemical properties of various topical emollients to determine their efficacy in managing ichthyosis vulgaris.

== See also ==
- Harlequin-type ichthyosis
- List of cutaneous conditions
- List of cutaneous conditions caused by mutations in keratins
