= Hepatic porphyria =

- Specialty: Endocrinology

Hepatic porphyrias are a form of porphyria in which toxic porphyrin molecules build up in the liver. Hepatic porphyrias can result from a number of different enzyme deficiencies.

Examples include (in order of synthesis pathway):

- Acute intermittent porphyria
- Porphyria cutanea tarda and Hepatoerythropoietic porphyria
- Hereditary coproporphyria
- Variegate porphyria

== See also ==
- Erythropoietic porphyria
- Givosiran
