= Acrodermatitis =

- Specialty: Dermatology

Acrodermatitis /ac·ro·der·ma·ti·tis/ is a childhood form of dermatitis selectively affecting the hands and feet and may be accompanied by mild symptoms of fever and malaise. It may also be associated with hepatitis B and other viral infections. The lesions appear as small coppery-red, flat-topped firm papules that appear in crops and sometimes in long linear strings, often symmetric. It is a diffuse chronic skin disease usually confined to the limbs, seen mainly in women in Northern, Central, and Eastern Europe, and characterized initially by an erythematous, oedematous, pruritic phase followed by sclerosis and atrophy. It is caused by infection with Borrelia burgdorferi.
