= Focal dermal hypoplasia =

- Other names: Goltz syndrome
- This condition is inherited in an X-linked dominant manner.
- Specialty: Medical genetics
- Frequency: 0.0001%

Focal dermal hypoplasia is a form of ectodermal dysplasia. It is a multisystem disorder characterized primarily by skin manifestations to the atrophic and hypoplastic areas of skin which are present at birth. These defects manifest as yellow-pink bumps on the skin and pigmentation changes. The disorder is also associated with shortness of stature and some evidence suggests that it can cause epilepsy.

== Genetics ==
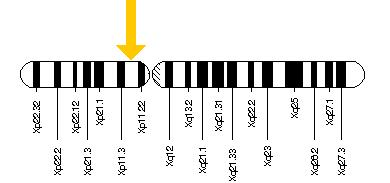
The molecular Location of the PORCN gene on the X chromosome: base pairs 48,367,346 to 48,379,201

Focal dermal hypoplasia has been associated with PORCN gene mutations on the X chromosome. 90% of the individuals who are affected with the syndrome are female: the commonly accepted, though unconfirmed, explanation for this is that the non-mosaic hemizygous males are not viable.

The differential diagnosis of focal dermal hypoplasia (Goltz) syndrome includes autosomal recessive Setleis syndrome due to TWIST2 gene mutations. It associated with morning glory anomaly, polymicrogyria, incontinentia pigmenti, oculocerebrocutaneous syndrome, Rothmund-Thomson syndrome and microphthalmia with linear skin defects (also known as MLS) syndrome because they are all caused by deletions or point mutations in the HCCS gene.

== Diagnosis ==
Goltz syndrome is a very rare diagnosis. To date, there are fewer than 25 cases of Goltz syndrome in the United States.

== Treatment ==
Management is targeted toward the various soft tissue and skeletal anomalies, with the goal of achieving optimal functional and cosmetic results.

== Eponyms ==
=== Jessner–Cole syndrome ===
The disorder was first formally recognized by dermatologists Max Jessner and Harold Newton Cole in the early 20th century. Jessner and Cole's papers were referenced more than any others in the first half of the 20th century.

=== Goltz–Gorlin ===
Besides its formal name, it is most commonly referred to as Goltz–Gorlin syndrome, after Robert Goltz and Robert Gorlin. Goltz and Gorlin worked together at the University of Minnesota and are credited for describing the symptoms of the disorder in more detail than ever before and tracking its genetic trends. The name became popular during the second half of the 20th century.

== See also ==
- List of cutaneous conditions
- List of radiographic findings associated with cutaneous conditions
