= Papillon–Lefèvre syndrome =

Papillon-Lefevre syndrome
- Other names: Palmoplantar keratoderma with periodontitis
- Papillon–Lefèvre syndrome has an autosomal recessive pattern of inheritance.
- Specialty: Dermatology, medical genetics
- Frequency: 0.0005%

Papillon–Lefèvre syndrome (PLS), also known as palmoplantar keratoderma with periodontitis, is an autosomal recessive genetic disorder caused by a deficiency in cathepsin C. speciality is dermatology medical genetics and dentistry

== Presentation ==
PLS is characterized by periodontitis and palmoplantar keratoderma. The severe destruction of periodontium results in loss of most primary teeth by the age of 4 and most permanent teeth by age 14. Hyperkeratosis of palms and soles of feet appear in first few years of life. Destructions of periodontium follows almost immediately after the eruption of last molar tooth. The teeth are involved in roughly the same order in which they erupt.

== Cause ==
Mutations in the cathepsin C gene (CTSC), located at human chromosome 11q14.1-q14.3, are the cause of PLS. The disorder is inherited in an autosomal recessive manner. This means the defective gene responsible for the disorder is located on an autosome (chromosome 11 is an autosome), and two copies of the defective gene (one inherited from each parent) are required in order to be born with the disorder. The parents of an individual with an autosomal recessive disorder both carry one copy of the defective gene, but usually do not experience any signs or symptoms of the disorder.

== Diagnosis ==
Early diagnosis and treatment is important to allow for prompt treatment to prevent long-term consequences such as tooth loss.

A diagnosis can be made by a urine analysis for low/no activity of the enzyme cathepsin C.

A full patient history and identification of characteristic physical symptoms is another way to identify this syndrome. However, often the symptoms are visually similar to other, milder, conditions, and it is only with the eruption of infant teeth that tissue degeneration or inflammation become apparent, often in conjunction with a sudden abnormality of skin colour. Another physical diagnosis is to identify abnormal accumulation of calcium within the skull.

Genetic testing at the molecular level can look for alterations in the CTSC gene which are known to cause Papillon–Lefèvre syndrome, however this diagnostic service is only available at specialized laboratories.

== Treatment ==
In 2006, retinoids and antibiotics have been used with a successful dental maintenance for one year. In the past, only extraction of all teeth and construction of a complete denture were made.

An alternative to rehabilitation with conventional dental prothesis after total loss of the natural teeth was proposed by Drs. Ahmad Alzahaili and his teacher Jean-François Tulasne (developer of the partial bone graft technique used). This approach entails transplanting bone extracted from the cortical external surface of the parietal bone to the patient's mouth, affording the patient the opportunity to lead a normal life. Notwithstanding this treatment does not scope the disease itself. Actually, it is the repositioning of bone from calvaria to the maxillary bones, and placement of dental implants in a completely edentulous maxilla when the patient has already lost all teeth. An already developed method to reconstruct maxillae in edentulous elderly people by other dental professionals. There's still no real treatment to help those with this disease to keep all their natural teeth, though their exfoliation and loss can be delayed. The maintenance of teeth is done by dental professionals with a procedure called scaling and root planing with the use of systemic antibiotics. The syndrome should be diagnosed as earlier as possible, so the teeth can be kept longer in the mouth, helping the development of the maxillary bones.

== Eponym ==
It is named for M. M. Papillon and Paul Lefèvre.

== See also ==
- Porokeratosis plantaris discreta
- List of cutaneous conditions
- List of dental abnormalities associated with cutaneous conditions
