= Sclerema neonatorum =

- Specialty: Pediatrics

Sclerema neonatorum is a rare and severe skin condition that is characterized by diffuse hardening of the subcutaneous tissue with minimal inflammation.

Sclerema neonatorum is categorized as a kind of panniculitis that appears as subcutaneous adipose tissue and skin hardening. The hardened skin and subcutaneous fat stick to the underlying bone and muscle so much that it makes it difficult to breathe and eat, and it usually results in death.

Severe respiratory or gastrointestinal disorders, congenital malformations, dehydration, and sepsis are among the comorbid conditions that affect infants. Sclerema neonatorum usually has a very bad prognosis and a high death rate.

== Signs and symptoms ==
Sclerema neonatorum causes tight, adherent, and waxy-looking skin that is affected by underlying tissues. Some babies may have mottled or purple skin. It is not possible to elevate, pinch, or depress the skin. Traditionally, Sclerema neonatorum appears symmetrically on the trunk, thighs, or buttocks. However, the skin hardening rapidly spreads to the entire body's subcutaneous fat, excluding the parts of the body that are fat-free, such as the palms, soles, and genitalia. A fixed face, resembling a mask, could be the result of the facial skin becoming harder.

== Causes ==
sclerema neonatorum's pathogenesis is still unknown. When comparing the subcutaneous fat composition of older people with that of neonates, it is evident that the former has a higher concentration of saturated fats. Neonatal fat has a unique biochemical characteristic that increases its propensity to solidify in a cold environment. It has been proposed that subcutaneous adipose hardening in sclerema neonatorum is initiated by lowered body temperatures experienced during clinical shock. This theory is refuted by the fact that fat hardening shouldn't happen until skin temperature falls below freezing. Other theories suggest that sclerema neonatorum develops as a result of dysregulated fat metabolism, stems from adipocyte-peripheral connective tissue dysfunction, or is a secondary effect of systemic toxicity.

== Diagnosis ==
sclerema neonatorum is typically diagnosed clinically when a critically sick newborn exhibits diffuse skin hardening. The afflicted skin cannot be pitted, folded, or pinched because it is attached to the underlying tissue. For histopathologic confirmation, a skin biopsy could be helpful if the diagnosis is uncertain.

Necrosis of subcutaneous fat without a significant inflammatory infiltrate and without obvious granulomatous changes, the formation of needle-shaped clefts in adipocytes, sometimes in a radial arrangement, and fibrous thickening of the tissue surrounding fat lobules are histopathologic findings that support a diagnosis of sclerema neonatorum.

== Outlook ==
sclerema neonatorum is linked to a high death rate because it worsens breathing and other essential functions in critically ill newborns. Based on case series, the survival rate of affected neonates is estimated to be between 13 and 39 percent. There are usually no long-term skin problems among survivors.

== Epidemiology ==
Usually affecting newborns, Sclerema neonatorum manifests itself during the first week of life, though some cases have been documented to occur outside of this time frame. Based on the compilation of case reports, it appears that men may experience the condition slightly more frequently than women (male to female ratio: 1.6:1).

== See also ==
- Panniculitis
- Skin lesion
- List of cutaneous conditions
