= Hepatoerythropoietic porphyria =

- Other names: HEP
- UroD drawn from PDB: 1URO.
- Specialty: Dermatology, gastroenterology, medical genetics, endocrinology

Hepatoerythropoietic porphyria is a very rare form of hepatic porphyria caused by a disorder in both genes which code Uroporphyrinogen III decarboxylase (UROD).

It has a similar presentation to porphyria cutanea tarda (PCT), but with earlier onset. In classifications which define PCT type 1 as "sporadic" and PCT type 2 as "familial", hepatoerythropoietic porphyria is more similar to type 2.

== See also ==
- Hereditary coproporphyria
- List of cutaneous conditions
- List of dental abnormalities associated with cutaneous conditions
