= Epidermolytic hyperkeratosis =

Epidermolytic Ichthyosis (EI)
- Other names: Bullous epidermis ichthyosis
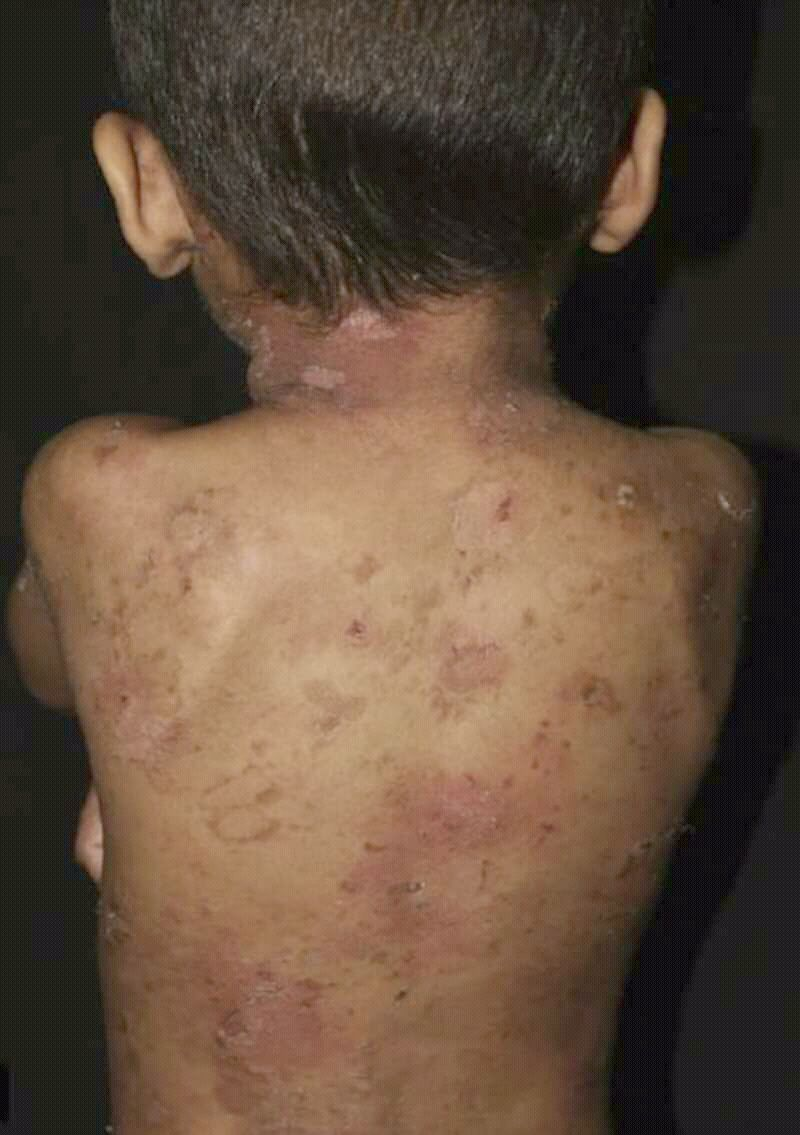
- Specialty: Medical genetics

Epidermolytic ichthyosis (EI), (Note: also known as bullous epidermis ichthyosis (BEI), epidermolytic hyperkeratosis (EHK), bullous congenital ichthyosiform erythroderma (BCIE), bullous ichtyosiform erythroderma congenita, bullous ichthyosiform erythroderma or bullous congenital ichthyosiform erythroderma Brocq,) is a severe form of dry scaly skin, that initially presents with redness, blisters, erosions, and peeling in a newborn baby. Hyperkeratosis typically develops several months later. Other symptoms include itch, painful fissures, strong body odor, and absence of sweat. Symptoms vary in severity and extent of skin involvement. The two main types are divided into one involving palms and soles and the other without.

EI is caused by a genetic mutation. The condition involves the clumping of keratin filaments.

The condition is rare, affecting around 1 in 200,000 to 300,000 babies.

== Signs and symptoms ==
EI is a severe form of dry scaly skin, that initially presents with redness, blisters, erosions, and peeling in a newborn baby. Hyperkeratosis typically develops several months later. Other symptoms include itch, painful fissures, body odor, and absence of sweat. Symptoms vary in severity and extent of skin involvement. Complications include infection and joint problems. Affected newborns are particularly at risk of dehydration, sepsis, and electrolyte imbalance.

== Cause and mechanism ==
The condition is mostly inherited in an autosomal dominant pattern. To a lesser extent, a recessive form exists. It is caused by genetic mutations in the genes encoding the proteins keratin 1 or keratin 10, resulting in disruption of the structure of the epidermis.

- Keratin 1 is associated with the variants affecting the palms and soles.
- Keratin 10 is associated with the variants in which these are unaffected.

== Diagnosis ==
Diagnosis is by its appearance, skin biopsy, and genetic testing.

The condition can be diagnosed via exam that reveals; generalized redness; thick, generally dark, scales that tend to form parallel rows of spines or ridges, especially near large joints; the skin is fragile and blisters easily following trauma; extent of blistering and amount of scale is variable.

== Treatment ==
Treatment includes applying thick moisturisers. Other therapies include topical and oral retinoids. These include topical N-acetylcysteine, liarozole, and calcipotriol. Bacterial colonisation of skin may be reduced by use of antibacterial soaps, chlorhexidine, and dilute sodium hypochlorite baths.

== Research ==
Gene therapy is being studied for EI.

== Epidemiology ==
The condition is rare, affecting around 1 in 200,000 to 300,000 babies.

== History ==
EI was first classified by its presence or absence in the palms and soles by DiGiovanna and Bale in 1994.

== See also ==
- Ichthyosis bullosa of Siemens
- Isotretinoin (Accutane)
- List of cutaneous conditions
- List of cutaneous conditions caused by mutations in keratins
- List of verrucous carcinoma subtypes
- Nonbullous ichthyosiform erythroderma
