= Variegate porphyria =

- Other names: Mixed hepatic porphyria, Mixed porphyria, South African genetic porphyria, and South African porphyria.
- Protoporphyrinogen IX
- Specialty: Endocrinology
- Symptoms: skin problems, Enzyme difficiency.
- Causes: genetic mutations.
- Treatment: liver transplants.

Variegate porphyria, also known by several other names, is an autosomal dominant porphyria that can have acute (severe but usually not long-lasting) symptoms along with symptoms that affect the skin. The disorder results from low levels of the enzyme responsible for the seventh step in heme production. Heme is a vital molecule for all of the body's organs. It is a component of hemoglobin, the molecule that carries oxygen in the blood.

== Signs and symptoms ==
When symptoms occur, they can include acute attacks (similar to acute intermittent porphyria) or skin damage. Acute attacks usually begin in adulthood and cause abdominal pain, vomiting, diarrhoea and constipation. During an attack, a person may also experience muscle weakness, seizures, and mental changes such as anxiety and hallucinations. These signs and symptoms are triggered by nongenetic factors such as certain drugs, dieting or fasting, certain hormones and stress.

Some people with variegate porphyria have skin that is overly sensitive to sunlight (photosensitive). Areas of skin exposed to the sun develop severe blistering, scarring, changes in pigmentation, and increased hair growth. Exposed skin becomes fragile and is easily damaged.

Rarely, the signs and symptoms of variegate porphyria can begin in infancy or early childhood. In such cases, the signs and symptoms are usually more severe than those starting later in life.

== Genetics ==
Variegate porphyria has an autosomal dominant pattern of inheritance.

Mutations in the PPOX gene cause variegate porphyria. The PPOX gene makes a membrane bound mitochondrial enzyme called protoporphyrinogen oxidase, which is critical to the chemical process that leads to heme production. The activity of this enzyme is reduced by 50 percent in most people with variegate porphyria. In severe cases that begin early in life, the enzyme is almost completely inactive. Nongenetic factors such as certain drugs, stress, and others listed above can increase the demand for heme and the enzymes required to make heme. The combination of this increased demand and reduced activity of protoporphyrinogen oxidase disrupts heme production and allows byproducts of the process to accumulate in the liver, triggering an acute attack.

Variegate porphyria is inherited in an autosomal dominant pattern, which means the defective gene is located on an autosome, and inheriting one copy of the defective gene from an affected parent is sufficient to cause the disorder. More severe cases result from inheriting two copies of the defective gene.

The entire PPOX gene has about 8kb with 13 exon sequences. It was successfully cloned from a cDNA library in 1995 revealing that, after processing, it is 477 nucleotides long. It has previously been thought that the PPOX gene was located on human chromosome 14, however mapping experiments (FISH) have shown that it is near 1q23. An additional aggravating mutation affecting variegate porphyria can be found at 6p21.3 on the HFE gene.

A 2006 clinical, biochemical and mutational study of eight Swiss variegate porphyria patients and their families found four novel PPOX gene mutations believed to be unique to the Swiss population.

== Diagnosis ==
Diagnosis is by finding raised urine porphyrins, raised faecal porphyrins, markedly raised plasma porphyrins (pathognomic) and finding photosensitive cutaneous lesions on clinical examination.

== Treatment ==
Liver transplant has been used in the treatment of this condition.

== Epidemiology ==
In South Africa, the prevalence of variegate porphyria is approximately 1 in 300. In Finland, the prevalence is approximately 1 in 75,000.

It is also found in Argentina, Sweden, and Australia.
