= Aminolevulinic acid dehydratase deficiency porphyria =

- Other names: Porphyria due to ALA dehydratase deficiency
- ALA dehydratase deficiency has an autosomal recessive pattern of inheritance.
- Specialty: Gastroenterology, dermatology, medical genetics, endocrinology
- Differential diagnosis: Lead poisoning, Tyrosinemia type I
- Frequency: 1-760,000,000

Aminolevulinic acid dehydratase deficiency porphyria (also known as Doss porphyria, plumboporphyria, or ADP) is an extremely rare autosomal recessive metabolic disorder that results from inappropriately low levels of the enzyme delta-aminolevulinic acid dehydratase (ALAD), which is required for normal heme synthesis. This deficiency results in the accumulation of a toxic metabolic precursor in the heme synthesis pathway called aminolevulinic acid (ALA). Lead poisoning can also disrupt ALAD and result in elevated ALA causing the same symptoms. Heme is a component of hemoglobin which carries oxygen in red blood cells.

ALA dehydratase deficiency is a rare cause of hepatic porphyria, meaning that excess porphyrins originate from the liver rather than the bone marrow as in erythropoietic porphyrias.

== Signs and symptoms ==
The clinical presentation of ADP includes a wide range of neurologic and gastrointestinal symptoms. The disease can present during early childhood (as well as in adulthood) with acute neurologic symptoms that resemble those encountered in acute intermittent porphyria. Patients can also have gastrointestinal symptoms during acute attacks, including abdominal cramping, vomiting, and constipation. Gastrointestinal symptoms can result in failure to thrive and poor weight gain in children. Other symptoms that can occur during an acute attack include a rapid heart beat, high blood pressure, and respiratory difficulties.

Acute attacks can last for weeks and are also called "neurovisceral" attacks due to the neurological complications associated. Patients have reported numbness and tingling in the extremities, seizures, burning pain, poor coordination, inability to move muscles voluntarily, and psychological disturbances. Psychosis, though rare, has occurred in severe instances.

Many triggers have been identified for acute ADP attacks including fasting, a low carb diet, dehydration, alcohol intake, the use of estrogen or progesterone, certain drugs, and other mental and physical stressors.

== Genetics ==
ALA dehydratase deficiency is inherited in an autosomal recessive manner.

In conditions where both parents are carriers:

- The risk of having a child with ADP is 25% for each pregnancy.
- The risk of having a child who is also a carrier is 50%.
- The chance of having a child who is unaffected and is not a carrier is 25%.

== Diagnosis ==
To make a diagnosis, the relevant presenting symptoms and a detailed patient history must be considered in addition to obtaining biomarkers in the urine or blood. These biomarkers include urine porphobilinogen (PBG), aminolevulinic acid (ALA), and porphyrins found in blood and urine. PBG levels fluctuate and are best measured during the onset of acute symptoms. ALA levels are increased in ADP and correlate with the severity of the disease.

If levels of porphyrins are significantly elevated, DNA testing can be performed to determine the specific mutations in the ALAD gene. DNA analysis is the most specific test for making a diagnosis of ADP.

Both lead poisoning and succinylacetone, whose levels are increased in tyrosinemia type I, inhibit ALAD. Therefore, these conditions should also be considered when elevated levels of porphyrins are found.

== Treatment ==
Supportive care and treatment of symptoms are the typical management options for ADP. During acute attacks, patients are often hospitalized and given medications for nausea/vomiting, rapid heartbeat, and hypertension while their fluid and electrolyte levels are monitored. Glucose supplementation and intravenous hematin are the mainstay of treatment for acute attacks. Avoiding physical and psychological stressors has been shown to limit the reoccurrence of attacks.

== Prevalence ==
The condition is extremely rare, with fewer than 10 cases ever reported. All reported cases have been seen in males. A feature of ADP that separates it from other porphyrias is that it is more prevalent in males than in females. However, it theoretically affects males and females at the same rate. Most cases have been identified in Europe but it can occur in any population.

== See also ==
- List of cutaneous conditions
