= Health of Vincent van Gogh =

Historical line of inquiry

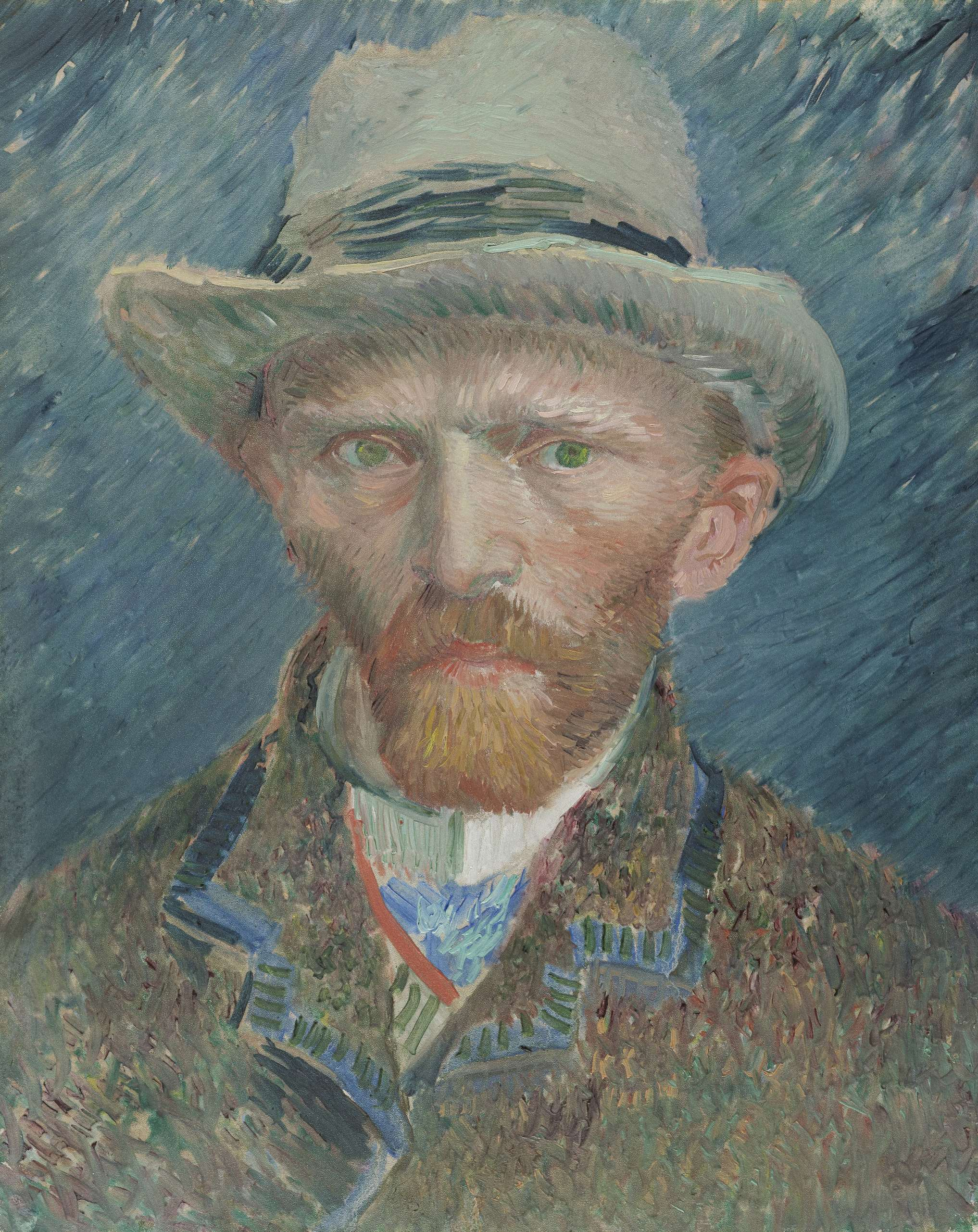
Winter 1886/87 (F 295) Oil on pasteboard, 41 x 32 cm Rijksmuseum, Amsterdam

There is no consensus on the state of Vincent van Gogh's physical and mental health, with many competing hypotheses advanced as to possible medical conditions that he may have had. These include epilepsy, bipolar disorder, borderline personality disorder, sunstroke, acute intermittent porphyria, lead poisoning, Ménière's disease, schizophrenia, schizoaffective disorder, substance use disorder, non-suicidal self-injury disorder ("self-harm"), and a possible generalized anxiety disorder. His death in 1890 is generally accepted to have been a suicide: infection from a self-inflicted gunshot wound to the chest.

== Symptoms and characteristics ==
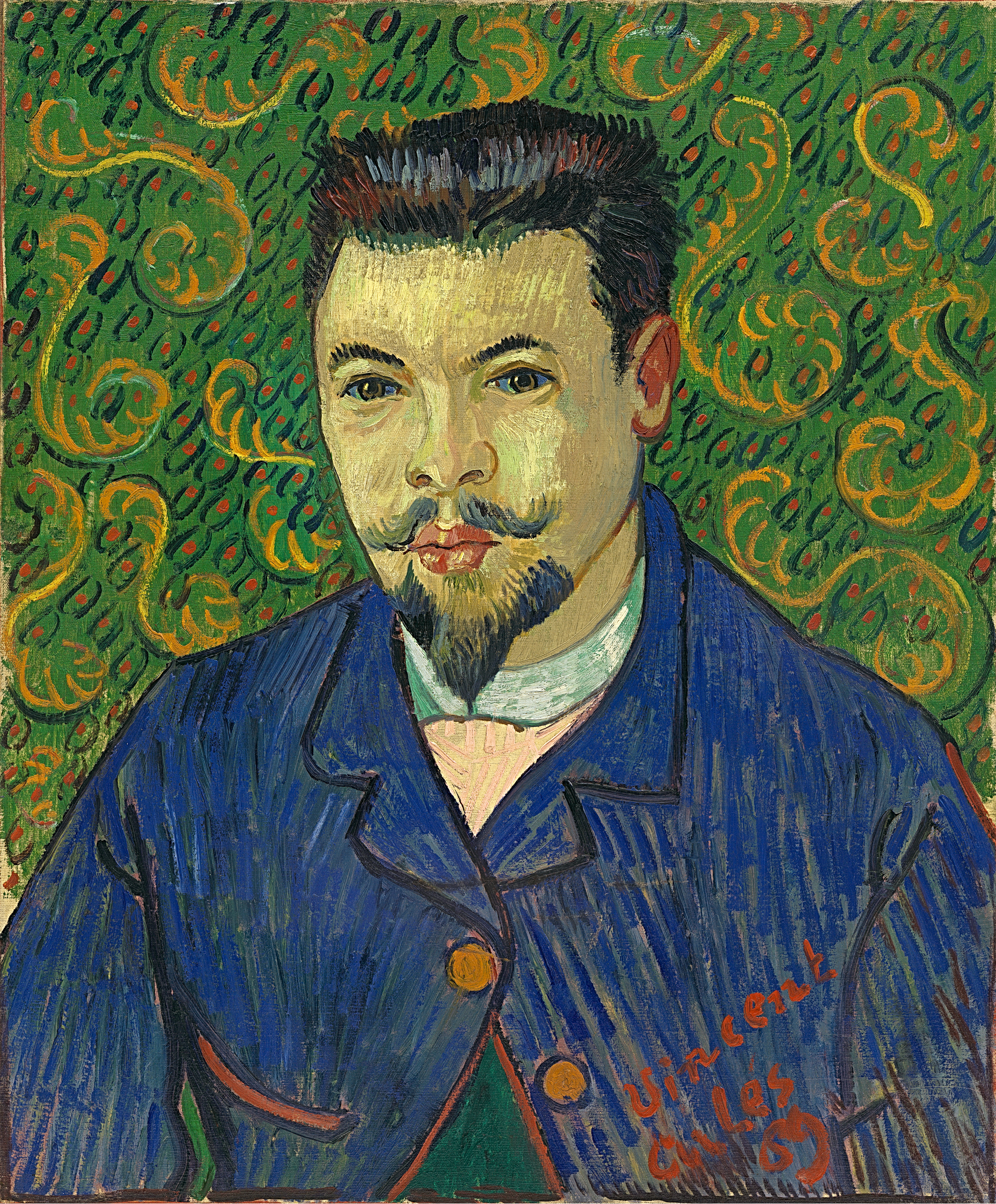
Portrait of Doctor Félix Rey (F500, JH1659), oil on canvas 1889, Pushkin Museum. Rey disliked his portrait and gave it away.

Various symptoms are described in Van Gogh's letters and other documents such as the asylum register at Saint-Rémy. The symptoms include: poor digestion and a bad stomach, hallucinations, nightmares, manic episodes, depressive episodes, stupor, absent-mindedness, impotence, insomnia, and anxiety.

Van Gogh suffered from some seizures or crises, and in one of these attacks, on 23 December 1888, he cut off a part, or possibly all, of his left ear. Following that attack, he was admitted to hospital in Arles, where his condition was diagnosed as "acute mania with generalized delirium". Dr. Félix Rey, a young intern at the hospital, also suggested there might be "a kind of epilepsy" involved that he characterized as mental epilepsy. These attacks became more frequent by 1890, the longest and most severe lasting some nine weeks from February to April 1890. Initial attacks of confusion and unconsciousness were followed by periods of stupor and incoherence, during which he was generally unable to paint, draw, or even write letters.

One of the most frequent complaints in Van Gogh's letters is the problems he endured with his stomach and poor digestion. Van Gogh suffered from hallucinations and nightmares at times. He often reported that he was suffering from fever. At various times he reported bouts of insomnia. He was unable to sleep for three weeks before his diagnosis of gonorrhea in The Hague (sleeplessness and fever probably due to infectious disease). On occasions he sunk into a kind of stupor. Van Gogh reported his impotence to Theo, his brother, in the summer after he arrived in Arles, and a month later, when he wrote to Bernard, it seemed to still be very much on his mind. Van Gogh mentioned suicide several times in his letters towards the end of his life; nevertheless, Naifeh and Smith note that Van Gogh was fundamentally opposed to suicide.

== Behavior ==
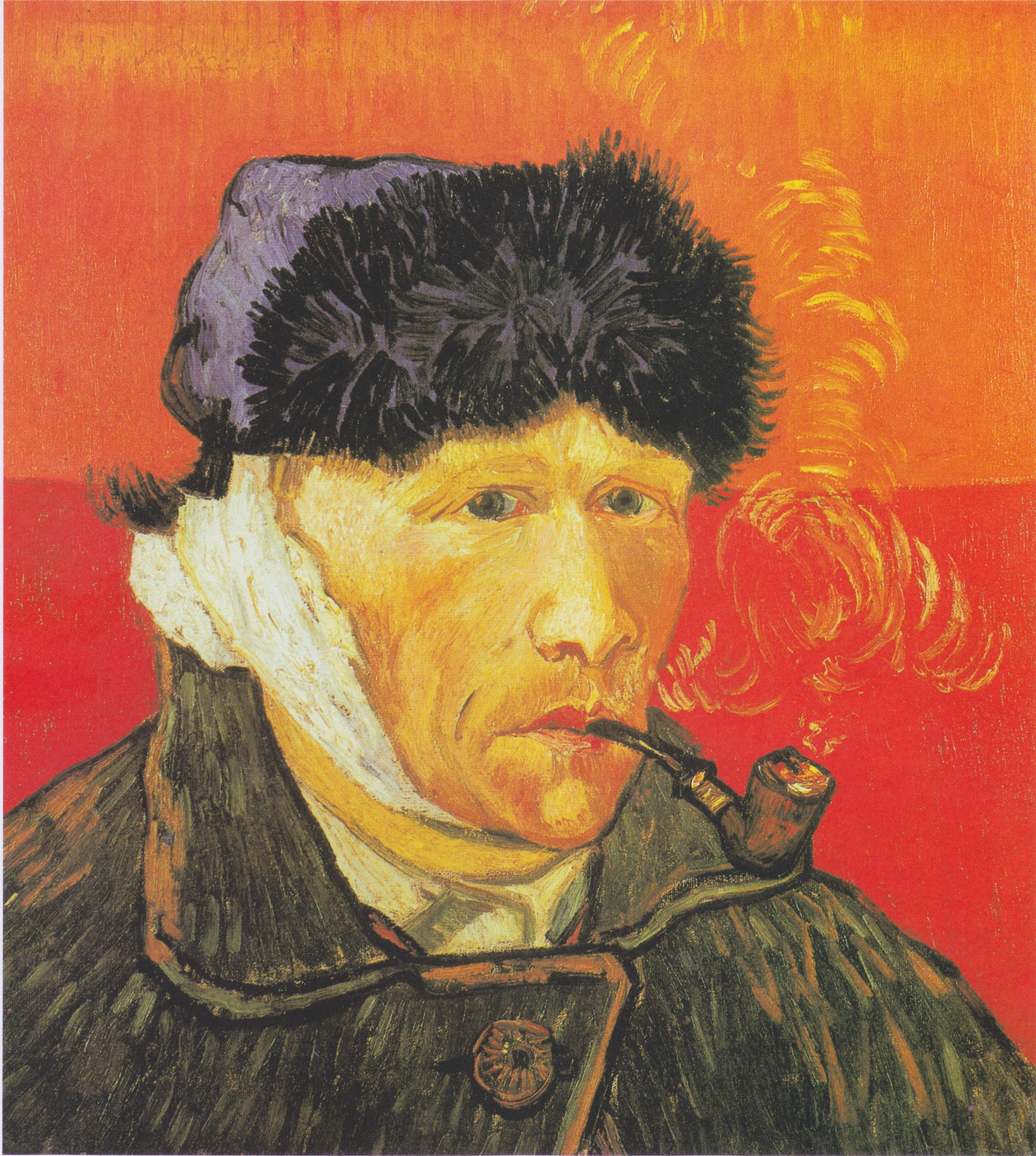
Self-portrait, 1889, private collection. Mirror-image self-portrait with bandaged ear

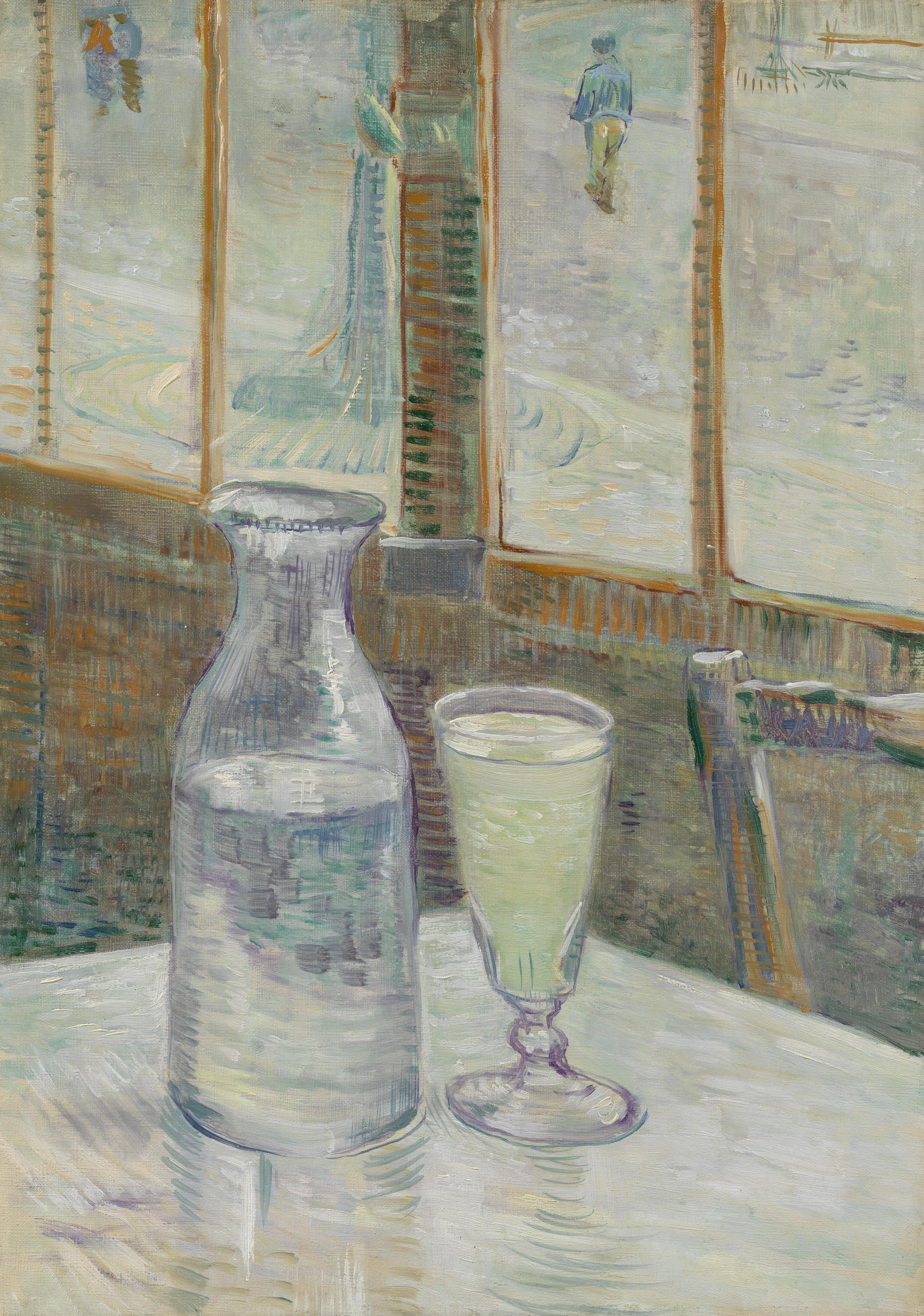
Still Life with Absinthe, 1887, Van Gogh Museum

Many analysts, such as American psychiatrist Dietrich Blumer, agree that one of the things Vincent van Gogh had was bipolar disorder. Bipolar disorder is characterized by manic and depressive episodes; manic episodes feature reckless behavior, euphoria, and impulsiveness. Depressive episodes feature symptoms of depression, anger, indecisiveness, social withdrawal, and often recurring thoughts of death or suicide. Many of these symptoms can be detected throughout his biography and explain many of his actions.

From a young age, Van Gogh grew up with a strong connection to painting and religion. After having worked at his uncle's art dealership in the Netherlands, he transferred to another dealership location in London, where he fell in love with his landlord's daughter, Eugenie Loyer. After she declined his marriage proposal, he had his first psychotic break, which caused him to change his entire life in order to devote it to God. This setback at age 20 certainly marked a first step in the downwards spiral representing his health, which would lead to his suicide in 1890. One author points out that "[T]here was a family history of mental illness", and Van Gogh displayed symptoms of bipolar disorder, in which heredity plays a significant role. Now an official devotee to the Church of Christ, Van Gogh aspired to become a priest. His disarranged life style, however, caused him nothing but disrespect and rejection, such as the rejection from several theology schools throughout Europe around 1878. Reports of his reckless and indecisive yet impulsive behavior all point towards bipolar disorder. Things like pursuing the work of an art salesman only to tell the customers "not to buy this worthless art" can be very well explained by the illness. Notions of indecisiveness and identity problems can be seen in the next years. Van Gogh moved frequently due to sexual rejection in the next 10 years. He moved to Brussels in 1880 to become an artist. He moved to The Hague because his cousin, Kate, rejected him. He moved to Paris in 1886 because his companion, Clasina Maria Hoornik, recommenced prostitution and alcohol addiction. Van Gogh found shelter in his brother Theo's small apartment, showing up on his doorstep uninvited. In Paris, it seemed that painting leveled and calmed his emotions.

Van Gogh indulged in various activities which undermined his health, such as constant smoking, excessive alcohol and coffee consumption, and eating poorly, even fasting at times. The natural consequence of all this was malnutrition. He was never without his pipe and smoked it even on his deathbed, and he admitted on several occasions that he smoked too much. He also drank alcohol to excess, particularly absinthe.

There is some evidence that Van Gogh nibbled at his paints, and the eating of paints is possibly connected with his seizure around New Year 1890. In January 1890, after another one of Vincent's seizures, Theo wrote to him, saying "if you know that it is dangerous for you to have colours near you, why don't you clear them away for a time, and make drawings?" Theo's alarm is somewhat reduced after hearing from Vincent, and five days later he explained:

In [Doctor Peyron's] first letter he gave me to understand that it was dangerous for you to go on painting, as the colours were poison to you, but he went a little too far, which might have been due to his having relied on unverified rumours, as he himself was ill at the time.

== Diagnoses ==
=== Epilepsy ===
Epilepsy has been a popular diagnosis. Van Gogh himself thought that he might have epilepsy and his doctor Dr. Félix Rey at the Old Hospital in Arles made the same general diagnosis, as did Dr. Peyron at St Rémy. A diagnosis of temporal lobe epilepsy was originally put forward in 1928 by Leroy and Doiteau and has received much support. Arnold states that the pattern of Van Gogh's seizures, their timing and duration, does not fit well with the complex partial seizures associated with temporal lobe epilepsy. Furthermore, it seems that Vincent's condition was controlled by the administration of bromide, which is effective against grand mal seizures, as well as absinthe intoxication and porphyria, but not for temporal lobe epilepsy.

=== Bipolar disorder ===
Perry in 1947 was the first to put together a serious case for a diagnosis of bipolar disorder, or "manic depression." It fits with the well documented periods of intense activity interspersed with periods of exhaustion and depression. It has been suggested that Van Gogh was not just bipolar, but that the crises in his last two years were brought about by the additional effect of thujone poisoning from his consumption of absinthe. Arnold has suggested the association between bipolar disorder and creativity is a popular one, and may be spurious in Van Gogh's case.

=== Borderline personality disorder ===
Van Gogh is believed by some to have had borderline personality disorder; he "displayed symptoms best consistent with a borderline (personality) disorder: impulsivity, variable moods, self-destructive behaviour, fear of abandonment, an unbalanced self-image, authority conflicts and other complicated relationships." Dutch psychiatrist Erwin van Meekeren proposed in his book, Starry Starry Night: Life and Psychiatric History of Vincent van Gogh, that borderline personality disorder is the most likely explanation for Van Gogh's behavior. Dr. John G. Gunderson, an expert on borderline personality disorder, concurred that Van Gogh's "longings for love, his sudden mood changes (and most particularly his seemingly unpredictable and unwarranted rages), and his pattern of impulsive acts, including substance abuse, are all recognizable components of the borderline syndrome...whether Van Gogh was borderline or not, it is a useful prism through which to view his troubled life."

=== Sunstroke ===
The possibility that Van Gogh might have suffered some form of chronic sunstroke was advocated strongly by Roch Grey. Vincent described the effects of the Arles sun in a letter: "Oh! that beautiful midsummer sun here. It beats down on one's head, and I haven't the slightest doubt that it makes one crazy. But as I was so to begin with, I only enjoy it." A month earlier he had mentioned the effects of the sun in passing in a letter to Theo:

Many thanks for your letter, which gave me great pleasure, arriving just exactly at the moment when I was still dazed with the sun and the strain of wrestling with a rather big canvas.

A remark has been attributed to Dr Gachet describing a diagnosis of "turpentine poisoning and the effects of too intense sun on a Nordic brain," but attempts to confirm this attribution have failed.

=== Ménière's disease ===
The hypothesis that Vincent may have suffered from Ménière's disease — a balance disorder of the inner ear which is accompanied by nausea, vomiting, hearing loss, and vertigo — was first published in 1979 by Yasuda. This idea then reappeared in 1990 in the Journal of the American Medical Association (JAMA). Arnold refutes the hypothesis, stating that there is no case for Ménière's, and that the logic of the JAMA article was flawed in that it put forward only epilepsy as an alternative diagnosis. The Ménière's diagnosis relies on interpreting Van Gogh's gastrointestinal problems as the nausea and vomiting associated with Ménière's. The JAMA article's suggestion that Vincent's cutting of his ear was an attempt at self-performed surgery to relieve the Ménière's symptom of tinnitus has been regarded as far-fetched.

=== Lead poisoning ===
According to a doctoral thesis in 1991, Van Gogh used in his impasto technique lead pigments in an abusive and careless way, and some months later he suffered the key symptoms of lead poisoning (anemia, stomatitis, abdominal pain, signs of radial neuropathy, etc.) and other characteristics of saturnine encephalopathy in Arles with states of delirium and probable epileptic crises, which were diagnosed in life. Regardless of the premorbid personality of Vincent (impulsive and emotionally unstable), these crises with disturbance of consciousness or psychotic symptoms coincided with his prolific artistic activity, and never in the North; as the Dutch painter says in a letter (Letter 607). Other painters exposed to toxic colors suffered lead poisoning. However, this thesis could be confirmed only by a forensic examination of the bones of Van Gogh, as Caravaggio's remains were. Recent chemical research on toxic lead pigments used recklessly by Van Gogh reinforces the diagnosis of saturnism.

=== Acute intermittent porphyria ===
Arnold and Loftus put forward the diagnosis of acute intermittent porphyria (often referred to as simply "AIP"). Arnold suggests the AIP was exacerbated by malnutrition and absinthe abuse. He cites two case histories of men in their 30s who were demonstrated to have AIP and displayed some symptoms similar to those of Van Gogh, including depression and hallucinations in one case, and complex partial seizures in the other.

However, Erickson and others refute this diagnosis arguing that the key symptom of urine discoloration was never noted, and that van Gogh's "bad stomach" does not match the commonly experienced "excruciating abdominal pain" associated with AIP.

Erickson and Arnold disagree as to the support offered by the family history, and in particular regarding the status of Vincent's father's health: Arnold, basing his opinion on Tralbaut, believes Theodorus to have been in not-very-good health for most of his life, whereas Erickson chooses to see him as being essentially an active man until a relatively sudden death at age 63. Arnold suggests that Theodorus' quiet and balanced life meant that he avoided several factors that precipitated symptoms and progress of the disorder in his children.

In any case, the hereditary defect of this rare disease is not confirmed in Theo's descendants. However, lead poisoning can cause symptoms similar to the AIP with crisis also exacerbated by malnutrition or alcohol.

=== Schizophrenia ===
Some authors have tentatively diagnosed Van Gogh with schizophrenia, mostly due to his auditory hallucinations. Others find it improbable however, because his psychosis was episodic, not chronic.

=== Schizoaffective disorder ===
Yasmeen Cooper and Mark Agius have suggested that Van Gogh suffered from schizoaffective disorder; bipolar type, due to his bouts of psychosis, mania, and major depression.

=== Substance use disorder ===
Van Gogh has been suggested as being an alcoholic due to his heavy absinthe usage. Van Gogh was also a heavy tobacco user.

=== Anxiety disorder ===
Van Gogh suffered from "fits of anxiety" and irritability.

=== Non-suicidal self-injury disorder ===
Van Gogh had a history of self-harm, even before his infamous cutting of his own ear in 1888.

Non-suicidal self-injury disorder is a proposed mental disorder in the Diagnostic and Statistical Manual of Mental Disorders 5.

=== Other diagnoses ===
It is speculated that Vincent and Theo had syphilis; indeed, Vincent was treated for gonorrhea in 1882. But according to Theo's death certificate, the cause of death was a "chronic kidney disease" for possible "kidney stones". On the other hand, recognized psychiatric research rules out that Vincent had suffered a mental disorder by syphilis. Moreover, assuming that both brothers had contracted syphilis in the brothels of Paris (March 1886 – February 1888), it is impossible that they developed so quickly neurosyphilis mental disorder, which occurs 10 to 20 years after infection. Dr. Cavenaille diagnosed the artist with "syphilis", according to his grandson, but this diagnosis was not confirmed by the physicians caring for Vincent in the hospital (Dr. Urpar, Dr. Rey, and Dr. Peyron) or Dr. Gachet in Auvers.

A complex disease, it has been speculated that it fits all his symptoms, in concert with absinthe intoxication. But doctors who treated Vincent, and who were familiar with absinthe drinkers, did not diagnose Vincent as an "absintheur". Hulsker also denies Vincent's addiction to absinthe. Additionally, recent research reveals that the thujone of liquor is safer than alcohol.

It has been postulated that Van Gogh may have exhibited a form of digoxin toxicity from the foxglove plants used to treat his epilepsy. His yellow period ("yellow vision"), missing ear ("oto-toxicity") and penchant for painting halos around landscape objects ("halo vision") are often used by medical students as a mnemonic to remember the sequelae of digoxin toxicity. Speculation has been further fueled by Van Gogh's portrait of his physician, Dr. Paul-Ferdinand Gachet (1890), in which Gachet holds Digitalis purpurea. However, Van Gogh was not treated with digitalis, and Dr. Arnold dismisses the plant as a cause of xanthopsia (yellow halos).

== Bibliography ==
- Arnold, Wilfred N. (1992). Vincent van Gogh: Chemicals, Crises, and Creativity. Boston: Birkhãuser. ISBN 0-8176-3616-1.
- Hayden, Deborah Pox: Genius, Madness, and the Mysteries of Syphilis, Basic Books, 2003, ISBN 0-465-02882-9
- Hulsker, Jan (1980). The Complete Van Gogh. Oxford: Phaidon. ISBN 0-7148-2028-8.
- Gunderson, John G. (2008). Borderline Personality Disorder, Second Edition: A Clinical Guide. American Psychiatric Publishing.
- Naifeh, Steven; Smith, Gregory White (2011). Van Gogh: The Life. Profile Books. ISBN 978-1-84668-010-6.
- Van Meekeren, Erwin. Starry Starry Night: Life and Psychiatric History of Vincent van Gogh. Benecke N.I., Amsterdam, 2013.
