= Watson–Schwartz test =

Medical screening test

The Watson–Schwartz test is a screening test for diagnosing intermittent porphyria, although it might also become positive in porphyria cutanea tarda (a skin form of porphyria). In this method, porphobilinogen is detected by a color reaction with Ehrlich reagent and confirming that the color is not removed by chloroform. As the test is just a screening test, it usually is confirmed by a more specific test such as a Hoesch test.
