= Porphyric hemophilia =

Porphyric hemophilia may refer to:

- Porphyria, a group of diseases in which substances called porphyrins build up
- Vampirism, a term describing being a vampire
