= FPCT =

FPCT could mean:

- familial porphyria cutanea tarda, a medical term for an enzyme disorder
- Fells Point Corner Theatre, a community theatre in Baltimore, Maryland
- Fielding percentage, a baseball term
- Flat panel computed tomography, a medical technology term
