= Heme arginate =

Identifiers
| CAS Number | 100438-92-4 |
| 3D model (JSmol) | Interactive image |
| DrugBank | DB17310 |
| MeSH | Heme+arginate |
| PubChem CID | 3086464 |
| UNII | R1B526117P |
- InChI: InChI=1S/C34H34N4O4.C6H14N4O2.Fe/c1-7-21-17(3)25-13-26-19(5)23(9-11-33(39)40)31(37-26)16-32-24(10-12-34(41)42)20(6)28(38-32)15-30-22(8-2)18(4)27(36-30)14-29(21)35-25;7-4(5(11)12)2-1-3-10-6(8)9;/h7-8,13-16,35-36H,1-2,9-12H2,3-6H3,(H,39,40)(H,41,42);4H,1-3,7H2,(H,11,12)(H4,8,9,10);/q;;+2/t;4-;/m.0./s1 Key: MGQITOFVXOEWNL-INZIHYEWSA-N
- SMILES: CC1=C(C2=CC3=NC(=CC4=NC(=CC5=C(C(=C(N5)C=C1N2)C=C)C)C(=C4CCC(=O)O)C)C(=C3C)CCC(=O)O)C=C.C(C[C@@H](C(=O)O)N)CN=C(N)N.[Fe+2]

Properties
| Chemical formula | C_{40}H_{48}FeN_{8}O_{6}^{+2} |
| Molar mass | 792.704 |
- Except where otherwise noted, data are given for materials in their standard state (at 25 °C [77 °F], 100 kPa). verify (what is ?) Infobox references

Heme arginate (or haem arginate) is a compound of heme and arginine used in the treatment of acute porphyrias. This heme product is only available outside the United States and is equivalent to hematin.

Heme arginate is a heme compound, whereby L-arginine is added to prevent rapid degradation. It is given intravenously, and its action of mechanism is to reduce the overproduction of δ-aminolevulinic acid, which can cause the acute symptoms in an attack of the acute porphyrias.

== See also ==
- Acute intermittent porphyria
- Aminolevulinic acid
- Inborn error of metabolism
