= Succinylacetone =

Names
- Preferred IUPAC name 4,6-Dioxoheptanoic acid
- Other names Succinyl acetone

Identifiers
CAS Number	51568-18-4
3D model (JSmol)	Interactive image
ChEBI	CHEBI:87897
ChEMBL	ChEMBL222824
ChemSpider	5121
ECHA InfoCard	100.153.292
EC Number	624-726-8
PubChem CID	5312
UNII	KZ0KV2Q190
CompTox Dashboard (EPA)	DTXSID50199519
- InChI: InChI=1S/C7H10O4/c1-5(8)4-6(9)2-3-7(10)11/h2-4H2,1H3,(H,10,11) Key: WYEPBHZLDUPIOD-UHFFFAOYSA-N
- SMILES: CC(=O)CC(=O)CCC(=O)O

Properties
Chemical formula	C_{7}H_{10}O_{4}
Molar mass	158.153 g·mol^{−1}

Hazards
- GHS labelling
Pictograms	(GHS07: Exclamation mark)
Signal word	Warning
Hazard statements	H315, H319, H335
Precautionary statements	P261, P264, P264+P265, P271, P280, P302+P352, P304+P340, P305+P351+P338, P319, P321, P332+P317, P337+P317, P362+P364, P403+P233, P405, P501
- Except where otherwise noted, data are given for materials in their standard state (at 25 °C [77 °F], 100 kPa). Infobox references

Succinylacetone is a toxic organic compound that arises as an abnormal metabolite in tyrosine catabolism. In normal tyrosine catabolism, fumarylacetoacetate hydrolase converts fumarylacetoacetate to fumarate and acetoacetate. Deficiency of fumarylacetoacetate hydrolase leads to the accumulation of fumarylacetoacetate, which is subsequently converted to succinylacetoacetate. Succinylacetoacetate is then decarboxylated to form succinylacetone.

Patients with tyrosinemia type 1 have a congenital deficiency of fumarylacetoacetate hydrolase, resulting in the accumulation of succinylacetone in blood and urine. Elevated levels of succinylacetone, with or without elevations of tyrosine, are indicative of tyrosinemia type 1. Measurement of succinylacetone is the preferred marker in newborn screening of Tyrosinemia Type 1 due to its high sensitivity and specificity. Succinylacetone can also be detected in the urine through LCMS or GCMS.

Succinylacetone also inhibits ALA dehydratase (PBG synthase), an enzyme involved in porphyrin and heme synthesis. This results in increased ALA levels and, in certain patients, precipitates acute neuropathic symptoms, similar to porphyria. Decreased heme concentration can also be seen as a result of this potent inhibition
