= Pseudoporphyria =

- Other names: Pseudoporphyria cutanea tarda
- Healing blisters on the hand of a woman using naproxen and tanning booth
- Specialty: Endocrinology

Pseudoporphyria is a bullous photosensitivity that clinically and histologically mimics porphyria cutanea tarda. The difference is that no abnormalities in urine or serum porphyrin is noted on laboratories. Pseudoporphyria has been reported in patients with chronic kidney failure treated with hemodialysis and in those with excessive exposure to ultraviolet A (UV-A) by tanning beds.

== Presentation ==
Pseudoporphyria is clinically characterized by increased skin fragility; erythema; and the appearance of tense bullae and erosions on sun-exposed skin, which are identical to those seen in patients with PCT. However, a clinical pearl that may prove helpful in differentiating between pseudoporphyria and PCT is that the classic features of hypertrichosis, hyperpigmentation, and sclerodermoid changes found with PCT are unusual with pseudoporphyria. A second clinical pattern of pseudoporphyria has a similar presentation to erythropoietic protoporphyria (EPP), an autosomal dominant porphyria resulting from a reduced activity of ferrochelatase.

In contrast to PCT, EPP usually begins in childhood with a history of photosensitivity, often described as a burning sensation immediately after sunlight exposure. Clinically, EPP is characterized by erythema, edema, shallow scars, and waxy induration of the skin, particularly on the face. Pseudoporphyria that clinically mimics EPP has been described almost exclusively in children taking naproxen for juvenile rheumatoid arthritis. Naproxen-induced pseudoporphyria seems to have a dimorphic presentation with the PCT-like pattern more often seen in the adult population and the EPP-like pattern more commonly seen in children, although some overlap has been documented.

=== Race ===
Although pseudoporphyria has no predilection toward any one race, it has been shown that fair-skinned children who are highly prone to sunburn are more likely to develop naproxen-induced pseudoporphyria than those children with skin types III or higher. Wallace et al. demonstrated that even in the absence of a history of blistering, children with light skin and blue or green eyes are at an increased risk of developing shallow scars on the face while taking naproxen.

== Causes ==
Pseudoporphyria can be induced by a wide range of medications, excessive UV-A exposure, and hemodialysis. One frequently reported drug is naproxen. A frequent source of UV-A exposure is tanning booths.

As recognition of pseudoporphyria increases and the number of new medications expands, the list of etiologic agents associated with pseudoporphyria will most likely continue to grow. Agents associated with pseudoporphyria are as follows:

- Propionic acid derivatives (NSAIDs) - naproxen, diflunisal, ketoprofen, oxaprozin, mefenamic acid, rofecoxib
- Ketone NSAID-nabumetone
- Antibiotics - nalidixic acid, tetracycline, oxytetracycline, ampicillin-sulbactam, cefepime, fluoroquinolones (M Poh, personal communication, June 1999)
- Antifungals - voriconazole
- Diuretics - furosemide, chlorthalidone, butamide, triamterene/hydrochlorothiazide
- Antiarrhythmics - amiodarone
- Chemotherapy - 5-fluorouracil
- Immunosuppressants - cyclosporine
- Sulfones - dapsone
- Vitamins - brewers' yeast, pyridoxine
- Vitamin A derivatives - etretinate, isotretinoin
- Muscle relaxants - carisoprodol/aspirin
- Nonsteroidal antiandrogens - flutamide
- Other - hemodialysis, excessive UV-A, cola, oral contraceptive pills (levonorgestrel and ethinylestradiol), narrowband UV-B phototherapy (rarely)

== Pathophysiology ==
The precise pathophysiologic mechanism of pseudoporphyria is not fully understood. Some drugs, especially non steroidal anti-inflammatory drugs, can trigger pseudoporphyria in the presence of ultraviolet light.

The pathophysiology of pseudoporphyria associated with hemodialysis has not been fully explained. Aluminum hydroxide has been implicated in hemodialysis-associated pseudoporphyria. Aluminum hydroxide is found in dialysis solution and has been shown to produce a porphyrialike disorder after long-term administration in rats.

== Treatment ==
Sun avoidance, avoidance of tanning booths, and usage of broad spectrum sunscreen that blocks both UVA and UVB.

Identification and avoidance of the offending drug.

== Frequency ==
Although fewer than 100 cases are documented in English language literature, pseudoporphyria is most likely underreported in the literature because it is only a symptom of some other condition, e.g. side effect of medicine or symptom of liver problems. As the symptoms of pseudoporhphyra have other names, those symptoms are mentioned.

The rarity of porphyria in modern times also makes the use of the term pseudoporphyria obscure.

== History ==
A careful history is of utmost importance when the diagnosis of pseudoporphyria is being considered. A personal and family history of hepatitis, porphyria, or photosensitivity disorder must be sought. Although a genetic factor has not been considered in pseudoporphyria, one case of monozygotic twins developing pseudoporphyria after excessive UV-A exposure from long-term tanning bed use has been documented. The patient should be thoroughly questioned regarding any symptoms of connective tissue disorder, which may be the underlying pathology of the photosensitivity. Recent reports suggest that a connective tissue disorder may be a predisposing factor in patients using nonsteroidal anti-inflammatory drugs (NSAIDs) who develop pseudoporphyria.
