= Tin mesoporphyrin =

Compound in biochemistry

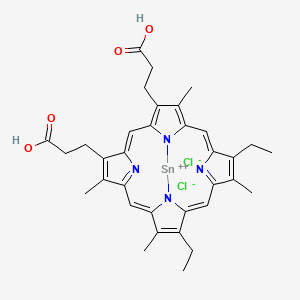

Names
- IUPAC name Dichloridotin(IV) 3-[18-(2-carboxyethyl)-8,13-diethyl-3,7,12,17-tetramethylporphyrin-21,24-diid-2-yl]propanoic acid

Identifiers
CAS Number	106344-20-1
3D model (JSmol)	Interactive image
ChemSpider	8094153
DrugBank	DB04912
PubChem CID	15978579
UNII	0KAE1U0G7Q
- InChI: InChI=1S/C34H38N4O4.2ClH.Sn/c1-7-21-17(3)25-13-26-19(5)23(9-11-33(39)40)31(37-26)16-32-24(10-12-34(41)42)20(6)28(38-32)15-30-22(8-2)18(4)27(36-30)14-29(21)35-25;;;/h13-16H,7-12H2,1-6H3,(H4,35,36,37,38,39,40,41,42);2*1H;/q;;;+4/p-4 Key: LLDZJTIZVZFNCM-UHFFFAOYSA-J
- SMILES: CCC1=C(C2=NC1=CC3=C(C(=C([N-]3)C=C4C(=C(C(=CC5=NC(=C2)C(=C5C)CC)[N-]4)C)CCC(=O)O)CCC(=O)O)C)C.[Cl-].[Cl-].[Sn+4]
- Except where otherwise noted, data are given for materials in their standard state (at 25 °C [77 °F], 100 kPa). Infobox references

Tin mesoporphyrin (SnMP), also known as stannsoporfin, is a metalloporphyrin, which inhibits heme oxygenase. It can be used in the treatment of neonatal hyperbilirubinemia.

== Structure ==
As the name, tin mesoporphyrin, suggests, the overall structure is very similar to the naturally occurring heme molecule. It consists of a ring structured protoporphyrin IX molecule that has tin as its central atom. As this is a synthetic molecule, the two vinyl groups at both the C2 and C4 positions on the porphyrin macrocyle are reduced to form ethyl groups that is found on tin mesoporphyrin. The molecular weight of tin mesoporphyrin is 754.3 g/mol.

== Mechanism ==
In the heme catabolic pathway, heme oxygenase catalyzes the breakdown of heme to biliverdin and well as carbon monoxide that is exhaled. Biliverdin is then converted to bilirubin with biliverdin reductase. As high biliverdin levels are usually related to bilirubinemia, tin mesoporphyrin has been found to aid in treatment and prevention of this, primarily in newborn infants. Tin mesoporphyrin competitively inhibits the heme oxygenase enzyme, which prevents the breakdown of heme to biliverdin leading to accumulation of heme and not bilirubin.

== Application ==
The application of stannsoporfin or tin mesoporphyrin is currently still being researched. Clinical studies have outlined its use in the treatment of hyperbilirubinemia infants and also the prevention of neonatal jaundice. It has also been found to reduce edema and hematoma in spontaneous intracerebral hemorrhage(ICH) from patients who suffered traumatic brain injuries.

=== Treatment in hyperbilirubinemia ===
In one study, tin mesoporphyrin was administered intramuscularly to a newborn that was only 46 hours old with a low birth weight who had also suffered from severe hyperbilirubinemia. Along with blue light treatment, the newborn showed a steady decrease in its total serum biliverdin within 10 hours after administration.

=== Prevention of neonatal jaundice ===
It has also been found that tin mesoporphyrin can aid in the prevention of neonatal jaundice. When administered to pre-discharge newborns who were at risk for neonatal jaundice the results showed a decrease in total biliverdin load, the possibility of postnatal bilirubin progression, as well as the use and duration of phototherapy.

=== Treatment in spontaneous intracerebral hemorrhage ===
Tin mesoporphyrin has also been found potentially reduce intracerebral mass in intracerebral hemorrhage cases by decreasing the hematoma and edema volumes.
