= Delta-aminolevulinic acid dehydratase =

Protein-coding gene in the species Homo sapiens

ALAD
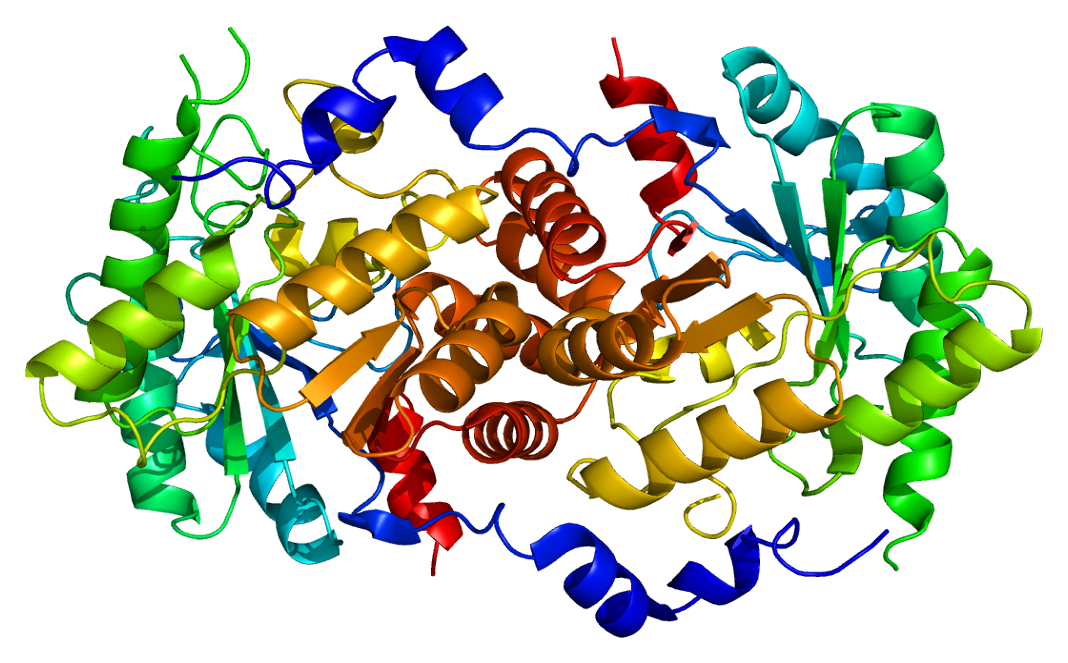
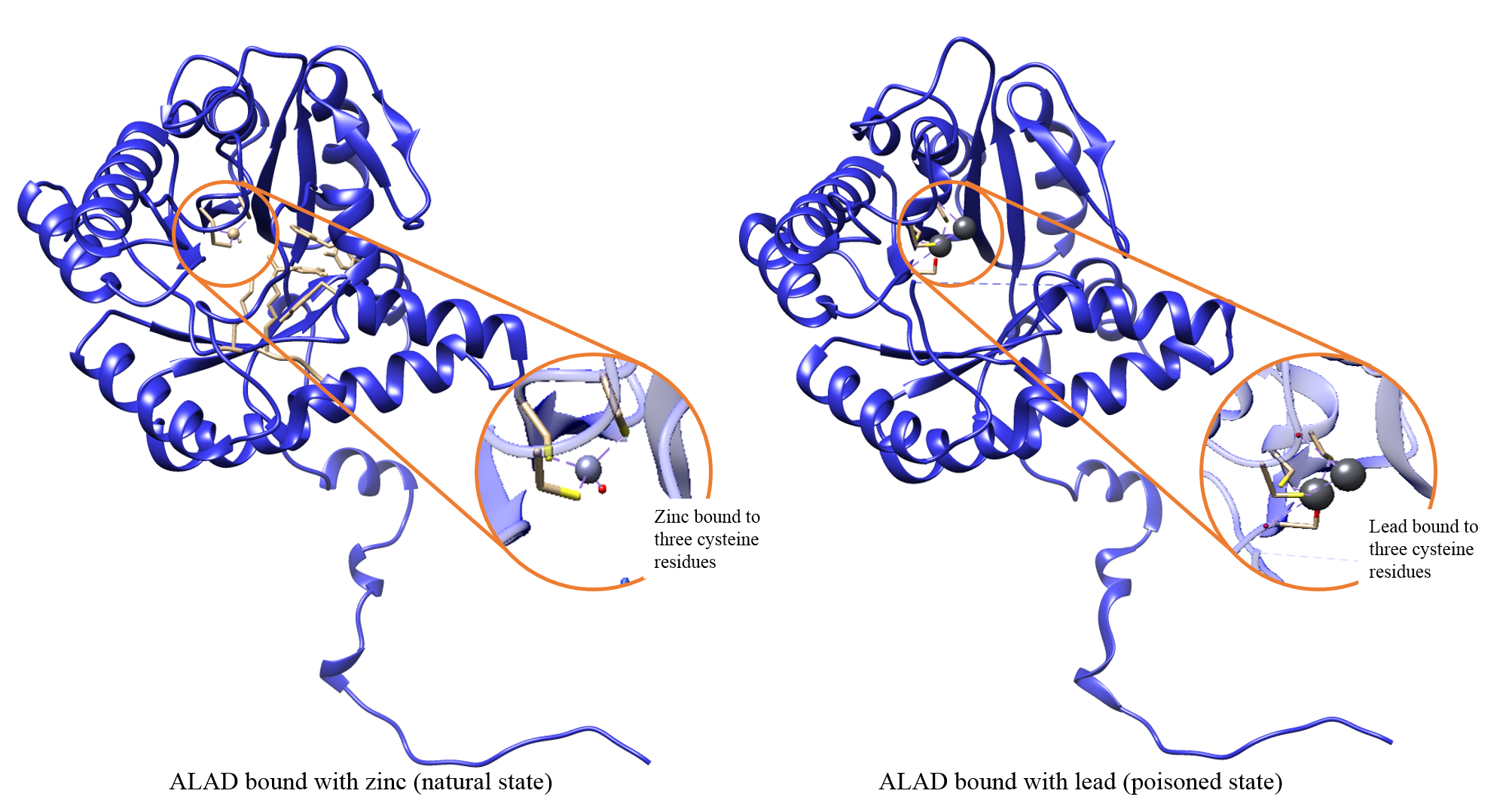

Identifiers
- Aliases: ALAD, ALADH, PBGS, aminolevulinate dehydratase, ALA dehydratase
- External IDs: OMIM: 125270; MGI: 96853; GeneCards: ALAD
Available structures
PDB	Ortholog search: PDBe RCSB
PDB	List of PDB id codes 1E51, 1PV8, 5HNR, 5HMS
Enzyme activity
EC #	BRENDA	ExPASy	KEGG	MetaCyc
4.2.1.24	↗	↗	↗	↗

Gene location (Human)
Chr.	Chromosome 9 (human)
Band	9q32	Start	113,386,312 bp
Band	9q32	End	113,401,290 bp

Gene location (Mouse)
Chr.	Chromosome 4 (mouse)
Band	4 B3|4 33.17 cM	Start	62,427,406 bp
Band	4 B3|4 33.17 cM	End	62,438,155 bp
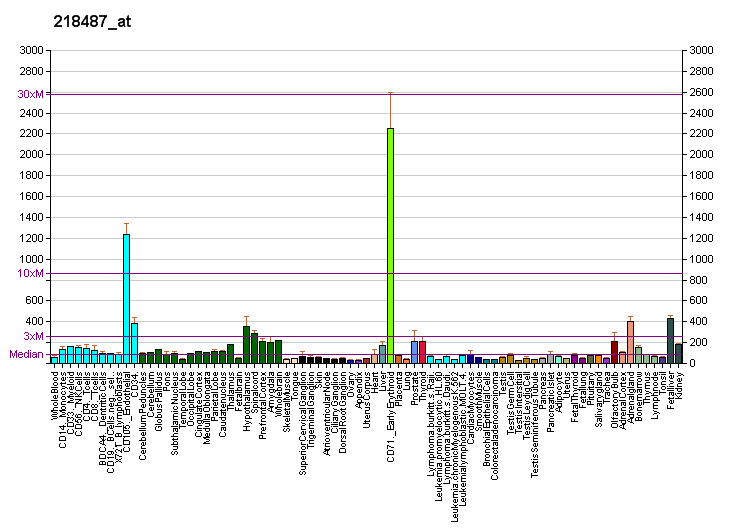

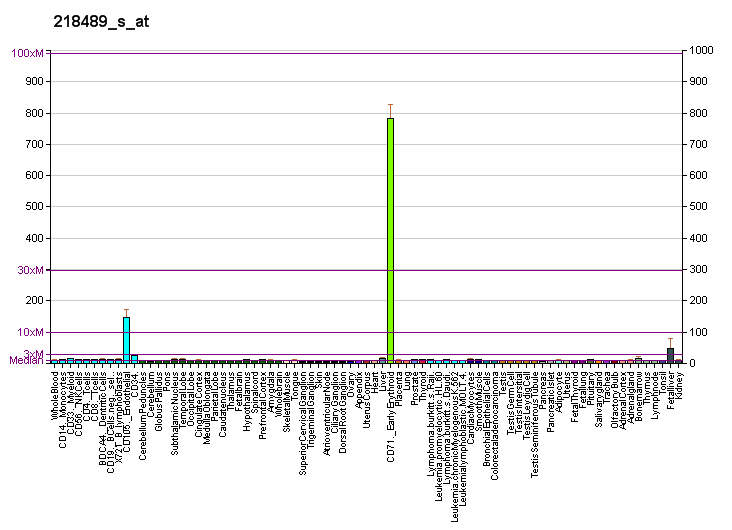
RNA expression pattern
Bgee	Human / Mouse (ortholog); Top expressed in: right adrenal gland; right adrenal cortex; left adrenal gland; left adrenal cortex; C1 segment; inferior olivary nucleus; dorsal motor nucleus of vagus nerve; parotid gland; trabecular bone; right lobe of liver / Top expressed in: fetal liver hematopoietic progenitor cell; vestibular membrane of cochlear duct; epithelium of lens; left lobe of liver; vestibular sensory epithelium; human fetus; corneal stroma; right kidney; yolk sac; efferent ductule; More reference expression data
BioGPS	More reference expression data
Gene ontology
Molecular function	porphobilinogen synthase activity; zinc ion binding; metal ion binding; catalytic activity; lyase activity; identical protein binding; proteasome core complex binding
Cellular component	cytosol; extracellular exosome; nucleus; extracellular region; extracellular space; secretory granule lumen; ficolin-1-rich granule lumen; proteasome core complex
Biological process	cellular response to interleukin-4; response to ionizing radiation; response to platinum ion; response to selenium ion; response to amino acid; cellular response to lead ion; response to hypoxia; response to cadmium ion; response to fatty acid; response to vitamin B1; response to organic cyclic compound; response to vitamin; response to nutrient; response to metal ion; response to zinc ion; response to glucocorticoid; response to arsenic-containing substance; protoporphyrinogen IX biosynthetic process; response to oxidative stress; response to organic substance; response to activity; tetrapyrrole biosynthetic process; porphyrin-containing compound biosynthetic process; response to vitamin E; response to iron ion; heme biosynthetic process; response to lipopolysaccharide; response to nutrient levels; response to lead ion; response to inorganic substance; response to aluminum ion; response to hormone; response to mercury ion; metabolism; response to methylmercury; response to ethanol; response to cobalt ion; protein homooligomerization; response to toxic substance; response to herbicide; neutrophil degranulation; negative regulation of proteasomal protein catabolic process
Sources:Amigo / QuickGO
Orthologs
Databases	NCBI: entry; OMA: entry
Species	Human	Mouse
Entrez	210	17025
Ensembl	ENSG00000148218	ENSMUSG00000028393
UniProt	P13716	P10518
RefSeq (mRNA)	NM_000031; NM_001003945; NM_001317745	NM_001276446; NM_008525
RefSeq (protein)	NP_000022; NP_001003945; NP_001304674	NP_001263375; NP_032551
Location (UCSC)	Chr 9: 113.39 – 113.4 Mb	Chr 4: 62.43 – 62.44 Mb
PubMed search
- Wikidata
View/Edit Human	View/Edit Mouse

Aminolevulinic acid dehydratase (porphobilinogen synthase, or ALA dehydratase, or aminolevulinate dehydratase) is an enzyme (EC 4.2.1.24) that in humans is encoded by the ALAD gene. Porphobilinogen synthase (or ALA dehydratase, or aminolevulinate dehydratase) synthesizes porphobilinogen through the asymmetric condensation of two molecules of aminolevulinic acid. All natural tetrapyrroles, including hemes, chlorophylls and vitamin B_{12}, share porphobilinogen as a common precursor. Porphobilinogen synthase is the prototype morpheein.

== Function ==
It catalyzes the following reaction, the second step of the biosynthesis of porphyrins:

2
aminolevulinic acid
2 H_{2}O
porphobilinogen

Two molecules of aminolevulinic acid are condensed to form porphobilinogen (a precursor of heme, cytochromes and other hemoproteins). This reaction is the first common step in the biosynthesis of all biological tetrapyrroles. In humans, zinc is essential for enzymatic activity.

== Structure ==
The structural basis for allosteric regulation of Porphobilinogen synthase (PBGS) is modulation of a quaternary structure equilibrium between octamer and hexamer (via dimers), which is represented schematically as 6mer* ↔ 2mer* ↔ 2mer ↔ 8mer. The * represents a reorientation between two domains of each subunit that occurs in the dissociated state because it is sterically forbidden in the larger multimers.

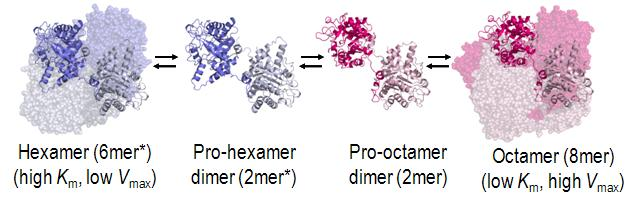
The PBGS quaternary structure equilibrium includes an inactive hexamer (PDB id 1PV8) that does not have subunit interactions necessary for an ordered active site lid. Dissociation to the pro-hexamer dimer can be followed by a conformational change that reorients the two αβ-barrel domains to form the pro-octamer dimer. Association of pro-octamer dimer to octamer (PDB id 1E51) includes formation of subunit interfaces that support order in the active site lid.

PBGS is encoded by a single gene and each PBGS multimer is composed of multiple copies of the same protein. Each PBGS subunit consists of a ~300 residue αβ-barrel domain, which houses the enzyme's active site in its center, and a >25 residue N-terminal arm domain. Allosteric regulation of PBGS can be described in terms of the orientation of the αβ-barrel domain with respect to the N-terminal arm domain.

Each N-terminal arm has up to two interactions with other subunits in a PBGS multimer. One of these interactions helps to stabilize a "closed" conformation of the active site lid. The other interaction restricts solvent access from the other end of the αβ-barrel.

In the inactive multimeric state, the N-terminal arm domain is not involved in the lid-stabilizing interaction, and in the crystal structure of the inactive assembly, the active site lid is disordered.

== Allosteric regulators ==
As a nearly universal enzyme with a highly conserved active site, PBGS would not be a prime target for the development of antimicrobials and/or herbicides. To the contrary, allosteric sites can be much more phylogenetically variable than active sites, thus presenting more drug development opportunities.

Phylogenetic variation in PBGS allostery leads to the framing of discussion of PBGS allosteric regulation in terms of intrinsic and extrinsic factors.

=== Intrinsic allosteric regulators ===
==== Magnesium ====
The allosteric magnesium ion lies at the highly hydrated interface of two pro-octamer dimers. It appears to be easily dissociable, and it has been shown that hexamers accumulate when magnesium is removed in vitro.

==== pH ====
Though it is not common to consider hydronium ions as allosteric regulators, in the case of PBGS, side chain protonation at locations other than the active site has been shown to affect the quaternary structure equilibrium, and thus to affect the rate of its catalyzed reaction as well.

=== Extrinsic allosteric regulators ===
==== Small molecule hexamer stabilization ====
Inspection of the PBGS 6mer* reveals a surface cavity that is not present in the 8mer. Small molecule binding to this phylogenetically variable cavity has been proposed to stabilize 6mer* of the targeted PBGS and consequently inhibit activity.

Such allosteric regulators are known as morphlocks because they lock PBGS in a specific morpheein form (6mer*).

=== Lead poisoning ===
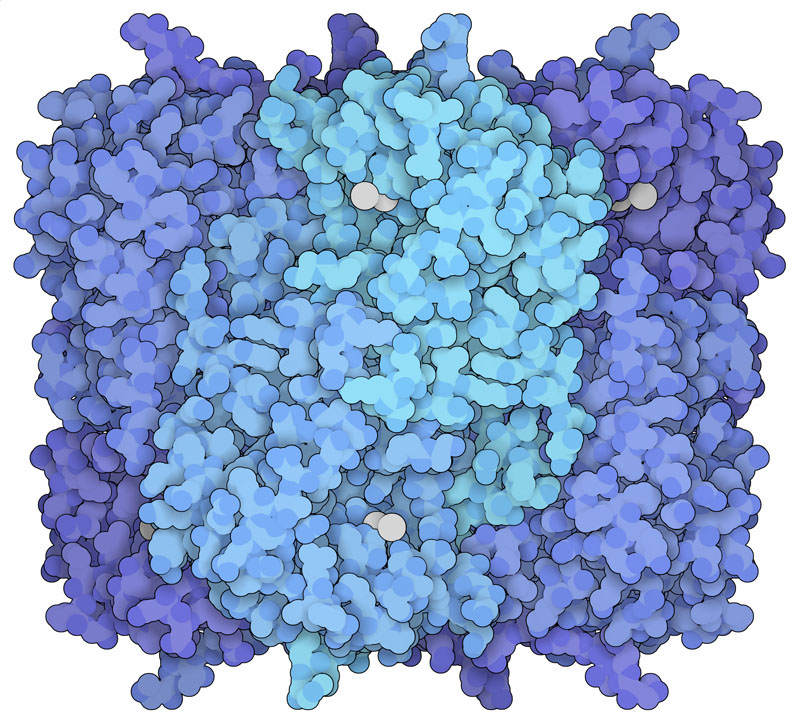
ALAD poisoned by gray lead ions

ALAD enzymatic activity is inhibited by lead, beginning at blood lead levels that were once considered to be safe (<10 μg/dL) and continuing to correlate negatively across the range from 5 to 95 μg/dL. Inhibition of ALAD by lead leads to anemia primarily because it both inhibits heme synthesis and shortens the lifespan of circulating red blood cells, but also by stimulating the excessive production of the hormone erythropoietin, leading to inadequate maturation of red cells from their progenitors. A defect in the ALAD structural gene can cause increased sensitivity to lead poisoning and acute hepatic porphyria. Alternatively spliced transcript variants encoding different isoforms have been identified.

== Deficiency ==
A deficiency of porphobilinogen synthase is usually acquired (rather than hereditary) and can be caused by heavy metal poisoning, especially lead poisoning, as the enzyme is very susceptible to inhibition by heavy metals.

Hereditary insufficiency of porphobilinogen synthase is called porphobilinogen synthase (or ALA dehydratase) deficiency porphyria. It is an extremely rare cause of porphyria, with less than 10 cases ever reported. All disease associated protein variants favor hexamer formation relative to the wild type human enzyme.

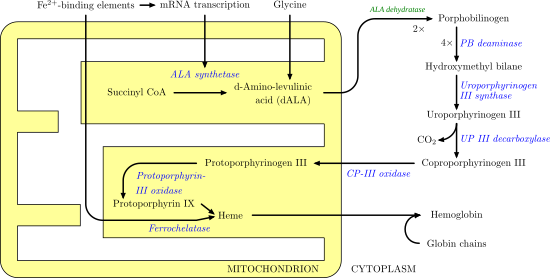
Heme synthesis—note that some reactions occur in the cytoplasm and some in the mitochondrion (yellow)

== PBGS as the prototype morpheein ==
The morpheein model of allostery exemplified by PBGS adds an additional layer of understanding to potential mechanisms for regulation of protein function and complements the increased focus that the protein science community is placing on protein structure dynamics.

This model illustrates how the dynamics of phenomena such as alternate protein conformations, alternate oligomeric states, and transient protein-protein interactions can be harnessed for allosteric regulation of catalytic activity.
