= Haematin =

Chemical compound

Identifiers
CAS Number	15489-90-4
3D model (JSmol)	Interactive image
ChemSpider	16736140
DrugBank	DB13387
ECHA InfoCard	100.035.911
EC Number	239-518-9
PubChem CID	446067
UNII	0WP180G15G
- InChI: InChI=1S/C34H48N4O4.Fe.H2O/c1-7-21-17(3)25-13-26-19(5)23(9-11-33(39)40)31(37-26)16-32-24(10-12-34(41)42)20(6)28(38-32)15-30-22(8-2)18(4)27(36-30)14-29(21)35-25;;/h7-8,20,24-32,36-37H,1-2,9-16H2,3-6H3,(H,39,40)(H,41,42);;1H2/q-2;+3;/p-1; Key: DVJHGZPPXLPYLP-UHFFFAOYSA-M
- SMILES: CC1C2CC3NC(CC4C(=C(C([N-]4)CC5NC(CC(C1CCC(=O)O)[N-]2)C(=C5C)CCC(=O)O)C)C=C)C(=C3C=C)C.[OH-].[Fe+3]

Properties
Chemical formula	C_{34}H_{33}FeN_{4}O_{5}
Molar mass	633.506 g·mol^{−1}
Solubility in water	insoluble in water, but soluble in alkaline water
- Except where otherwise noted, data are given for materials in their standard state (at 25 °C [77 °F], 100 kPa). verify (what is ?) Infobox references

Haematin (also known as hematin, ferriheme, hematosin, hydroxyhemin, oxyheme, phenodin, or oxyhemochromogen) is a dark bluish or brownish pigment containing iron in the ferric state, obtained by the oxidation of haem.

Haematin inhibits the synthesis of porphyrin (by repressing ALAS1 synthesis), and stimulates the synthesis of globin. For this reason, it is used in the treatment of porphyrias.

It is a component of cytochromes and peroxidases. Haematin derived synthetically from hemin is used as a reagent.
