= Fat necrosis =

Localized necrosis of adipose tissue

- Other names: also known as Balser's necrosis
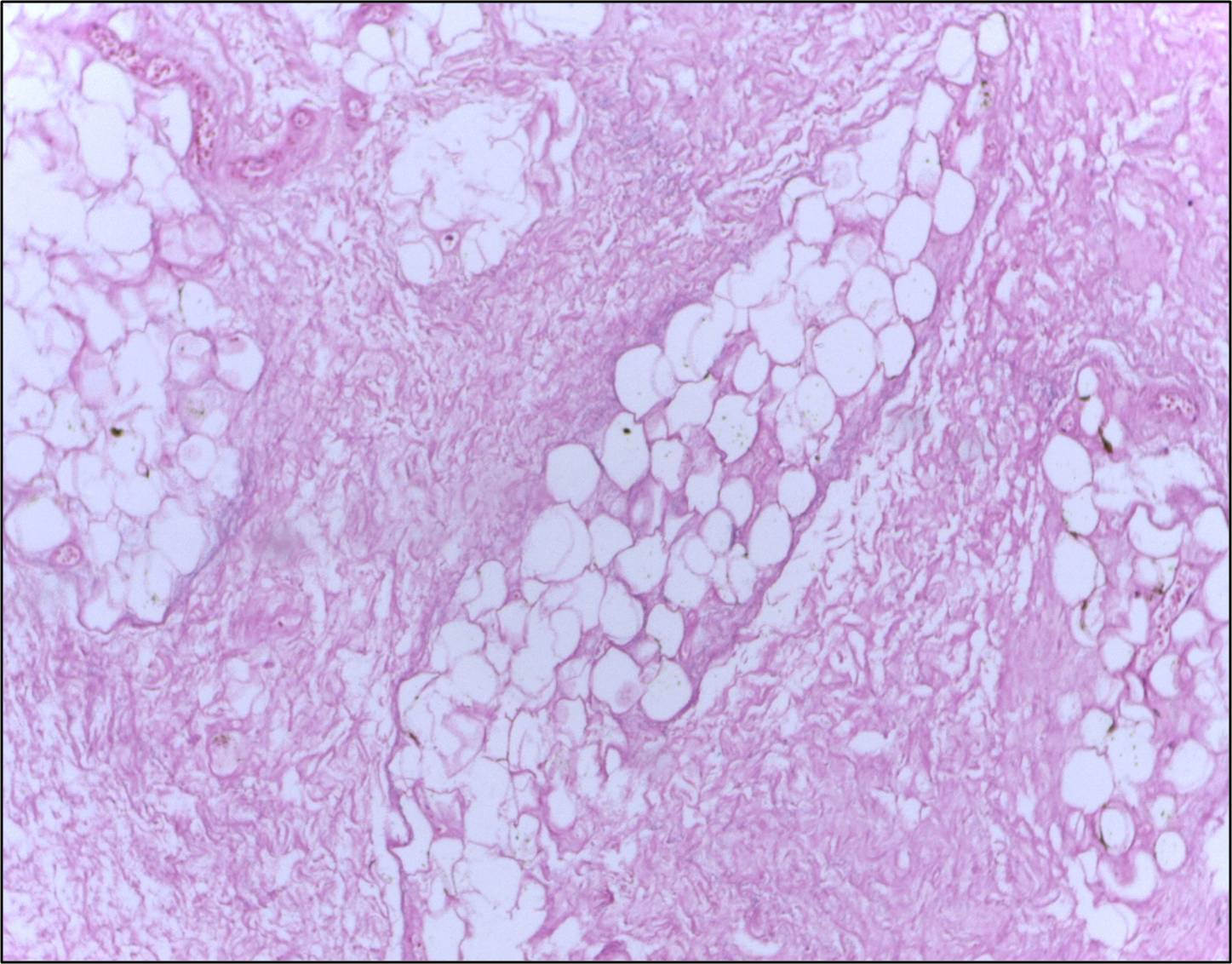
- Micrograph of breast tissue showing fat necrosis. H&E stain
- Specialty: Pathology

Fat necrosis is necrosis affecting fat tissue (adipose tissue). The term is well-established in medical terminology despite not denoting a specific pattern of necrosis. Fat necrosis may result from various injuries to adipose tissue, including: physical trauma, enzymatic digestion of adipocytes by lipases, radiation therapy, hypoxia, or inflammation of subcutaneous fat (panniculitis).

The gross appearance of fat necrosis is as an irregular, chalky white area within otherwise normal adipose tissue. Rarely, mobile encapsulated fat necrosis may instead appear as a mobile, firm, fibrous nodule deep to the skin.

== Pathophysiology ==
=== Trauma ===
Traumatic injury of adipose tissue liberates stored fat as well as lipases from adipocytes. The extracellular fat then elicits a swift inflammatory response, attracting macrophages and polymorphonuclear leukocytes which proceed to phagocytose the freed fat. The process eventually leads to fibrosis. The necrotic tissue may eventually form a palpable mass (especially if situated at a superficial site like the breast).

Traumatic fat necrosis commonly affects the breast and may resemble a tumour (especially in case of calcification of the necrotic mass).

=== Enzymatic digestion ===
Pancreatic conditions like acute pancreatitis, pancreatic carcinoma, and pancreatic trauma result in liberation of pancreatic lipase which proceeds to digest fat to form free fatty acids which subsequently combine with calcium to form soapy precipitates.

Although the peripancreatic region is the most commonly affected (due to direct contact with enzymes), associated fat necrosis may occur throughout the body in subcutaneous tissue, hand and foot joints, and bone marrow. These extrapancreatic complications are known as pancreatic panniculitis.

== Clinical significance ==
=== Breast fat necrosis ===
==== Causes ====
Examples of causes include but are not limited to:

- Breast trauma (e.g. seat belt injury from a car accident)
- Breast surgery
  - Fine needle aspiration biopsy and cytology (FNAB, FNAC)
  - Radiotherapy
  - Lumpectomy
  - Reduction mammoplasty
  - Breast reconstruction
- Pancreatic disease
  - Acute pancreatitis
  - Pancreatic cancer
  - Pancreatic injury
- Some forms of panniculitis
  - Subcutaneous fat necrosis of the newborn
  - Weber–Christian disease
- Polyarteritis nodosa

==== Epidemiology ====
Accidental trauma is the most common cause of breast fat necrosis, accounting for between 21-70% of case (often due to seat-belt injury). Symptomatic breast fat necrosis can also occur frequently after certain reconstructive surgeries, especially in free flap approaches, where it occurs after around 25% of surgeries. This is much greater than in pedicled flap approaches, where symptomatic necrosis happens in closer to 3% of cases. Breast fat necrosis is less common after breast cancer surgery, occurring in around 7% of cases. Rates following fat graft surgery range from 2-18%. Aside from known specific causes, middle aged women around with pendulous breasts, are at higher risk idiopathic (unknown cause) breast fat necrosis.

== See also ==
- Caseous necrosis
- Coagulative necrosis
- Liquefactive necrosis
- Myospherulosis
- Necrosis
