= Subcutaneous fat necrosis =

Subcutaneous fat necrosis may refer to:

- Pancreatic panniculitis
- Subcutaneous fat necrosis of the newborn
