= SFN =

SFN may refer to:

- Short filename, the 8.3 filename limitation of the DOS computer operating system
- SFN Group, Inc., a North American temporary work agency
- Single-frequency network, a broadcast network where several transmitters simultaneously send the same signal over the same frequency channel
- Small fiber neuropathy
- Society for Neuroscience, a professional society headquartered in Washington, D.C.
- Subcutaneous fat necrosis of the newborn, a medical condition occurring in newborns
- Protein stratifin
