= Myospherulosis =

Human disease

Myospherulosis, also known as spherulocytosis, is a foreign body-type granulomatous reaction to lipid-containing material and blood.

It may be seen in various settings including:

- Fat necrosis.
- Malignancy, e.g. renal cell carcinoma.
- Placement of topical tetracycline in a petrolatum base into a surgical site.

The resultant histopathologic pattern is most unusual and initially was mistakenly thought to represent a previously undescribed endosporulating fungus.

== See also ==
- Fat necrosis
