= Mobile encapsulated fat necrosis =

Benign medical condition of subcutaneous fat

Mobile encapsulated fat necrosis (MEFN) is a rare medical condition featuring the formation of a fibrotic capsule around a small, necrotic mass of fatty tissue. It is asymptomatic and benign but may be mistaken for other neoplasms due to its typical presentation as a firm nodule beneath the skin that can be moved around within the tissue. MEFN lesions frequently arise near joints on the arms and legs following trauma, especially the elbow. Many cases also appear even without any known injury.

MEFN lesions tend to go unnoticed for many years, due to their asymptomatic nature and relatively small size, usually being somewhat flattened and no more than 1–2 cm in diameter. Once noticed, they are often surgically removed, even in cases where this exceedingly rare condition is successfully identified by a physician familiar with it, because this procedure is minimally invasive and ensures that the MEFN lesion is not a more dangerous tumor.

== Histology ==
Nodules of mobile encapsulated fat necrosis are histologically characterized by regions of necrotic adipose tissue, with diffuse infiltration by foamy histiocytes, that are surrounded by fibrous septa. In some cases, the lesion may be granulomatous. Longstanding MEFN lesions are known to eventually calcify or even ossify.

== See also ==
- Fat necrosis
