= Erythema induratum =

Inflammation of the fatty layer under the skin of the calves

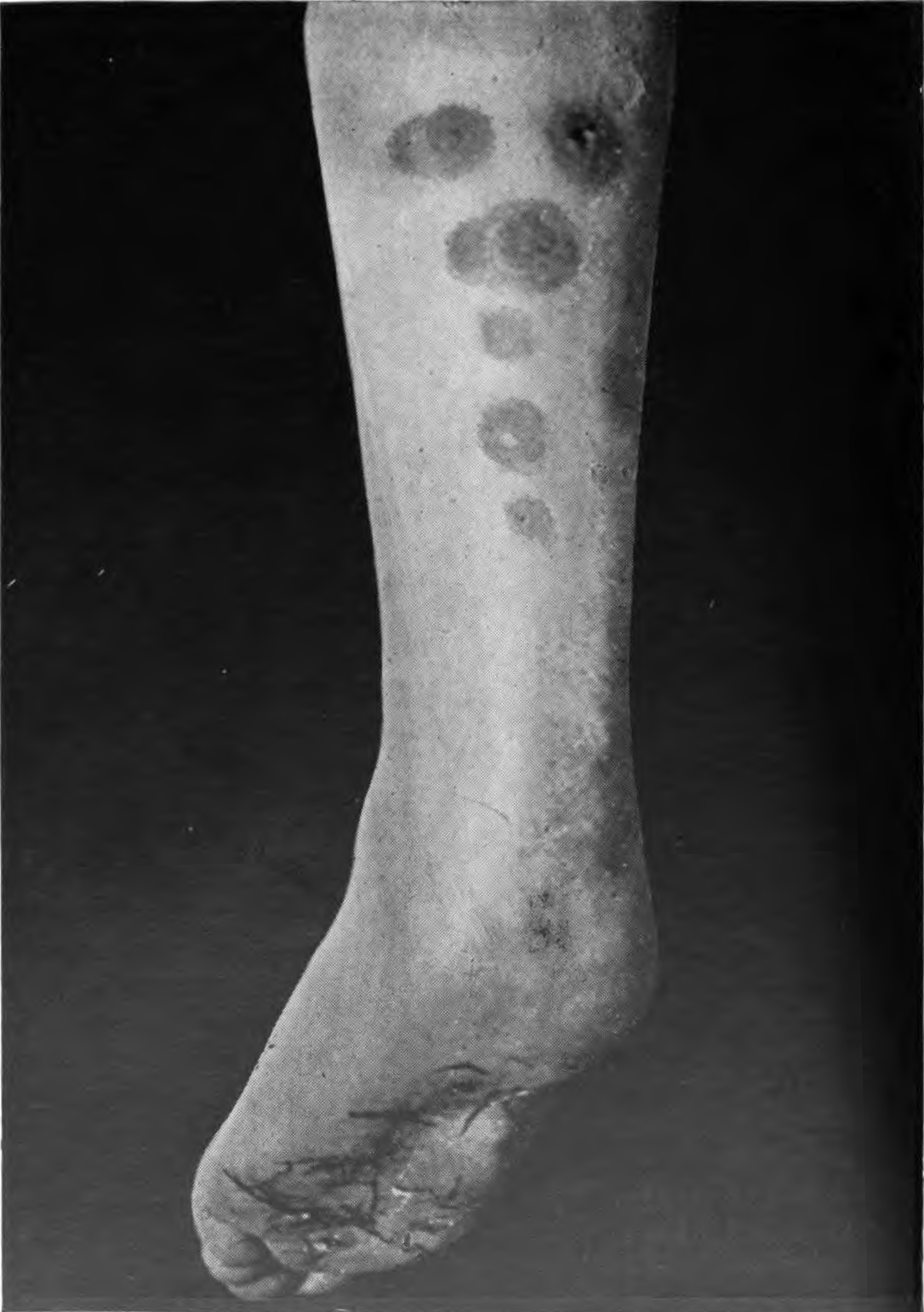
- Erythema induratum
- Specialty: Infectious diseases

Erythema induratum is a panniculitis on the calves. It occurs mainly in women, but it is very rare now. Historically, when it has occurred, it has often been concomitant with cutaneous tuberculosis, and it was formerly thought to be always a reaction to the TB bacteria. It is now considered a panniculitis that is not associated with just a single defined pathogen. The medical eponym Bazin disease was historically synonymous, but it applies only to the tuberculous form and is dated.

== Pathophysiology ==
Predisposing factors include abnormal amount of subcutaneous fat, thick ankles and abnormally poor arterial supply. Abnormal arterial supply causes low-grade ischemia of ankle region. The ankle skin becomes sensitive to temperature changes. When weather is cold, ankle is cold, blue and often tender. In hot weather, ankle becomes hot, edematous, swollen and painful. Chilblains may be present. On palpation, small superficial and painful nodules are felt. They break down to form small and multiple ulcers. Fresh crops of nodules appear in periphery of ulcer and ultimately break down. In nodular stage, pain is present; while it subsides in ulcerative stage.

== Diagnosis ==
Mainly clinical.

== Eponym ==
The name Bazin disease honors Pierre-Antoine-Ernest Bazin.

== Additional images ==
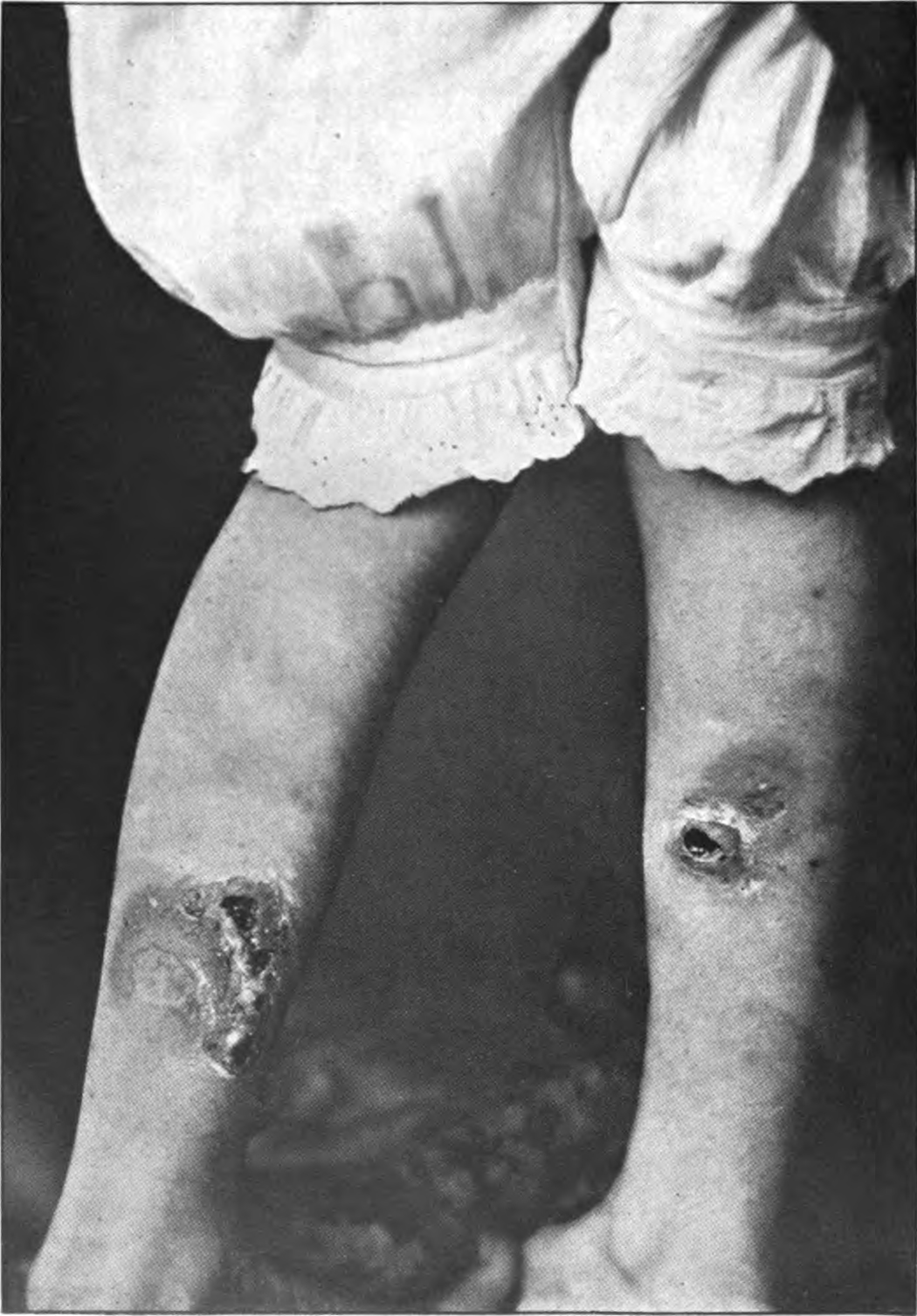
