= John Orchard (doctor) =

Australian sport and exercise medicine physician (born 1967)

John Orchard AM
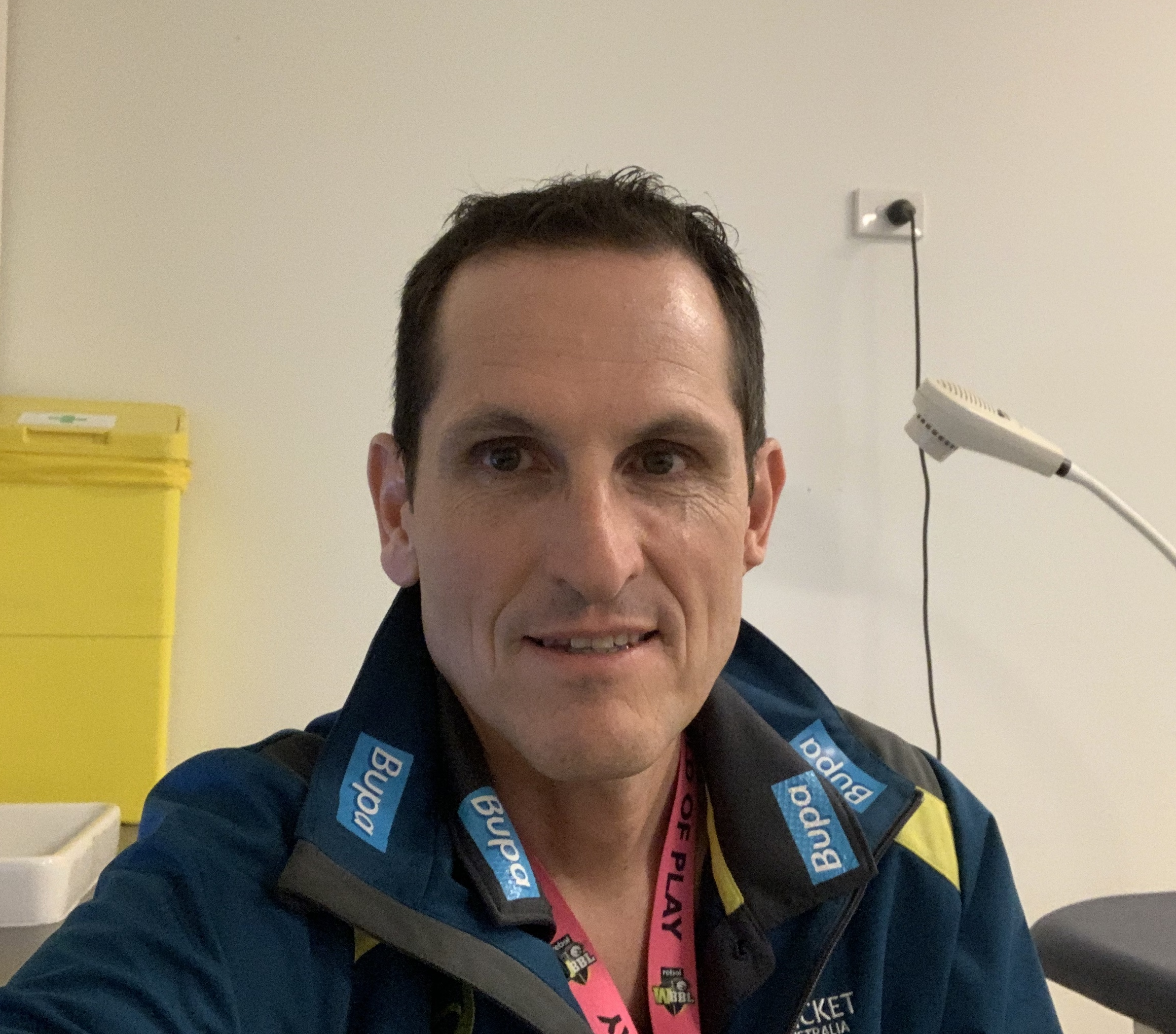
- Born: John William Orchard; 1967 (age 58–59); Australia
- Education: University of Melbourne; University of New South Wales
- Medical career
- Profession: Sports and exercise physician
- Website: johnorchard.com

John Orchard (born 1967) is an Australian sport and exercise medicine physician, notable for advocating for rule changes in sport to improve player safety. In 2020, he was awarded a Member of the Order of the Order of Australia for significant service to sports medicine, particularly cricket. He was a member of the Australian government advisory group for sport responding to COVID, representing professional sport as the Chief Medical Officer for Cricket Australia and was instrumental in cricket's response to COVID. He worked as the General Medical Officer for Australia at the 2023 FIFA Women's World Cup. Prior to his medical career, he worked in sports journalism at The Age including writing a computer program for football tipping and computer programming.

== Professional sporting teams ==
He has worked as doctor for the Sydney Swans, Sydney Roosters, NSW State of Origin rugby league team, Sydney Sixers, Cricket NSW and the Australian cricket team.

An incident which led to some infamy was his on-field use of a staple gun to close a head laceration sustained by Michael De Vere during a rugby league State of Origin match .

He also was the doctor on the field who responded to Phillip Hughes when he was felled by a cricket ball during a match in 2014, an injury from which the player later died.

== Injury prevention advocacy ==
=== Australian Football League ===
He spent over 20 years as the injury surveillance coordinator for the AFL. During this time injury surveillance drove many rules changes in the league including the centre-circle line (which reduced the rate of knee posterior cruciate ligament injuries in ruckmen) and reductions in permitted interchange to prevent muscle strains.

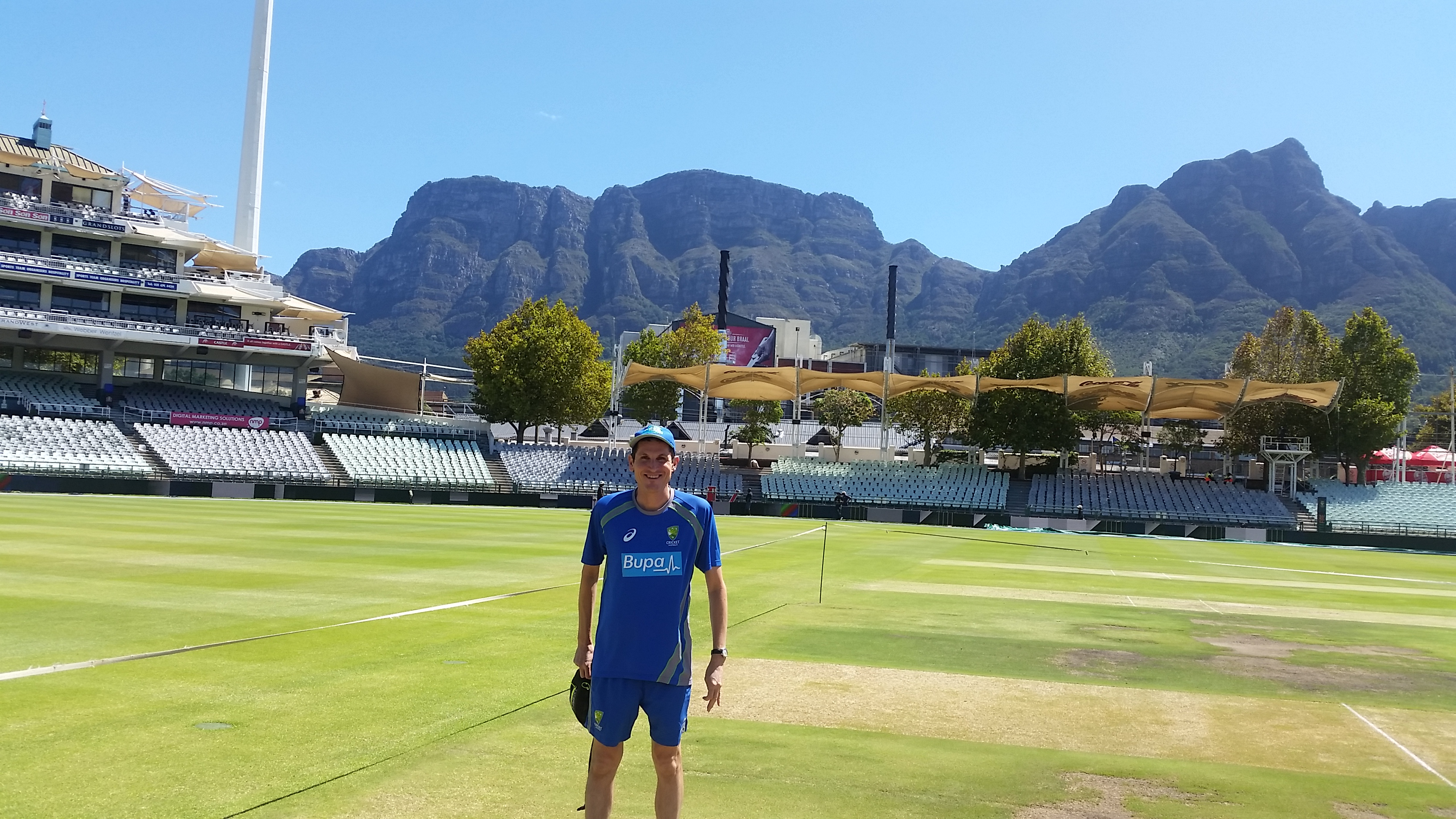
John Orchard (doctor)

=== National Rugby League ===
As Sydney Roosters doctor, he was outspoken on the need to ban the shoulder charge tackle in the NRL prior to this occurring.

=== Cricket ===
He campaigned for the introduction of substitutes in general and particularly for concussion in cricket and was the doctor at an Australian domestic game when this rule was first used in 2016. He was cited as having been a key driver of change when the International Cricket Council introduced Concussion substitutes in 2019, along with conducting research in general regarding concussion in cricket.

He also had a role in cricket making a boundary rope compulsory after reporting on injuries caused by fence collisions, and was involved in better management of stress fractures in fast bowlers during the 2010s. He assisted with treatment of Nic Maddinson when he was diagnosed with testicular cancer.

== Research ==
He is an academic (Adjunct Professor) at the University of Sydney and has published over 300 research papers with over 20000 citations, with high output of research into cricket injuries. He is a co-author on multiple International Olympic Committee consensus expert statements on preventing injuries in sport. He has campaigned for funding to better match evidence in the management of musculoskeletal injuries.

== Orchard Sports Injury and Illness Classification System (OSIICS) ==
John Orchard developed a sports injury classification system in 1993 called OSICS. It has been used by multiple sports in Australia, Europe and the USA. In 2020, it was expanded to include further illness codes, and adopted as one of two recommended systems by the International Olympic Committee.
