= Weber–Christian disease =

- Other names: Relapsing febrile nodular nonsuppurative panniculitis
- Specialty: Rheumatology

Weber–Christian disease is a cutaneous condition characterized by recurrent subcutaneous nodules that heal with depression of the overlying skin.

It is a type of panniculitis. It is a rare disease seen in females 30–60 years of age. It is a recurring inflammation of fatty layers of tissue present beneath the skin. Clinical course is characterised by exacerbations and remissions. Lesions are bilaterally symmetrical and are usually seen in the lower legs.

== Eponym ==
It is named after Frederick Parkes Weber and Henry Asbury Christian.

== See also ==
- Alpha-1 antitrypsin deficiency panniculitis
- List of cutaneous conditions
