= Smoke inhalation =

Breathing in of harmful fumes produced by combustion

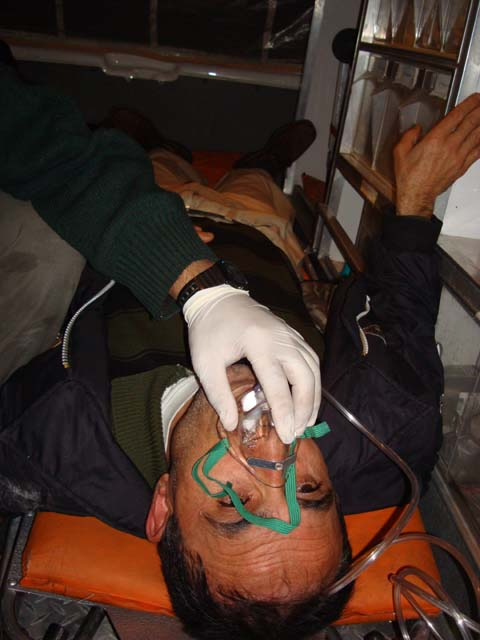
- A patient being treated for smoke inhalation in an ambulance by the Palestine Red Crescent Society in Jabaliya during the First Gaza War
- Specialty: Emergency medicine, pulmonology, critical care

Smoke inhalation is the breathing in of harmful fumes (produced as by-products of combusting substances) through the respiratory tract. This can cause smoke inhalation injury (a kind of acute inhalation injury) which is damage to the respiratory tract caused by chemical or heat exposure, as well as possible systemic toxicity after smoke inhalation. Smoke inhalation can occur from fires of various sources such as residential, vehicle, and wildfires. Morbidity and mortality rates in fire victims with burns are increased in those with smoke inhalation injury.

Victims of smoke inhalation injury can present with cough, difficulty breathing, low oxygen saturation, smoke debris or burns on the face. Smoke inhalation injury can affect the upper respiratory tract (above the larynx), usually due to heat exposure, or the lower respiratory tract (below the larynx), usually due to exposure to toxic fumes.

Initial treatment includes taking the victim away from the fire and smoke, giving 100% oxygen at a high flow through a face mask (non-rebreather if available), and checking the victim for injuries to the body. Treatment for smoke inhalation injury is largely supportive, with varying degrees of consensus on benefits of specific treatments.

== Epidemiology ==
The U.S. Fire Administration reported almost 1.3 million fires in 2019 causing 3,704 deaths and almost 17,000 injuries. Residential fires were found to be most often cooking related and resulted in the highest number of deaths when compared to other fire types such as vehicle and outdoor fires.

It has been found that men have higher rates of fire-related death and injury than women do, and that African American and American Indian men have higher rates of fire-related death and injury than other ethnic and racial groups. The age group with the highest rate of death from smoke inhalation is people over 85, while the age group with the highest injury rate is people of ages 50–54. Some reports also show increased rates of death and injury in children, due to their lower physical and mental capabilities.

In 2019, the overall U.S. national fire death rate was 10.7 people per million population and the injury rate was 50.6 people per million population. According to the U.S. Fire Administration, the deaths in the United States that were caused by a fire fluctuated over the past 10 years. The administration recorded the increase of deaths between 2012 and 2021, and concluded an increase of 18% per million. Smoke inhalation injury is the most common cause of death in fire victims. Fire victims with both burns to their body and smoke inhalation injury have increased mortality rate and length of hospital stay compared to those with burns alone.

== Signs and symptoms ==
After recent fire exposure, some of the signs and symptoms of smoke inhalation injury include cough, wheezing, stridor, confusion, difficulty breathing, low oxygen saturation, smoke debris (especially on the face or in saliva), burns (especially on the face), singed facial or nose hairs, or hoarse voice. A careful history can be helpful in determining where the fire occurred and what chemical fumes could have been inhaled as a result to determine what systemic toxicities may be present.

Smoke inhalation injury can lead to minor or major respiratory complications. Acute respiratory distress syndrome (ARDS) is a relatively delayed complication of smoke inhalation injury caused by chemical fumes inducing an inflammatory response in lung tissue, especially the small air sacs in the lungs where critical gas exchange occurs. Another potential complication is swelling of the upper airway from heat and chemical damage, which can become profound enough to obstruct breathing. The onset of airway swelling can be relatively delayed, making it difficult to intubate later on. Endotracheal intubation is considered early in certain situations for this reason. Other possible complications include pneumonia, vocal cord dysfunction and damage, and tracheal stenosis (usually delayed).

== Mechanism ==
Inhalation of chemical toxins produced by combusting materials can cause damage to tissues of both the upper (above the larynx) and lower respiratory tract (below the larynx). Damage to the lower airways, air sacs, and lung tissue is due to an inflammatory cascade in response to the noxious chemicals which causes a variety of downstream effects such as increased secretions and exudative material that clogs the airways or air sacs, collapse of air sacs, vascular permeability that leads to fluid in the lungs, bronchoconstriction, activation of the coagulation cascade, and impaired function of the mucociliary escalator.

Inhalation of hot fumes can cause thermal damage to tissue, usually limited to the upper respiratory tract (above the larynx). Damage in this location can result in sloughing of the damaged tissue and swelling, both of which can cause obstruction of the respiratory tract, ulceration, increased secretions, and redness.

Systemic toxicity can occur from inhalation of chemical compounds produced as byproducts of combustion in a fire. Carbon monoxide poisoning is the most common systemic toxicity after smoke inhalation, and can cause organ failure from lack of oxygen (often heart attack). Carbon monoxide is a common byproduct of combusting substances in fires and is colorless and odorless. It has a much higher binding affinity for hemoglobin compared to oxygen and can block oxygen from binding to hemoglobin. Additionally, carbon monoxide also decreases the ability of oxygen to dissociate from hemoglobin to diffuse into tissue. Both of these lead to hypoxia.

According to a New York Times article from 2022, while smoke inhalation has not been proven to cause lung cancer, unlike cigarette smoke (including secondhand smoke), studies published around that time found a correlation between the two. A panel of experts from Stanford University compared the inhalation of wildfire smoke to smoking cigarettes, stating, "exposure to high levels of pollution from wildfire smoke is the equivalent of smoking seven cigarettes a day." Dr. Nadeau, one of the panel's experts, later stated that, "cigarettes at least have filters."

The article also mentioned a study published in 2019 which found that firefighters who worked an average of 7 weeks per year for 5 to 25 years increased their risk of lung cancer by 8 to 26 percent due to smoke inhalation.

== Treatment ==
First responders often take the victim away from the fire and smoke, give 100% oxygen at high flow through a face mask (non-rebreather if available), assess level of consciousness, and check the victim for burns and/or injuries to the body for initial care. Upper respiratory tract injury due to heat exposure often results in swelling. Intubation should be considered early given that the swelling can have a slow, delayed onset but will make intubation very difficult once present.

Lower respiratory tract injury due to exposure to noxious fumes often consists of supportive measures such as intubation and ventilator support if indicated, suctioning of the airways, and other supportive measures. Intravenous fluids are a mainstay in treatment of fire victims with extensive burns to the body, however, there are differing perspectives on the risks and benefits of IV fluids in fire victims with both burns and smoke inhalation injury due to the potential worsening of pulmonary edema with large amounts of IV fluids typically given in burn victims.

Other treatments with differing perspectives and study findings on utility in smoke inhalation injury include nebulized bronchodilators (such as beta-2-agonists), IV corticosteroids, nebulized corticosteroids, nebulized epinephrine, nebulized heparin, and nebulized N-acetylcysteine.

Carbon monoxide poisoning is initially treated with high flow 100% oxygen. Hyperbaric oxygen therapy can be considered, but there are differing views on its clinical benefit in terms of outcomes.

== Systemic poisonings ==
Products with systemic effects are mainly asphyxiating gases, such as carbon monoxide and cyanides.

=== Carbon monoxide ===
Carbon monoxide (СО), which is absorbed by the lungs, diffuses into the capillaries and dissolves in the plasma and erythrocytes, binding to hemoglobin. As its affinity is more than 200 times that of oxygen, the amount of oxygen bound to hemoglobin is reduced, leading to anoxia. In addition, carbon monoxide released at the tissue level binds to mitochondrial enzyme systems, resulting in the inability of cells to utilize oxygen. When exposed to excess CO, one of the body's natural reactions is to breathe faster. This further increases the CO level in the blood, eventually leading to cardiac arrest.

=== Cyanides ===
Once the cyanide ion (CN-) enters the bloodstream, it diffuses into body cells. It binds to the trivalent iron of mitochondrial cytochrome oxidase, causing its inhibition and hence tissue anoxia. The metabolism shifts towards anaerobic metabolism, leading to an increase in lactacidemia.

== See also ==
- Acute inhalation injury
- Effects of cannabis
- Health effects of smoking tobacco
- Smoke abatement
