= Acute inhalation injury =

Acute inhalation injury may result from frequent and widespread use of household cleaning agents and industrial gases (including chlorine and ammonia). The airways and lungs receive continuous first-pass exposure to non-toxic and irritant or toxic gases via inhalation. Irritant gases are those that, on inhalation, dissolve in the water of the respiratory tract mucosa and provoke an inflammatory response, usually from the release of acidic or alkaline radicals. Smoke, chlorine, phosgene, sulfur dioxide, hydrogen chloride, hydrogen sulfide, nitrogen dioxide, ozone, and ammonia are common irritants.

Depending on the type and amount of irritant gas inhaled, victims can experience symptoms ranging from minor respiratory discomfort to acute airway and lung injury and even death. A common response cascade to a variety of irritant gases includes inflammation, edema and epithelial sloughing, which if left untreated can result in scar formation and pulmonary and airway remodeling. Currently, mechanical ventilation remains the therapeutic mainstay for pulmonary dysfunction following acute inhalation injury.

== Causes ==
=== Smoke inhalation ===
Smoke inhalation injury, either by itself but more so in the presence of body surface burn, can result in severe lung-induced morbidity and mortality. The most common cause of death in burn centers is now respiratory failure. The September 11 attacks in 2001 and forest fires in U.S. states such as California and Nevada are examples of incidents that have caused smoke inhalation injury. Injury to the lungs and airways is not only due to deposition of fine particulate soot but also due to the gaseous components of smoke, which include phosgene, carbon monoxide, and sulfur dioxide.

=== Chlorine ===
Chlorine is a relatively common gas in industry with a variety of uses. It is used to disinfect water as well as being a part of the sanitation process for sewage and industrial waste. Chlorine is also used as a bleaching agent during the production of paper and cloth. Many household cleaning products, including bleach, contain chlorine. Given the volume and ease of chlorine for industrial and commercial use, exposure could occur from an accidental spill or a deliberate attack. The National Institute for Occupational Safety and Health recommends that a person wear splash proof goggles, a face shield and a respirator mask when working in the vicinity of chlorine gas. Because chlorine is a gas at room temperature, most exposure occurs via inhalation. Exposure may also occur through skin or eye contact or by ingesting chlorine-contaminated food or water. Chlorine is a strong oxidizing element causing the hydrogen to split from water in moist tissue, resulting in nascent oxygen and hydrogen chloride that cause corrosive tissue damage. Additionally oxidation of chlorine may form hypochlorous acid, which can penetrate cells and react with cytoplasmic proteins destroying cell structure. Chlorine's odor provides early warning signs of exposure but causes olfactory fatigue or adaptations, reducing awareness of exposure at low concentrations. With increased exposure, symptoms may progress to labored respirations, severe coughing, chest tightness, wheezing, dyspnea, and bronchospasm associated with a decrease in oxygen saturation level. . Severe exposure may result in changes in upper and lower airways resulting in an acute lung injury, which may not be present until several hours after exposure. Chlorine gas has been used as a weapon of warfare since World War I, most recently in 2007 in Iraq.

=== Phosgene ===
Phosgene, notably used as a chemical weapon during World War I, is also used as an industrial reagent and building block in synthesis of pharmaceuticals and other organic compounds. Because of safety issues, phosgene is almost always produced and consumed within the same plant and extraordinary measures are made to contain this gas. In low concentrations, phosgene's odor resembles freshly cut hay or grass. Because of this, the gas may not be noticed and symptoms may appear slowly. Phosgene directly reacts with amine, sulfhydryl, and alcohol groups, adversely affecting cell macromolecules and metabolism. The direct toxicity to the cells leads to an increase in capillary permeability. Furthermore, when phosgene hydrolyzes it forms hydrochloric acid, which can damage the cell surface and cause cell death in the alveoli and bronchioles. The hydrochloric acid triggers an inflammatory response that attracts neutrophils to the lungs, which causes pulmonary edema.

=== Ammonia ===
Ammonia is generally used in household cleaning products, as well as on farms and in some industrial and commercial locations, and this makes it easy for accidental or deliberate exposure to occur. Ammonia interacts with moist surfaces to form ammonium hydroxide, which causes necrosis of tissues. Exposure to high concentrations can cause bronchiolar and alveolar edema and airway destruction resulting in respiratory distress or failure. Although ammonia has a pungent odor, it also causes olfactory fatigue or adaptation, reducing awareness of prolonged exposure.

=== Mustard gas ===
Sulfur mustard, commonly known as mustard gas, was used as a chemical weapon in World War I and more recently in the Iran–Iraq War. Sulfur mustard is a vesicant alkylating agent with strong cytotoxic, mutagenic, and carcinogenic properties. After exposure, victims show skin irritations and blisters. This agent also causes respiratory tract lesions, bone marrow depression, and eye damage, the epithelial tissues of these organs being predominately affected. Inhalation of high doses of this gas causes lesions in the larynx, trachea, and large bronchi with inflammatory reactions and necrosis. The alkylating agent affects more the upper parts of the respiratory tract, and only intensely exposed victims showed signs like bronchiolitis obliterans in the distal part. Secondary effects of sulfur mustard exposure lead to chronic lung diseases such as chronic bronchitis.

=== Chloramine ===
A common exposure involves accidental mixing of household ammonia with cleansers containing bleach, causing the irritant gas monochloramine to be released.

=== Methyl isocyanate ===
Methyl isocyanate is an intermediate chemical in the production of carbamate pesticides (such as carbaryl, carbofuran, methomyl, and aldicarb). It has also been used in the production of rubbers and adhesives. As a highly toxic and irritating material, it is hazardous to human health, and was involved in the Bhopal disaster—which killed nearly 8,000 people initially and approximately 17,000 people in total. When inhaled the vapor produces a direct inflammatory effect on the respiratory tract.

== Pathophysiology ==
Respiratory damage is related to the concentration of the gas and its solubility. Irritant gas exposures predominantly affect the airways, causing tracheitis, bronchitis, and bronchiolitis. Other inhaled agents may be directly toxic (e.g. cyanide, carbon monoxide), or cause harm simply by displacing oxygen and producing asphyxia (e.g. methane, carbon dioxide). The effect of inhaling irritant gases depends on the extent and duration of exposure and on the specific agent Chlorine, phosgene, sulfur dioxide, hydrogen chloride, hydrogen sulfide, nitrogen dioxide, ozone, and ammonia are among the most important irritant gases. Hydrogen sulfide is also a potent cellular toxin, blocking the cytochrome system and inhibiting cellular respiration. More water-soluble gases (e.g. chlorine, ammonia, sulfur dioxide, hydrogen chloride) dissolve in the upper airway and immediately cause mucous membrane irritation, which may alert people to the need to escape the exposure. Permanent damage to the upper respiratory tract, distal airways, and lung parenchyma occurs only if escape from the gas source is impeded. Less soluble gases (e.g. nitrogen dioxide, phosgene, ozone) may not dissolve until they are well into the respiratory tract, often reaching the lower airways. These agents are less likely to produce early warning signs (phosgene in low concentrations has a pleasant odor), are more likely to cause severe bronchiolitis, and often have a lag of ≥ 12 h before symptoms of pulmonary edema develop.

=== Acute lung injury ===
Acute lung injury (ALI), also called non-cardiogenic pulmonary edema, is characterized by the abrupt onset of significant hypoxemia and diffuse pulmonary infiltrates in the absence of cardiac failure. The core pathology is disruption of the capillary-endothelial interface: this actually refers to two separate barriers – the endothelium and the basement membrane of the alveolus. In the acute phase of ALI, there is increased permeability of this barrier and protein rich fluid leaks out of the capillaries. There are two types of alveolar epithelial cells – Type 1 pneumocytes represent 90% of the cell surface area, and are easily damaged. Type 2 pneumocytes are more resistant to damage, which is important as these cells produce surfactant, transport ions and proliferate and differentiate into Type 1 cells. The damage to the endothelium and the alveolar epithelium results in the creation of an open interface between the lung and the blood, facilitating the spread of micro-organisms from the lung systemically, stoking up a systemic inflammatory response. Moreover, the injury to epithelial cells handicaps the lung's ability to pump fluid out of airspaces. Fluid filled airspaces, loss of surfactant, microvascular thrombosis and disorganized repair (which leads to fibrosis) reduces resting lung volumes (decreased compliance), increasing ventilation-perfusion mismatch, right to left shunt and the work of breathing. In addition, lymphatic drainage of lung units appears to be curtailed—stunned by the acute injury—which contributes to the build-up of extravascular fluid. Some patients rapidly recover from ALI and have no permanent sequelae. Prolonged inflammation and destruction of pneumocytes leads to fibroblastic proliferation, hyaline membrane formation, tracheal remodeling and lung fibrosis. This fibrosing alveolitis may become apparent as early as five days after the initial injury. Subsequent recovery may be characterized by reduced physiologic reserve, and increased susceptibility to further lung injuries. Extensive microvascular thrombosis may lead to pulmonary hypertension, myocardial dysfunction and systemic hypotension.

=== Acute respiratory distress syndrome ===
Clinically, the most serious and immediate complication is acute respiratory distress syndrome (ARDS), which usually occurs within 24 hours. Those with significant lower airway involvement may develop bacterial infection. Importantly, victims suffering body surface burn and smoke inhalation are the most susceptible. Thermal injury combined with inhalation injury compromises pulmonary function, producing microvascular hyperpermeability that leads to a significant increase in lung lymph flow and pulmonary edema. The terrorist attack on the World Trade Center on September 11, 2001, left many people with impaired lung function. A study of firefighters and EMS workers enrolled in the FDNY WTC Medical Monitoring and Treatment Program, whose lung function was tested prior to 9/11, documented a steep decline in lung function in the first year after 9/11. A new study that includes a thousand additional workers shows that the declines have persisted over time. Prior to 9/11, 3% of firefighters had below-normal lung function, one year after 9/11 nearly 19% did, and six years later it stabilized at 13%. Ten to 14 days after acute exposure to some agents (e.g. ammonia, nitrogen oxides, sulfur dioxide, mercury), some patients develop bronchiolitis obliterans progressing to ARDS. Bronchiolitis obliterans with organized pneumonia can ensue when granulation tissue accumulates in the terminal airways and alveolar ducts during the body's reparative process. A minority of these patients develop late pulmonary fibrosis. Also at enhanced risk are persons with co-morbidities. Several studies report that both aged persons and smokers are especially vulnerable to the adverse effects of inhalation injury.

== Treatment strategies ==
Specific pretreatments, drugs to prevent chemically induced lung injuries due to respiratory airway toxins, are not available. Analgesic medications, oxygen, humidification, and ventilator support currently constitute standard therapy. In fact, mechanical ventilation remains the therapeutic mainstay for acute inhalation injury. The cornerstone of treatment is to keep the PaO2 > 60 mmHg (8.0 kPa), without causing injury to the lungs with excessive O2 or volutrauma. Pressure control ventilation is more versatile than volume control, although breaths should be volume limited, to prevent stretch injury to the alveoli. Positive end-expiratory pressure (PEEP) is used in mechanically ventilated patients with ARDS to improve oxygenation. Hemorrhaging, signifying substantial damage to the lining of the airways and lungs, can occur with exposure to highly corrosive chemicals and may require additional medical interventions. Corticosteroids are sometimes administered, and bronchodilators to treat bronchospasms. Drugs that reduce the inflammatory response, promote healing of tissues, and prevent the onset of pulmonary edema or secondary inflammation may be used following severe injury to prevent chronic scarring and airway narrowing.

Although current treatments can be administered in a controlled hospital setting, many hospitals are ill-suited for a situation involving mass casualties among civilians. Inexpensive positive-pressure devices that can be used easily in a mass casualty situation, and drugs to prevent inflammation and pulmonary edema are needed. Several drugs that have been approved by the FDA for other indications hold promise for treating chemically induced pulmonary edema. These include β2-agonists, dopamine, insulin, allopurinol, and non-steroidal anti-inflammatory drugs (NSAIDs), such as ibuprofen. Ibuprofen is particularly appealing because it has an established safety record and can be easily administered as an initial intervention. Inhaled and systemic forms of β2-agonists used in the treatment of asthma and other commonly used medications, such as insulin, dopamine, and allopurinol have also been effective in reducing pulmonary edema in animal models but require further study. A recent study documented in the AANA Journal discussed the use of volatile anesthetic agents, such as sevoflurane, to be used as a bronchodilator that lowered peak airway pressures and improved oxygenation. Other promising drugs in earlier stages of development act at various steps in the complex molecular pathways underlying pulmonary edema. Some of these potential drugs target the inflammatory response or the specific site(s) of injury. Others modulate the activity of ion channels that control fluid transport across lung membranes or target surfactant, a substance that lines the air sacs in the lungs and prevents them from collapsing. Mechanistic information based on toxicology, biochemistry, and physiology may be instrumental in determining new targets for therapy. Mechanistic studies may also aid in the development of new diagnostic approaches. Some chemicals generate metabolic byproducts that could be used for diagnosis, but detection of these byproducts may not be possible until many hours after initial exposure. Additional research must be directed at developing sensitive and specific tests to identify individuals quickly after they have been exposed to varying levels of chemicals toxic to the respiratory tract.

Currently there are no clinically approved agents that can reduce pulmonary and airway cell dropout and avert the transition to pulmonary and /or airway fibrosis.

== Preclinical development of pulmonary protective strategies ==
Given the constant threat of bioterrorist related events, there is an urgent need to develop pulmonary protective and reparative agents that can be used by first responders in a mass casualty setting. Use in such a setting would require administration via a convenient route for e.g. intramuscular via epipens. Other feasible routes of administration could be inhalation and perhaps to a lesser extent oral – swallowing can be difficult in many forms of injury especially if accompanied by secretions or if victim is nauseous. A number of in vitro and in vivo models lend themselves to preclinical evaluation of novel pulmonary therapies.

=== In vitro ===
In vitro, exposure of human bronchial epithelial cells or human pulmonary alveolar epithelial cells to agents such as hydrogen peroxide or bleach produces a time and toxin-dose-dependent decrease in cellular viability. Cells exposed to these agents demonstrate significant ATP depletion, DNA damage, and lipid peroxidation, followed by death allowing for evaluation of novel cytoprotective agents. Potential tissue reparative agents can be evaluated in vitro by determining their effects on stimulation of pulmonary and airway epithelial cell proliferation.

=== In vivo ===
Test articles passing muster in vitro can be evaluated in a number of in vivo models (usually in mice) of ALI including chlorine inhalation, intratracheal instillation of bleomycin and in transforming growth factor β1 (TGF β1) overexpressing transgenic mice exposed to high dose doxycycline. Acute exposure to high concentrations of chlorine gas induces pathological and functional changes in the lungs of rodents. Histological changes consist of epithelial necrosis and detachment, increase in the area of smooth muscle, epithelial regeneration and mucous cell hyperplasia. Most of these abnormalities resolve with time. Functional changes (increased RL and/or bronchial responsiveness to inhaled methacholine) last for mean intervals of 3 and 7 days after exposure, but can persist up to 30 and 90 days, respectively. The functional changes are related to the overall abnormal airway epithelial damage and there is a significant correlation between RL and bronchoalveolar lavage ( BAL) neutrophilia. Bleomycin is an antineoplastic antibiotic drug isolated in 1966 from the actinomycete Streptomyces verticillus. Bleomycin forms a complex with oxygen and metals such as Fe2+, leading to the production of oxygen radicals, DNA breaks, and ultimately cell death. Doxycycline driven overexpression of TGF β1 in the lungs of transgenic mice result in a time-dependent inflammatory response characterized by massive infiltration of F4/80+ monocytic/macrophage-like cells and a wave of apoptotic pulmonary cell death. Mice that survive this initial onslaught go on to demonstrate an increase in lung collagen content, and decreased lung compliance. In rodent models of smoke inhalation lung injury, targeted biologics have demonstrated potential in mitigating acute tissue damage. Recombinant human mitsugumin 53 (MG53) was shown to attenuate pulmonary inflammation and oxidative stress in a rat smoke inhalation model. A large animal model of ALI is the ovine model of body surface burn + heated smoke inhalation. It has been established that combined burn and smoke inhalation injury impairs hypoxic pulmonary vasoconstriction (HPV), the vasoconstrictive response to hypoxia, thereby mismatching ventilation with perfusion. Gas exchange is affected by increases in the dispersion of both alveolar ventilation and cardiac output because bronchial and vascular functions are altered by injury-related factors, such as the effects of inflammatory mediators on airway and vascular smooth muscle tone. As a rule of thumb, all these models are characterized by high mortality, inflammation of the airways and pulmonary parenchyma, edema and flooding of the alveolar spaces by a proteinaceous exudate, sloughing of the airway and pulmonary epithelium, scarring and transition to airway and pulmonary remodeling.
