= Pancreatic injury =

- Specialty: Emergency medicine

A pancreatic injury is some form of trauma sustained by the pancreas. The injury can be sustained through either blunt forces, such as a motor vehicle accident, or penetrative forces, such as that of a gunshot wound. The pancreas is one of the least commonly injured organs in abdominal trauma.

== Management ==
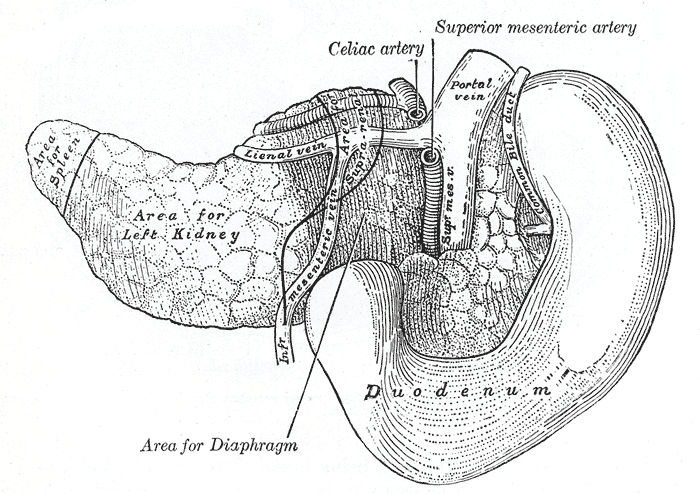
Diagram of the pancreas, showing its relation to the duodenum and the mesenteric veins and arteries

=== Diagnosis ===
The diagnosis of this form of injury can be challenging because of the pancreas' location inside the abdomen. The use of ultrasound can reveal fluid around the site of injury. Computed tomography (CT) can also be utilized as a non-invasive diagnostic tool, but its reliability is low; one retrospective case review found that computed tomography had either failed to find injuries or had underestimated the severity of injury in more than half of 17 pancreatic injury patients. Serum amylase has also been shown to be of limited diagnostic utility within the first three hours following injury.

Management of a pancreatic injury can be difficult because other abdominal organs, such as the liver, usually have sustained trauma as well. Several common symptoms manifest hours after the injury such as tachycardia, abdominal distension, and mid-epigastric tenderness. Indications for surgical intervention include: peritonitis based on physical examination; hypotension in combination with a positive focussed assessment with sonography (ultrasound) for trauma (FAST); and pancreatic duct disruption based on the results of thin-cut computed tomography or endoscopic retrograde cholangiopancreatography (ERCP). Commonly, a laparotomy is done in order to directly visualize the injury, and generally this approach is the most accurate diagnostic method.

=== Classification ===
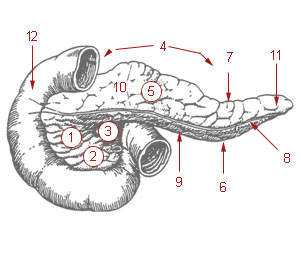
1: Head of pancreas 2: Uncinate process of pancreas 3: Pancreatic notch 4: Body of pancreas 5: Anterior surface of pancreas 6: Inferior surface of pancreas 7: Superior margin of pancreas 8: Anterior margin of pancreas 9: Inferior margin of pancreas 10: Omental tuber 11: Tail of pancreas 12: Duodenum

Pancreatic injuries are classified according to the criteria of the American Association for the Surgery of Trauma (AAST). The grade of the trauma should be increased by one level for multiple injuries to the same organ. The description of the injury is that "based on most accurate assessment at autopsy, laparotomy, or radiological study." The pancreatic organ injury scale, as minimally modified, is:

The Pancreatic Injury Scale classification
Grade	Subcapsular hematoma	Laceration
I	Minor contusion without ductal injury	Superficial laceration without ductal injury
II	Major contusion without duct injury or tissue loss	Major laceration without duct injury or tissue loss
III	Distal transection or parenchymal injury with duct injury	
IV	Proximal transection or parenchymal injury, involving ampulla	
V	Laceration-Massive disruption of pancreatic head	

=== Surgical treatment ===
When there is no pancreatic duct injury, typically hemostasis and surgical drainage are the main form of treatment. Surgical repair is undertaken when there is evidence or suspicion of ductal injury. The type of surgery depends on the degree of the injury and its proximity to the mesenteric blood vessels that serve the pancreas. When injuries are not close to the mesenteric vessels, a distal pancreatectomy may be done; this procedure preserves much of the pancreas and usually avoids loss of its endocrine and exocrine functions. In severe cases of pancreaticoduodenal injury, a pancreaticoduodenectomy can be used. Common complications after surgery include pancreatitis, pancreatic fistula, abscess, and pseudocyst formation. Initial management of hemorrhage includes controlling it by packing the wound.

== History ==
The first recorded case of pancreatic injury was published in The Lancet in 1827. At the time, death as a result of injury was deemed to be "universal". The first successful surgery to repair a transected pancreas was performed in 1904 by Garré, who reported the case the following year.
