= Subcutaneous fat necrosis of the newborn =

- Other names: SCFN or SFN
- Specialty: Pediatrics

Subcutaneous fat necrosis of the newborn is a rare form of lobular panniculitis occurring in newborns that is usually self-remitting and non-recurring. Proposed causes include perinatal stress, local trauma, hypoxia and hypothermia, though the exact cause is unknown. It has been suggested that the brown fat seen in newborns is more sensitive to hypoxic injury than fat seen in adults, and that such hypoxia, usually in the context of a complicated birth, leads to the fat necrosis. Complications can include hypercalcemia, hyperlipidemia, dehydration, hypoglycemia, seizures, vomiting, constipation, and thrombocytopenia, and can present months after the onset of SCFN symptoms.

== Signs and symptoms ==
Subcutaneous fat necrosis of the newborn (SCFN) occurs in full-term newborns usually in the first six weeks of life as indurated plaques or erythematous to violaceous nodules on the cheeks, back, buttocks, or proximal extremities. Usually, the abdomen and chest are unaffected. There has been a case report of SCFN with localized scalp alopecia covering an erythematous nodule. Tenderness is common in lesions.

About 50% of newborns with subcutaneous fat necrosis of the newborn (SCFN) experience hypercalcemia, a potentially fatal consequence. Some infants with SCFN experience anemia, hypoglycemia, thrombocytopenia, and elevated triglycerides. Rarely, thrombocytosis is seen in infants with SCFN.

== Causes ==
Although the exact cause of the newborn's subcutaneous fat necrosis is unknown, several systemic maternal diseases, including preeclampsia and diabetes, as well as asphyxia, hypothermia, meconium aspiration, and obstetric trauma, may act as precipitating factors in the development of SCFN.

== Diagnosis ==
A skin biopsy and the clinical presentation must both be taken into account for the most accurate diagnosis. But in order to prevent skin biopsy, ultrasonography examination has been shown to be useful in identifying the newborn's subcutaneous fat necrosis when combined with Doppler blood flow analysis; this usually indicates a subcutaneous high echo signal, either with or without calcifications.

== See also ==
- Pancreatic panniculitis
- Panniculitis
