= Primary cutaneous acral CD8 positive T cell lymphoproliferative disorder =

- Other names: Primary cutaneous acral CD8 positive T cell lymphoma, Indolent CD8+ lymphoid proliferation of the ear
- Specialty: Dermatology, Oncology
- Symptoms: Cutaneous nodule or plaque
- Usual onset: Adults usually 29 years of age or older
- Treatment: Surgery and/or radiotherapy or just observation
- Prognosis: Good to excellent
- Frequency: Rare

Primary cutaneous acral CD8 positive T cell lymphoproliferative disorder (CD8+ TLPD) is one type of the lymphoproliferative disorders, subclass cutaneous T-cell lymphoma, in which a slow-growing nodule or papule develops on the ear or, less commonly, other acral sites. CD8 positive T-cells (i.e., CD8+ T-cells) are a subtype of the lymphocytes and acral sites are peripheral parts of the body, i.e., the hands, arms, feet, legs, ears, nose, fingernails, and toenails. In 2007, Petrella et al.,7 reported four patients with tumors composed of CD8+ T-cells and termed the disorder indolent CD8+ lymphoid proliferation of the ear. In 2018, the World Health Organization and European Organisation for Research and Treatment of Cancer provisionally classified this disorder as a lymphoma and termed it primary cutaneous acral CD8 positive T cell lymphoma. (The "primary" used to designate cutaneous lymphomas indicates that the lymphoma was first diagnosed as limited to the skin and there was no evidence of spread to extracutaneous tissues for 6 months after the diagnosis was first made.) In 2022, however, the International Consensus Classification (ICC) group of experts in various medical fields maintained that this disorder was not malignant and therefore termed it primary cutaneous acral CD8 positive T cell lymphoproliferative disorder. In 2024, the World Health Organization (WHO) agreed with this classification and designation. However, histiocyte and CD8 T-cell-rich lymphoproliferations of the skin in individuals with primary immunodeficiency (i.e., individuals born with an immunodeficiency due to genetic causes), which had been regarded as a form of CD8+ TLPD, was reclassified as one of the inborn error of immunity-associated lymphoproliferative disorders by the WHO (2022) classification of hematolymphoid tumors. That is, it is now designated as a histiocyte and CD8 T-cell rich lymphoproliferative disorder in patients due to their having an inborn error of immunity. Here, these ICC and WHO classifications are followed, i.e., primary cutaneous acral CD8 positive T cell lymphoma is termed primary cutaneous acral CD8 positive T cell lymphoproliferative disorder and histiocyte and CD8-rich and T-cell-rich lymphoproliferations in associated with a congenital immunodeficiency are not considered to be a form of CD8+ TLPD.

The correct diagnosis of CD8+ TLPD is crucial because of its far more benign clinical behavior than many other types of similarly appearing CD8+ T-cell lymphomas.

== Presentation ==
At presentation, 31 patients with CD8+ TLPD were 29–89 years old (average 52.1 years); 23 were male, 8 were female; 26 had nodules, 5 had plaques; 28 had a single lesion, 2 had bilateral lesions, and 1 had multiple lesions; 18 had a single lesion on the ear, 3 had a single lesion on the nose, 1 had a single lesion on the leg, 4 had a single lesion on the foot, 2 had a single lesion on the arm, 1 had a single lesion on the hand, 1 had a single lesion on a non-acral site behind the ear, and 1 had disseminated lesions at non-acral sites on the head and neck. Among the 26 patients for which this data was available, their lesions had begun and slowly increased in size for 3 to 420 months (median duration 12 months) prior to their being diagnosed. Rarely, patients have also presented with CD8+ TLPD lesions on two other non-acral sites, the thigh or eyelid. TCD8+ TLPD lesions have presented as reddish/purple nodules or plaques measuring up to several centimeters in maximal dimension. These lesions are not ulcerated, i.e., do not have ulcers. Various analyses to define the patients stage, (i.e., extent of disease) at presentation using computed tomography scans and/or bone marrow examinations almost uniformly found that at presentation or thereafter the lesions had not spread to non-cutaneous sites. About 20% of patients that had their CD8+ TLPD lesions disappear in response to treatment will have purely cutaneous recurrences of their lesions. As of 2022, only one patient, after a long history of being repeatedly treated for cutaneous recurrences of CD8+ TLPD, developed a subcutaneous spread of a CD8+ TLPD nasal lesion into the nearby nasal bone and cartilage.

== Histopathology and immunochemistry ==
The microscopic histopathology (i.e., examination) of CD8+ TLPD lesions commonly shows a dense infiltration of similarly appearing, medium-sized (or in uncommon cases large or small) CD+ T-cells. In some cases, these T-cells have a monocyte-like appearance and nuclei that are eccentrically located and kidney-shaped. The lesions may also show small collections of B lymphocytes but have few plasma cells or eosinophils. The lesions show no evidence that their cells have invaded blood vessels. In three reported cases, there was an extension of the infiltrate into the nearby subcutaneous fat tissue. The growth rate of these T-cells, as measured by their tissues' proliferation index (a histopathological measurement of how many cells in the lesions are dividing into two daughter cell) or Ki-67 (a measure of the proliferation rate of the lesions individual cells) is usually low. The lesions do not have areas of necrosis, i.e., clumps of dead cells. Analyses of the lesions using immunochemistry methods indicate that their cells do not express cytosol protein perforin nor, in most cases, the granule-bound protein granzyme B. The T-cells in these lesions do express T-cell receptor proteins, CD8 (a transmembrane glycoprotein that is a co-receptor for the T-cell receptor), TIA-1 (i.e., a granule-bound mRNA-binding protein), and in almost all cases (e.g., 26 of 28 cases in one study), the CD68 glycoprotein which is distributed in an unusual and distinctive dot-like pattern around the cell's nucleus.

== Diagnosis ==
The diagnosis of CD8+ TLPD is strongly dependent on finding that: a) it presents as a very slowly growing and usually single nodule or plaque that consists of CD8+ T cells in the cutaneous tissues primarily but not exclusively of acral sites, particularly the ear, in adults; b) the cells in these lesions are predominantly CD8+ T-cells that typically have a low growth rate but otherwise have some features that resemble those found in malignant lymphomas; c) the lesions' T-cells cells express CD3, CD8, and TIA-1 but not perforin nor in most cases, granzyme B; d) most cases of CD8+ TLPD express CD68 in a characteristic perinuclear dot-like pattern which is rarely found in other cutaneous T cell lymphomas and therefore a good indicator of CD8+ TLPD; and e) its T cells usually express CD3, often do not express one or more of the CD2, CD5 and CD7 proteins, and do not express CD30, CD56, B3GAT1 (i.e., CD57), or terminal deoxynucleotidyl transferase (i.e., TdT). These features of CD8+ TLPD typically distinguish it from similarly appearing but aggressive CD8 T cell lymphomas such as primary cutaneous aggressive epidermotropic CD8+ cytotoxic T-cell lymphoma, the peripheral T-cell lymphoma not otherwise specified in the subtype of this lymphoma that consists of CD8+ T-cells, the CD8-expressing variants of mycosis fungoides which in about 4% of cases progress to more extensive disorders that are treated aggressively, subcutaneous panniculitis-like T-cell lymphoma, the subcutaneous form of anaplastic large cell lymphomas, and primary cutaneous small/medium-sized pleomorphic cutaneous T-cell lymphoma.

== Treatment and prognosis ==
Patients with CD8+ TLPD have been treated with surgical excision, radiation therapy, photodynamic therapy, PUVA ultraviolet light therapy, topical steroids, and anti-cancer drugs (e.g., bexarotene, pralatrexate, methotrexate, chlormethine, doxorubicin, gemcitabine, oxaliplatin, and the CHOP chemotherapy regimen). However, CD8+ TLPD is almost always a benign disorder that may relapse after treatment but rarely if ever disseminates to extracutaneous tissues. Indeed, CD8+ TLPD lesions have slowly disappeared after being biopsied but not further treated in about 10% of cases and in one study 71% of patients with CD8+ TLPD had complete disease remissions following their treatment. Because of its very indolent course, the use of aggressive therapies (e.g., anti-cancer drugs) to treat CD8+ TLPD is not recommended. Rather, studies have concluded that CD8+ TLPD lesions should be treated with local therapies (i.e., surgical removal and/or localized radiation) or even long-term observations without treatment. It has also been recommended that clinical staging (i.e., examinations to determine the extent of disease) is unnecessary in cases presenting with the typical clinical presentation and histology of CD8+ TLPD.
