= Lennert lymphoma =

- Other names: lymphoepithelioid variant of the peripheral T-cell lymphoma, unspecified
- Specialty: Oncology, hematology
- Usual onset: Middle-aged and older adults
- Treatment: Chemotherapy
- Prognosis: guarded
- Frequency: Rare

Lennert lymphoma, also termed lymphoepithelioid lymphoma, lymphoepithelioid variant of peripheral T-cell lymphoma, and epithelioid cellular lymphogranulomatosis, is a rare subtype of the T cell lymphomas. It was first characterized by Karl Lennert in 1952 as a variant of Hodgkin lymphoma based on the presence of cells resembling the Reed–Sternberg cells that typify Hodgkin lymphoma. However, later studies concluded that these cells are not Reed-Sternberg cells and that Lennert lymphoma is not a variant of Hodgkin lymphoma.

Lennert lymphoma is now regarded as one form of the peripheral T-cell lymphomas. The World Health Organization (2016) classified these peripheral T-cell lymphomas into more than 25 different subtypes such as the anaplastic large-cell lymphoma (including its ALK+ and ALK- subtypes), angioimmunoblastic T-cell lymphoma, and peripheral T-cell lymphoma not otherwise specified. Peripheral T-cell lymphomas not otherwise specified include Lennert Lymphoma as well as several other lymphoma subtypes. However, the criteria used for diagnosing Lennert lymphomas has varied between different studies. That is, Lennert lymphoma has been defined using different microscopic histologies and immunochemistries (i.e., proteins expressed by tumor cells). Descriptions of the clinical features, prognoses, and survival times for Lennert lymphomas have also varied across different reports. Here, Lennert lymphoma is reviewed based on studies that used criteria to define this lymphoma which future studies may find are indicative of another type of lymphoma. Studies that question the identity of the "Lennert lymphomas" diagnostic criteria and other features used in different studies are included in this review.

== Clinical presentation ==
While the great majority of patients with Lennert lymphoma present with swollen lymph nodes, they also present with other symptoms in addition to, or without, obvious lymph node enlargements. In a review study of 26 patients (i.e., 15 men and 11 women, median age 72 years, range from 44 to 90 years) diagnosed with Lennert lymphoma: a) 7 presented with B symptoms (i.e., fever, night sweats, and/or unintentional weight loss); b) 8 presented with (or later acquired) cancer cells in their bone marrow, blood, skin, liver, lung, bone, and/or subcutaneous tissue in addition to their lymph nodes; c) 6 presented with hepatosplenomegaly (i.e., enlargement of both the liver and spleen) in addition to their lymph nodes; d) 5 had a 2 or 3 score on the ECOG/WHO/Zubrod questionnaire (i.e., they stayed in bed some or most of the day) at presentation; and e) 16 had a 3 or 4 on the International Prognostic Index (i.e., they had a projected 5 year survival of 43% or less) at presentation. The extent of disease at presentation of Lennert lymphoma uses the same Ann Arbor staging system employed for all non-Hodgkin lymphomas: Stage I, involvement of a lymph node region or a single set of lymph nodes or a single tissue site in the lymphatic system; Stage II, involvement of multiple lymph node sites, other tissue in the lymphatic system, and/or non-lymphatic tissues all of which are on the same side of the thoracic diaphragm; Stage III, involvement of lymph nodes, other tissue in the lymphoid system, and/or non-lymphoid tissues with at least one of the sites being on the opposite side of the diaphragm from the other sites; Stage IV, disseminated disease occurring on both sides of the thoracic diaphragm and involving one or more non-lymphatic organs or all cases in which the liver and/or bone marrow is/are involved. Among the 26 patients in the review study, 2 had not been staged, 1 had Stage I, 5 had Stage II, 9 had Stage III, 8 had stage IV, and 1 had stage III or IV disease. A later study of 10 patients (9 males, 1 female; mean age of 48.7, range 22–67 years) reported that: 1 presented with B symptoms, 1 presented with bone marrow involvement, 2 presented with involvement of tissues outside of their lymph nodes, 3 had bulky disease, and 4 had a mediastinal tumor that was not further defined. A 2009 review reported on one patient and 11 previously reported patients with Lennert lymphomas that invaded their skin. These skin lesions were asymptomatic, non-ulcerated, and red to violet papules, nodules, or small plaques on the trunk and limbs. In a more recent report, one patient with Lennert lymphoma had symptomatic skin lesions: the skin patches itched, felt warm, were located on the back of the neck, back, and buttocks, and on microscopic examination were infiltrated with Lennert lymphoma cells. Another recent study reported that a 65 year old patient had a painless subcutaneous tissue Lennert lymphoma but no evidence that it had invaded the nearby bone or skin surface nor that it was present in his lymph nodes, It was suggested that this Lennert lymphoma originated in the subcutaneous soft tissue rather than lymphatic system.

=== Follicular helper T cell lymphoma ===
In the study of 26 patients with Lennert lymphoma, 15 had tumor cells that expressed one or more of the three proteins expressed by follicular helper T cells, viz. PD-1, CXCL13, and CD10. These patients had a more severe form of Lennert lymphoma as defined by there survival times: the percentage of patients surviving 52 months after the diagnosis in the 15 patients with tumor cells that had one or more of these marker proteins was 33%, i.e., 5 of 15 patients, while it was 73%, i.e., 8, of the 11 patients, that lacked tumor cells with one or more of these maker proteins. This difference was statistically significant (p-value of 0.011) based on the Logrank test and Kaplan–Meier estimator for the survival curves of the two patient groups. However, other studies suggest that "Lennert lymphomas" with features of follicular helper T cell-bearing lymphomas are best defined as follicular helper T-cell lymphomas or angioimmunoblastic T cell lymphomas rather than Lennert lymphomas.

=== Human T-cell lymphotropic virus type 1 ===
Globally, the number of individuals infected with the human T-cell lymphotropic virus type 1 is estimated to be 5–10 million. These individuals reside principally in this virus's endemic areas, i.e., Japan (mainly the islands of Kyushu and Shikoku), sub-Saharan Africa, South America, the Caribbean area, Iran, Romania, and Melanesia. This virus causes adult T-cell leukemia/lymphoma, tropical spastic paraparesis, and various inflammatory disorders such as uveitis and dermatitis. Clinically and histopathologically, T-cell leukemia/lymphoma may mimic and therefore be misdiagnosed as other types of T-cell neoplasms including Lennert lymphoma. One large study suggested that in diagnosing Lennert lymphomas tests should be conducted to determine the presence of the human T-cell lymphotropic virus type 1, particularly in individuals living in or coming from this virus's endemic areas. The presence of the virus in Lennert lymphoma-like tissues indicates that the lymphoma is an adult T-cell leukemia/lymphoma rather than a Lennert lymphoma.

=== Epstein–Barr virus ===
The Epstein–Barr virus infects about 95% of the world's population. It initially causes infectious mononucleosis, non-specific symptoms, or no symptoms but nonetheless enters a latency period in its hosts and thereafter may become active in causing a wide range of lymphoproliferative diseases termed Epstein–Barr virus–associated lymphoproliferative diseases as well as various other diseases (see The role of EBV in disease). An early study reported that 11 of 15 patients expressed Epstein–Barr virus DNA in their Lennert lymphoma tissues. Other studies have reported that this virus is less prevalent in Lennert lymphomas. For example, more recent studies have reported that 8 of 26 patients, 4 of 13 patients, 1 of 10 patients, and none of 6 patients expressed the products made by the Epstein–Barr virus in their Lennert lymphoma tissues. The significance of the presence of the Epstein–Barr virus in Lennert lymphoma is unclear: studies have suggested that its presence in Lennert lymphoma cells is probably not directly involved in its development or severity or, alternatively, is associated with a more severe form of this lymphoma and shorten survival times.

== Histopathology ==
The microscopic examination of Lennert lymphoma tissues commonly shows numerous granuloma-like aggregates of epithelioid histiocytes intermingled with varying numbers of T cells and B cells (i.e., subtypes of lymphocytes). However, some cases of Lennert lymphoma consist of: a) epithelioid histiocytes intermingled with small, similarly appearing, lymphoid cells but without distinct granuloma or b) abundant histiocytic clusters and medium to large sized, atypical lymphoid cells. In one study, more than 90% of the T cells in the Lennert lymphoma tissues expressed Cd3, i.e., a protein complex that is a co-receptor on T cells. In the study of 26 patients with Lennert lymphomas, all 26 patients' lymphomas had CD3-expressing cells, 24 had CD4-expressing cells, and 5 had CD8-expressing cells. CD4 is a membrane glycoprotein receptor expressed on helper T-cells; and CD8 is a transmembrane glycoprotein co-receptor for the T-cell receptor on T cells.

== Cytogenetics and gene expressions ==
Lennert lymphoma tissue samples from 15 patients were cultured and the chromosomes in metaphase were analyzed using a standard G banding protocol. The lymphoma tissues of 7 patients exhibited a normal karyotype, i.e., a normal appearing and complete set of chromosomes. However, eight patients' lymphoma tissues had various chromosome cytogenetic abnormalities: two had trisomy of chromosome 7 plus an extra X chromosome, one had trisomy of chromosome 3 and chromosome 5, one had trisomy of chromosome 3 and chromosome 7 plus an additional X chromosome, one had trisomy of chromosome 3, and three had additions and/or deletions to parts of multiply chromosomes. An analysis of pre-selected genes found 455 genes that expressed different levels of these genes' RNA or protein products in the tumor tissues of Lennert lymphoma versus the group of non-Lennert peripheral T-cell lymphoma not otherwise specified tumor tissues: 385 of these products were more highly express in Lennert lymphoma than the group of non-Lennert peripheral T-cell lymphoma not otherwise specified tumor tissues. These findings, if confirmed and further refined in future studies, would be extremely helpful in making the diagnosis of Lennert lymphoma.

== Cancer cells in Lennert lymphoma ==
A 1986 study cited 11 publications which suggested that the cancer cells in Lennert lymphoma were T cells. The study agreed with this suggestion based on finding that their patient with Lennert lymphoma had a small portion of tumor tissue T cells which were hypotetraploid, i.e., missing one or more chromosomes. The study suggested that this small percentage of T cells were the malignant cells in Lennert lymphoma. In the same year, a study co-authored by Karl Lennert found that the T4-expressing lymphocytes but not the other cells types in the Lennert lymphoma tissues of four patients were rapidly proliferating (i.e., rapidly growing and multiplying) based on their levels of the cell proliferation marker Ki-67. This study also found that some of these rapidly proliferating lymphocytes had morphological features found in cancerous lymphocytes. Based on these finding, the study suggested that the rapidly proliferating, T4-expressing T cells are the cancer cells in Lennert lymphomas. Another study also suggested that CD4-expressing T cells were the cancer cells in Lennert lymphomas based on their being the most prevalent T cells in the tumor tissues of 8 of 12 Lennert lymphoma cases. While studies agree that T cells are the malignant cell in Lennert lymphoma, the exact type of T cell that is cancerous in Lennert lymphoma is controversial. Studies have proposed that the malignant cells in Lennert Lymphoma are CD4-expressing T helper cells whereas other studies have proposed that CD-4-expressing cytotoxic T cells are the malignant cells in this lymphoma. Further studies are needed to define the exact type of cell that is malignant in Lennert lymphoma.

== Diagnosis ==
Due to the various characteristics used to define Lennert Lymphoma, the correct diagnosis of it can be difficult. For example, among 340 cases of peripheral T cell lymphoma not otherwise specified, 28 were diagnosed as Lennert lymphomas. However, the agreement on this diagnosis by 4 experts was only 58%. Currently, Lennert lymphoma is diagnosed based primarily on its clinical presentation, microscopic histopathology, and immunohistochemistry (e.g., the expression of certain proteins such as CD3, CD4, and CD8 in the tumor cells). As indicated in previous sections, the diagnosis of Lennert lymphoma a) should test the tumor tissue for the presence of the human T-cell lymphotropic virus type 1 which, if present, indicates that this lymphoma is an adult T-cell leukemia/lymphoma and b) consider the possibility that the lymphoma is a follicular helper T-cell lymphoma or angioimmunoblastic T cell lymphoma if its tissues have appreciable numbers of follicular helper T-cells and/or other features of follicular helper T cell lymphomas.

== Treatment and prognosis ==
Due to its rarity, varying definitions, and lack of clinical trial studies, the best treatment(s) for Lennert lymphoma are unclear. Consequently, these treatments have used drugs or other methods that have been used to treat other types of peripheral T-cell lymphomas. A study of 26 patients with Lennert lymphomas treated a) 13 patients with the CHOP regime of cyclophosphamide, doxorubicin, vincristine, and prednisolone; b) 9 patients with the THP-COP regimen of pirarubicin, cyclophosphamide, vincristine, and prednisolone); c) 1 patient with the CVP regimen of cyclophosphamide, vincristine, and prednisolone); d) 1 patient with etoposide; and e) 1 patient with corticosteroids, One patient received no therapy. Eleven of the 24 patients treated with chemotherapy (i.e., omitting the patients treated with corticosteroids or untreated) had complete remissions or complete remissions, unconfirmed. Overall, 7 patients died of Lennert lymphoma or complications of their lymphomas, 2 died of causes unrelated to their lymphomas, and 5 dropped out during the follow-up period. With a median follow-up time of 23 months (range 1 to 71 months), 10 of these 26 patients were alive 52 months after starting their treatment. However, 15 of these patients had lymphomas that expressed one or more marker proteins suggesting that they were follicular helper T cell lymphomas (see above "Follicular helper T cell lymphoma" section). None of these patients were alive whereas 8 of the 11 patients with Lennert lymphomas that did not express one or more of these marker proteins were alive 52 months after beginning treatment. The Kaplan-Meier estimator indicated the survival of the 11 patients with tumors that did not bear these marker proteins was significantly (p-value=0.011) longer than the 15 patients with tumors that did bear these marker proteins. Another study reported that of 5 patients treated with CHOP one had died from the disease 4.5 years after treatment and 4 were alive 5 years after treatment. This group of patients did not include those whose lymphomas were considered to be follicular helper T cell lymphomas. In another study, 29 patients with Lennert lymphoma and 292 patients with other types of Peripheral T-cell lymphomas not otherwise specified received a combination chemotherapy or in rare cases a single agent chemotherapy or no chemotherapy. The 14 year survival rates for patients with Lennert lymphoma, 56%, was significantly (p-value=003, Logrank test) greater than the 10% survival rate for patients with other types of peripheral T-cell lymphomas not otherwise specified. Patients found positive for the human T-cell lymphotropic virus type 1 on screening were not included in these study groups. A study of a patient with a forehead Lennert lymphoma without evidence of this lymphoma in other tissues was treated with cyclophosphamide, liposome-encapsulated doxorubicin, vincristine, and prednisone tablets. This patient had no evidence of recurrent disease 20 months after starting this therapy.

== See also ==
- Cutaneous T-cell lymphoma
- Pleomorphic T-cell lymphoma
- Peripheral T-cell lymphoma not otherwise specified
