= Bayard D. Clarkson =

American physician (1926–2025)

Bayard Delafield Clarkson Sr. (July 15, 1926 – December 20, 2025) was an American physician, hematologist and oncologist.

== Life and career ==
Clarkson was born in New York City on July 15, 1926. He is the son of the wealthy banker, Robert Livingston Clarkson Sr. (1892–1969), who was the president of Chase National Bank from 1928 to 1929. R. L. Clarkson Sr. and his wife Cora G. Clarkson née Shields (1897–1981) had two other sons, Robert Livingston Clarkson Jr. (1924–1965) and Peter Schuyler Clarkson (1930–1950). The Clarkson family is related to Matthew Clarkson (1758–1825) and is connected to Clarkson University. When the attack on Pearl Harbor occurred, Bayard Clarkson was attending New Hampshire's St. Paul's School. In December 1943 he enlisted in the U.S. Navy's aviation program. However, he was diagnosed with inactive tuberculosis and judged ineligible for active duty. Thereupon, he joined the American Field Service (AFS). In the summer of 1944, AFS sent him orders for two weeks of basic training, after which he was sent overseas in August 1944. From early September 1944 through March 1945 he served in Italy with Unit CM 90 of the AFS. In the spring of 1945 he volunteered for service in the evacuation of Bergen-Belsen concentration camp. In July 1945, he shipped out from Copenhagen. In autumn 1945 he matriculated at Yale University.

After graduating from Yale, Clarkson studied medicine at the Columbia University College of Physicians and Surgeons, where he graduated with an M.D. in 1952. At New York Hospital (now called Weill Cornell Medical Center), he served his medical internship and residency in endocrinology and hematology. In 1958 he became a Special Lasker Fellow in Clinical Chemotherapy at (what became in 1960) the Memorial Sloan Kettering Cancer Center (MSKCC), where he continued working and coauthoring articles until 2017. At MSKCC he became in 1970 the Chief of the Hematology Service and in 1980 the Enid A. Haupt Chair of Therapeutic Research. He was from 1975 to 1989 the MSKCC's Chief of the Hematology/Lymphoma Service.

At the beginning of his career of MSKCC he worked with three outstanding chemotherapy pioneers, David Karnofsky, Cornelius Rhoads, and Joseph Burchenal. Clarkson and his colleagues were among the first to develop effective therapies for adults with acute leukemias and lymphomas. Much of his work focused on the search for selectively targetable differences between normal cells and abnormal stem cells that are quiescent (but potentially proliferative) in CML (Chronic Myelogenous Leukemia). He was a leading expert on the "intracellular signaling pathways that are altered by the BCR/ABL fusion genes".

In an article published in 1960, of which Clarkson was the lead author, he first described in great detail a puzzling, ultimately fatal case of recurrent cyclical edema and circulatory shock due to increased vascular permeability. Since as far back as the 1980s, that rare illness has been formally known as Systemic Capillary Leak Syndrome and informally called Clarkson Disease or Clarkson’s Disease.

From 1968 to 1992, Clarkson was a trustee of Cold Spring Harbor Laboratory. From 1973 to 1974 he was the president of the American Society of Clinical Oncology (ASCO). From 1980 to 1981 he was the president of the American Association for Cancer Research (AACR).

In 1946 in Keene, New Hampshire he married Virginia Lomax Clark (1926–2019). They had three daughters and one son.

Clarkson died on December 20, 2025, at the age of 99.

== Selected publications ==
- Oettgen, Herbert F.; Stephenson, Phyllis A.; Schwartz, Morton K.; Leeper, Robert D.; Tallal, Lisa; Tan, Charlotte C.; Clarkson, Bayard D.; Golbey, Robert B.; Krakoff, Irwin H.; Karnofsky, David A.; Murphy, M. Lois; Burchenal, Joseph H. (1970). "Toxicity of e. Coli L-asparaginase in man". Cancer. 25 (2): 253–278. doi:10.1002/1097-0142(197002)25:2<253::AID-CNCR2820250204>3.0.CO;2-U. PMID 4905153. S2CID 45831728.
- Clarkson, Bayard D. (1972). "Acute myelocytic leukemia in adults". Cancer. 30 (6): 1572–1582. doi:10.1002/1097-0142(197212)30:6<1572::AID-CNCR2820300624>3.0.CO;2-M. PMID 4509106. S2CID 28734241.
- Polliack, A.; Lampen, N.; Clarkson, B. D.; De Harven, E.; Bentwich, Z.; Siegal, F. P.; Kunkel, H. G. (1973). "Identification of Human B and T Lymphocytes by Scanning Electron Microscopy". Journal of Experimental Medicine. 138 (3): 607–624. doi:10.1084/jem.138.3.607. PMC 2139412. PMID 4542254. S2CID 14750342.
- Andreeff, M.; Darzynkiewicz, Z.; Sharpless, TK; Clarkson, BD; Melamed, MR (1980). "Discrimination of human leukemia subtypes by flow cytometric analysis of cellular DNA and RNA". Blood. 55 (2): 282–293. doi:10.1182/blood.V55.2.282.282. PMID 6928106.
- Sokal, JE; Cox, EB; Baccarani, M.; Tura, S.; Gomez, GA; Robertson, JE; Tso, CY; Braun, TJ; Clarkson, BD; Cervantes, F. (1984). "Prognostic discrimination in "good-risk" chronic granulocytic leukemia". Blood. 63 (4): 789–799. doi:10.1182/blood.V63.4.789.789. PMID 6584184.
- Lowenthal, Dennis A.; Straus, David J.; Campbell, Susanne Wise; Gold, Jonathan W. M.; Clarkson, Bayard D.; Koziner, Benjamin (1988). "AIDS-related lymphoid neoplasia. The memorial hospital experience". Cancer. 61 (11): 2325–2337. doi:10.1002/1097-0142(19880601)61:11<2325::AID-CNCR2820611130>3.0.CO;2-0. PMID 3365660. S2CID 27843354.
- Gaynor, Jeffrey J.; Feuer, Eric J.; Tan, Claire C.; Wu, Danny H.; Little, Claudia R.; Straus, David J.; Clarkson, Bayard D.; Brennan, Murray F. (1993). "On the Use of Cause-Specific Failure and Conditional Failure Probabilities: Examples from Clinical Oncology Data". Journal of the American Statistical Association. 88 (422): 400–409. doi:10.1080/01621459.1993.10476289.
