= Lymphomatoid papulosis =

- Specialty: Dermatology

Lymphomatoid papulosis (LyP) is a rare skin disorder.

== Prevalence ==
The overall prevalence rate of lymphomatoid papulosis is estimated at at least 1.2 cases per 1,000,000 population. This rare condition has only been studied in depth since 1968.

== Presentation ==
It can appear very similar to anaplastic large cell lymphoma. Type "A" is CD30 positive, while type "B" is CD30 negative.

It has been described as "clinically benign but histologically malignant."

Types of lymphomatoid papulosis
A	Wedge-shaped clusters of large atypical lymphocytes that are CD30+, interspersed with a mixed inflammatory infiltrate of neutrophils, histiocytes, and eosinophils.
B	Similar to mycosis fungoides, with bandlike infiltrate and epidermotropism of smaller atypical lymphocytes that may be CD30-.
C	Similar to cutaneous anaplastic large-cell lymphoma, with larger clusters or sheets of large anaplastic CD30+ cells without the interspersed mixed infiltrate of Type A.
D	Similar to CD8+ epidermotropic cutaneous T-cell lymphoma, with large CD8+ and CD30+ lymphocytes that often stain with cytotoxic markers (TIA-1, granzyme, perforin).
E	Angioinvasive with small to large angiocentric CD30+ atypical lymphocytes that invade walls of small to medium vessels in dermis or subcutaneously.
F	Perifollicular infiltrates of CD30+ atypical cells with folliculotrophism with or without follicular mucinosis.

== Treatment ==
It may respond to methotrexate or PUVA.

== Prognosis ==
It can evolve into lymphoma.

== See also ==
- Cutaneous T-cell lymphoma
- Parapsoriasis
- Secondary cutaneous CD30+ large cell lymphoma
- List of cutaneous conditions
