= Denileukin diftitox =

Pharmaceutical drug

Clinical data
- Trade names: Ontak, others
- AHFS/Drugs.com: Monograph
- MedlinePlus: a611024
- License data: US DailyMed: Denileukin diftitox
- Routes of administration: Intravenous
- Drug class: Antineoplastic
- ATC code: L01XX29 (WHO)

Legal status
- Legal status: US: ℞-only

Pharmacokinetic data
- Elimination half-life: 70-80 min

Identifiers
- IUPAC name: Diphtheria toxin-Interleukin-2 fusion protein
- CAS Number: 173146-27-5
- IUPHAR/BPS: 7044
- DrugBank: DB00004
- ChemSpider: none
- UNII: 25E79B5CTM
- KEGG: D03682
- ChEMBL: ChEMBL1201550

Chemical and physical data
- Formula: C_{2560}H_{4042}N_{678}O_{799}S_{17}
- Molar mass: 57647.46 g·mol^{−1}

Denileukin diftitox-cxdl
Clinical data
- Pronunciation: DEH-nih-LOO-kin DIF-tih-tox
- Trade names: LYMPHIR
- Other names: E7777; formerly I/ONTAK; DAB_{389}IL-2 (historical)
- AHFS/Drugs.com: monograph
- MedlinePlus: a611024
- License data: US DailyMed: Lymphir
- Pregnancy category: Can cause fetal harm
- Routes of administration: Intravenous infusion
- Drug class: IL-2 receptor-directed cytotoxin; antineoplastic immunotoxin
- ATC code: L01XX29 (WHO)

Legal status
- Legal status: US: ℞-only; FDA-approved 7 August 2024; orphan drug for CTCL and PTCL

Pharmacokinetic data
- Bioavailability: 100% by intravenous administration
- Protein binding: Not formally characterized
- Metabolism: Proteolytic degradation
- Elimination half-life: Approximately 112 minutes, cycle 1 terminal
- Excretion: Proteolytic degradation

Identifiers
- CAS Number: 173146-27-5
- DrugBank: DB00004
- ChemSpider: none
- UNII: 25E79B5CTM

Chemical and physical data
- Molar mass: 58 kDa recombinant fusion protein

Denileukin diftitox, sold under the brand name Ontak from 1999-2014, was an anti-cancer medication approved for the treatment of adults with T-cell lymphoma. It is an IL2-receptor-directed cytotoxin. It is an engineered protein combining interleukin-2 and diphtheria toxin.

Denileukin diftitox-cxdl, sold under the brand name LYMPHIR, is an interleukin-2 (IL-2) receptor–directed cytotoxin (immunotoxin) used to treat cutaneous T-cell lymphoma (CTCL). It is a recombinant fusion protein that combines an IL-2 ligand with a fragment of diphtheria toxin.

In 2024, the U.S. Food and Drug Administration (FDA) approved denileukin diftitox-cxdl in the United States. for the treatment of adults with relapsed or refractory stage I–III CTCL after at least one prior systemic therapy. Denileukin diftitox-cxdl is administered by intravenous infusion.

A prior formulation of denileukin diftitox (marketed as Ontak) was approved in 1999 and was voluntarily withdrawn from the U.S. market in 2014. In 2021, the current more bioactive formulation was also approved in Japan.

== Medical uses ==
In the United States, denileukin diftitox-cxdl is indicated for the treatment of adults with relapsed or refractory stage I–III CTCL after at least one prior systemic therapy.

CTCL is a rare, chronic, and essentially incurable form of cutaneous non-Hodgkin lymphoma. Mycosis fungoides (MF) and Sézary syndrome (SS) account for the majority of CTCL cases. The disease causes cancerous T cells to initially infiltrate the skin, producing debilitating lesions, plaques, severe pruritus (itching), and/or erythroderma; CTCL may also spread to lymph nodes, blood, or visceral organs Because it is incurable and treatment options are limited, patients typically cycle through multiple lines of therapy.

The National Comprehensive Cancer Network (NCCN) Clinical Practice Guidelines in Oncology for Primary Cutaneous Lymphomas list denileukin diftitox-cxdl as a systemic treatment option for relapsed or refractory mycosis fungoides and Sézary syndrome.

== Mechanism of action ==
Denileukin diftitox-cxdl is a recombinant cytotoxic fusion protein consisting of an interleukin-2 (IL-2) (Ala1-Thr133) targeting domain fused to diphtheria toxin fragments A and B (Met1-Thr387)-His.

The IL-2 domain binds to intermediate- and high-affinity IL-2 receptors on the surface of target cells, after which the complex is internalized by receptor-mediated endocytosis. Once internalized, the fusion protein intracellularly delivers diphtheria toxin and leads to inhibition of protein synthesis and death of these IL-2R-expressing cells.

The drug targets cells with IL-2R expression. Study data demonstrate that denileukin diftitox produces a transient reduction in IL-2R-positive immunosuppressive regulatory T cells (Tregs), after dosing. Transient Treg depletion augments host anti-tumor activity and - is an immunologic component of the drug’s mechanism of action.

The human IL-2 receptor has been characterized in 3 forms: low, intermediate, and high affinity. The high affinity IL-2 receptor is a complex of all 3 distinct proteins (CD25, CD122 and CD132). Some cells expressing IL-2 receptor subunits include activated T-lymphocytes, B-cells, natural killer (NK) cells, malignant T cells and Tregs; all having varying degrees of affinity for IL-2 receptor.

Other mechanisms of action have suggested a level of synergy with other biologically-mediated immunotherapies (ie CAR-T cells, checkpoint inhibitors) in which depleting T reg cells in combination with these agents leads to increased antitumor responses greater to that achieved by the individual agents alone

== Pharmacokinetics ==
Denileukin diftitox-cxdl is administered intravenously. In patients with CTCL, the terminal half-life is 112 minutes (Cycle 1). It is primarily eliminated by proteolytic degradation. Anti-drug antibodies have been observed and may reduce measured serum concentrations but did not have any negative impact on efficacy or safety in patients treated in a pivotal trial.

== History ==
=== Original denileukin diftitox (Ontak, 1999–2014) ===
Denileukin diftitox (Ontak) received marketing approval in the United States in 1999 for CTCL; accelerated approval was based on a single phase III trial. In 2006, Eisai, Inc. acquired rights to Ontak from Ligand Pharmaceuticals and assumed U.S. product distribution responsibilities. A second phase III placebo-controlled trial confirmed Ontak’s efficacy and safety profile and formed the basis of full approval in 2008. In 2014, Ontak was voluntarily withdrawn from the market due to supply disruptions.

=== Development of the reformulated agent (E7777 / LYMPHIR, 2013–2025) ===
The 1999 accelerated approval of Ontak included a post marketing commitment to improve the manufacturing purification process to increase product purity. The refined manufacturing process resulted in development of E7777, which is the same recombinant protein as Ontak, but with an improved purity and bioactivity (approximately 1.5-2 times greater specific bioactivity in nonclinical assays) in a lyophilized form.

In 2011, a phase I study was initiated to evaluate E7777 in Japanese patients with T‐cell lymphomas. In 2013, a phase II study was initiated to evaluate E7777 in Japanese patients with relapsed/refractory peripheral T-cell lymphoma (PTCL) and CTCL. Data from these studies led to the full approval of E7777 (Remitoro®) in Japan in 2021; Remitoro was launched in 2021 in Japan by Eisai. Also in 2013, phase III pivotal Study 302 (NCT01871727) was initiated to evaluate the safety and efficacy of E7777 relapsed/refractory CTCL to support regulatory approval in the United States.

In 2016, Dr. Reddy’s Laboratories acquired the exclusive global rights (excluding Japan and certain parts of Asia) to E7777 from Eisai. In 2021, Citius Pharmaceuticals, Inc. acquired Dr. Reddy’s licensing agreement for E7777 governing commercialization rights, while Eisai continued clinical trial Study 302.

In 2024, the FDA approved denileukin diftitox-cxdl (LYMPHIR); -cxdl being the nonproprietary name suffix. In 2025, denileukin diftitox-cxdl was launched in the United States as LYMPHIR by Citius Oncology, Inc., a subsidiary of Citius Pharmaceuticals, Inc.

== Research ==
=== Clinical trials ===
Denileukin diftitox-cxdl was evaluated in the phase III pivotal Study 302 (NCT01871727), a multicenter, open-label, single-arm trial in adults with relapsed or refractory stage I–IV CTCL (mycosis fungoides and/or Sézary syndrome) after at least one prior systemic therapy. The study consisted of an initial Lead-In part followed by the Main Study:

- Lead-In: A continual reassessment method (CRM) was used to establish the maximum tolerated dose of E7777 and to select the dose of E7777 to be used in the Main Study.
- Main Study: The objectives of the Main Study were to assess the efficacy and safety of E7777 in Stages I to III subjects with recurrent and persistent CTCL. The primary endpoint was objective response rate (ORR) assessed using a global response score.

In the primary efficacy analysis set (n=69), the ORR was 36.2% (95% CI 25.0–48.7), including complete responses in 8.7%. The median duration of response was 6.5 months (95% CI 5.0 to not estimable), and the median time to response was 1.4 months (0.7–5.6).

In Study 302, serious adverse reactions included capillary leak syndrome, infusion-related reactions, sepsis, skin infection, pyrexia, and rash. The U.S. label carries a boxed warning for capillary leak syndrome. Because the study was single-arm, comparative effectiveness versus other systemic CTCL therapies were not assessed.

=== Other investigational uses ===
Outside its approved indication in CTCL, denileukin diftitox-cxdl is being studied in investigator-initiated trials as an immunomodulatory agent in combination with immune checkpoint inhibitors and as part of preconditioning strategies intended to reduce host Tregs before cellular therapies (CAR-T).

- Pembrolizumab (anti-PD-1): A phase I/II study (NCT05200559) assessing Treg depletion to enhance checkpoint inhibitor activity in recurrent or metastatic solid tumors, and
- CAR-T lymphodepletion: A phase I/II study (NCT04855253) evaluating denileukin diftitox-cxdl prior to lymphodepleting chemotherapy and CAR-T cell therapy in relapsed/refractory B-cell lymphomas (DLBCL).

== Contraindications ==
The U.S. prescribing information lists no contraindications.

== Adverse effects ==
In clinical studies, the most common adverse reactions (≥20%) were elevated liver enzymes, low serum albumin, nausea, edema, low hemoglobin, fatigue, musculoskeletal pain, rash, chills, constipation, fever, and capillary leak syndrome.

Serious adverse reactions may include capillary leak syndrome, infusion-related reactions, hepatotoxicity, and visual impairment.

The U.S. prescribing information carries a boxed warning for capillary leak syndrome. For complete safety information, including other special-population considerations, refer to the U.S. prescribing information.

== Society and culture ==
Denileukin diftitox-cxdl is marketed in the United States under the brand name Lymphir. Denileukin diftitox is marketed in Japan under the brand name Remitoro.

== Legal status ==
In 1999, denileukin diftitox was approved by the US Food and Drug Administration (FDA) for the treatment of cutaneous T-cell lymphoma. It was voluntarily withdrawn from the market in 2014 due to manufacturing difficulties. Subsequently, a new formulation of deniluekin diftitox was developed (also known as E7777 or denileukin diftitox-cxdl) and approved in Japan in 2021 (marketed as Remitoro) and in the US in 2024 (marketed as Lymphir).

In the United States, denileukin diftitox-cxdl is a prescription-only biologic approved by the FDA under a biologics license application (BLA) for the treatment of adults with relapsed or refractory stage I–III CTCL after at least one prior systemic therapy. The earlier denileukin diftitox product (Ontak) was voluntarily withdrawn from the U.S. market by Eisai in 2014. Following withdrawal of Ontak’s BLA in 2026, LYMPHIR became the sole U.S.‑licensed reference product for denileukin diftitox. The U.S. prescribing information includes an FDA boxed warning for capillary leak syndrome, reflecting a risk of potentially fatal complications.

== See also ==
- Cutaneous T-cell lymphoma
- Mycosis fungoides
- Sézary syndrome
- Immunotoxin
- Interleukin-2
- Orphan drug
