= Granulomatous slack skin =

- Specialty: Dermatology

Granulomatous slack skin (GSS) is a rare cutaneous condition, a variant of lymphoma that typically presents in middle-aged adults.

It is a form of cutaneous T-cell lymphoma and a variant of mycosis fungoides.

== See also ==
- List of cutaneous conditions
