= Ecog =

ECOG may refer to:

- Eastern Cooperative Oncology Group
- Electrocorticography (ECoG)
- Electrocochleography
