= Performance status =

Indicator of general well-being for cancer patients

In medicine (oncology and other fields), performance status is an attempt to quantify cancer patients' general well-being and activities of daily life. This measure is used to determine whether they can receive chemotherapy, whether dose adjustment is necessary, and as a measure for the required intensity of palliative care. It is also used in oncological randomized controlled trials as a measure of quality of life.

== Scoring systems ==
There are various scoring systems. The most generally used are the Karnofsky score and the Zubrod score, the latter being used in publications by the WHO. For children, the Lansky score is used. Another common system is the Eastern Cooperative Oncology Group (ECOG) system. Parallel scoring systems include the Global Assessment of Functioning (GAF) score, which has been incorporated as the fifth axis of the Diagnostic and Statistical Manual (DSM) of psychiatry.

=== Karnofsky scoring ===
The Karnofsky Performance Score (KPS) ranking runs from 100 to 0, where 100 is "perfect" health and 0 is death. Practitioners occasionally assign performance scores in between standard intervals of 10. This scoring system is named after Dr. David A. Karnofsky, who described the scale with Dr. Walter H. Abelmann, Dr. Lloyd F. Craver, and Dr. Joseph H. Burchenal in 1948. The primary purpose of its development was to allow physicians to evaluate a patient's ability to survive chemotherapy for cancer.

- 100 – Normal; no complaints; no evidence of disease.
- 90 – Able to carry on normal activity, minor signs or symptoms of disease.
- 80 – Normal activity with effort; some signs or symptoms of disease.
- 70 – Cares for self; unable to carry on normal activity or to do active work.
- 60 – Requires occasional assistance but is able to care for most of their personal needs.
- 50 – Requires considerable assistance and frequent medical care.
- 40 – Disabled; requires special care and assistance.
- 30 – Severely disabled; hospital admission is indicated although death not imminent.
- 20 – Very sick; hospital admission necessary; active supportive treatment necessary.
- 10 – Moribund; fatal processes progressing rapidly.
- 0 – Possibly dead

=== ECOG/WHO/Zubrod score ===
The Eastern Cooperative Oncology Group (ECOG) score (published by Oken et al. in 1982), also called the WHO or Zubrod score (after C. Gordon Zubrod), runs from 0 to 5, with 0 denoting perfect health and 5 death: Its advantage over the Karnofsky scale lies in its simplicity.

- 0 – Asymptomatic (Fully active, able to carry on all predisease activities without restriction)
- 1 – Symptomatic but completely ambulatory (Restricted in physically strenuous activity but ambulatory and able to carry out work of a light or sedentary nature. For example, light housework, office work)
- 2 – Symptomatic, <50% in bed during the day (Ambulatory and capable of all self care but unable to carry out any work activities. Up and about more than 50% of waking hours)
- 3 – Symptomatic, >50% in bed, but not bedbound (Capable of only limited self-care, confined to bed or chair 50% or more of waking hours)
- 4 – Bedbound (Completely disabled. Cannot carry on any self-care. Totally confined to bed or chair)
- 5 – Death

=== Lansky score ===
Children, who might have more trouble expressing their experienced quality of life, require a somewhat more observational scoring system suggested and validated by Lansky et al. in 1987:

- 100 – fully active, normal
- 90 – minor restrictions in strenuous physical activity
- 80 – active, but gets tired more quickly
- 70 – greater restriction of play and less time spent in play activity
- 60 – up and around, but active play minimal; keeps busy by being involved in quieter activities
- 50 – lying around much of the day, but gets dressed; no active playing; participates in all quiet play and activities
- 40 – mainly in bed; participates in quiet activities
- 30 – bedbound; needing assistance even for quiet play
- 20 – sleeping often; play entirely limited to very passive activities
- 10 – doesn't play; does not get out of bed
- 0 – unresponsive

== Comparison ==
A translation between the Zubrod and Karnofsky scales that works especially well for healthy patients has been validated in a large sample of lung cancer patients:

- Zubrod 0 equals Karnofsky 90–100
- Zubrod 1 equals Karnofsky 70–80
- Zubrod 2 equals Karnofsky 50–60
- Zubrod 3 equals Karnofsky 30–40
- Zubrod 4 equals Karnofsky 10–20
- Zubrod 5 equals Karnofsky 0
