= Albert Sézary =

Albert Sézary (26 December 1880, Algiers – 1 December 1956, Paris) was a French dermatologist and syphilogist.

He served as a hospital interne in Algiers (from 1901) and Paris (from 1905), where he worked with neurologists Joseph Jules Dejerine and Fulgence Raymond and dermatologists Lucien Jacquet and Edouard Jeanselme. He received his medical doctorate in 1909, and from 1919 to 1926 was laboratory chief in the clinic for skin and syphilitic diseases at the Hôpital Saint-Louis. In 1927, he became an associate professor for skin and venereal diseases, and two years later was appointed chef de service at the Hôpitaux Broca and Saint-Louis.

In 1921 he introduced the combination of arsenic and bismuth for the treatment of syphilis. He also proposed pentavalent arsenic as a treatment for general paresis of the insane.

== Medical terms ==
- "Sézary cells": An atypical T-lymphocyte that contains vacuoles filled with mucopolysaccharide.
- "Sézary's disease" (Sézary's syndrome): A form of cutaneous T-cell lymphoma. A variant of mycosis fungoides.

== Selected works ==
- Sur la pathogénie du tabes et des affections parasyphilitiques en général, 1909.
- Microbiologie de la syphilis, 1913.
- Nouvelle méthode de vaccination antityphoïdique, 1918.
- Précis de syphiligraphie et des maladies vénériennes (with Edouard Jeanselme), 1925.
- La syphilis du système nerveux: pathologie générale, thérapeutique et prophylaxie, 1938.
- Le traitement de la syphilis, 1930, 4th edition 1942.
