= Premycotic phase =

Stage of an immune system cancer

The premycotic phase is a phase of mycosis fungoides in which a patient has areas of red, scaly, itchy skin on areas of the body that are usually not exposed to sun. This is early-phase mycosis fungoides, but it is hard to diagnose the rash as mycosis fungoides during this phase. The premycotic phase may last from months to decades.
