= Karl Lennert =

German physician and pathologist (1921–2012)

- Born: 4 June 1921; Fürth, Germany
- Died: 27 August 2012 (aged 91); Kiel, Germany
- Citizenship: German
- Education: University of Erlangen-Nuremberg (Friedrich-Alexander Universitat)
- Known for: Research in pathology; Conception of the "Kiel classification" for malignant lymphomas
- Awards: Schleiden Medal; Robert Koch Medal (Gold, 1993); Rudolf Virchow Medal; Ernst Jung Prize (1979)
- Scientific career
- Fields: Medicine & pathology
- Academic advisors: Arnold Lauche, M.D.

Karl Lennert, M.D. (4 June 1921 – 27 August 2012) was a German physician and pathologist.

== Early life and education ==
Lennert was born in Fürth, which is now contiguous with Nuremberg, in Bavaria. After graduating from high school there, Karl attended medical school from 1939 to 1945 at the Friedrich-Alexander Universitat of Erlangen (now the University of Erlangen-Nuremberg). After World War II, Lennert remained in Erlangen until 1950 as a resident physician in the Institute of Pathology. After another year of postgraduate study at the Max Planck Institute for Biophysical Chemistry in Göttingen, he joined the department of pathology at Johann Wolfgang Goethe University in Frankfurt-am-Main. There, under the direction of Professor Arnold Lauche, he began his lifelong study of hematopoietic diseases, with emphasis on malignant lymphomas.

== Career ==
In 1963, Lennert was asked to chair the Institute of Pathology at Christian-Albrechts-University (CAU) in Kiel. This was a prestigious appointment, because at that time, 75% of department chairs at CAU were the sons of prominent Professors of Medicine in Germany. His students included Reza Parwaresch, Martin-Leo Hansmann, H.J. Radzun, Alfred Feller, Hans-Konrad Müller-Hermelink, and Peter M. Banks. Lennert worked closely with clinicians in the Collaborative Research Centre 111 of the German Research Foundation, principally represented by Drs. Arnulf Thiede and Wolfram Sterry. Lennert was the founding president of the European Association of Hematopathology. In 1989 he became a Professor Emeritus in Kiel.

== Kiel Classification System for Lymphomas ==
Around 1975, Lennert began work on a system of nosological classification for malignant lymph node tumors (non-Hodgkin lymphomas) that was predicated on the cytomorphological and biochemical attributes of developing lymphoid cells. It was meant to supplement or supersede other schemes that were existence at that time, including the Lukes-Collins system and the Rappaport classification. Lennert's paradigm quickly gained traction among pathologists in Europe and became known as the "Kiel classification". Later, other systems of nosology for malignant lymphoma were introduced, including the Revised European American Lymphoma Classification (REAL) scheme in 1994, and the World Health Organization system of 2001, which are now preferentially in clinical use. Dr. Lennert is also recognized for first describing a variant of peripheral T-cell lymphoma in 1952, which he termed "lymphoepithelioid lymphoma." It is now commonly and eponymously called "Lennert lymphoma" or "Lennert's lymphoma." In total, Lennert contributed over 300 scholarly papers and 4 textbooks to the medical literature during his working life.

Lennert accumulated a large and unique teaching archive of lymphoma cases in his department at Kiel. He had developed a personal-professional relationship with Uwe Barschel, a prominent West German politician in the 1980s, and Barschel assured him that funds would be supplied to preserve the archive in a special institute at the time of Lennert's retirement. However, the politician was involved in a scandal in 1987 and he died at that time under questionable circumstances; hence, his promise to Dr. Lennert was never fulfilled.

== Honors and awards ==
Lennert received several professional honors and awards during his long career. These included election to membership of the German Academy of Sciences Leopoldina in 1966; the Schleiden Medal; the Robert Koch Medal; the Rudolf Virchow Medal and the Ernst Jung Prize. Lennert also received honorary doctorates from Friedrich-Alexander Universitat, the Ghent University, the University of Madrid, and the University of Köln.

He was a fellow of the Norwegian Academy of Science and Letters from 1986.

== Personal life ==
Dr. Lennert was married to another physician, Dr. Amanda Heyer. They had a daughter, Monika (married name Boske), who is also a physician in Wurzburg, Germany.
