= Non-mycosis fungoides CD30− cutaneous large T-cell lymphoma =

- Specialty: Dermatology

Non-mycosis fungoides CD30− cutaneous large T-cell lymphoma is a cutaneous condition that usually presents as solitary or generalized plaques, nodules, or tumors of short duration.

== See also ==
- Cutaneous T-cell lymphoma
- CD30+ cutaneous T-cell lymphoma
