= Pleomorphic T-cell lymphoma =

- Specialty: Dermatology

Pleomorphic T-cell lymphoma (also known as "Non-mycosis fungoides CD30− pleomorphic small/medium sized cutaneous T-cell lymphoma") is a cutaneous condition characterized by a 5-year survival rate of 62%.

== See also ==
- Cutaneous T-cell lymphoma
- Non-mycosis fungoides CD30− cutaneous large T-cell lymphoma
- Skin lesion
