= Sézary disease =

Rare type of lymphoma

- Other names: Sézary's disease, Sézary('s) syndrome
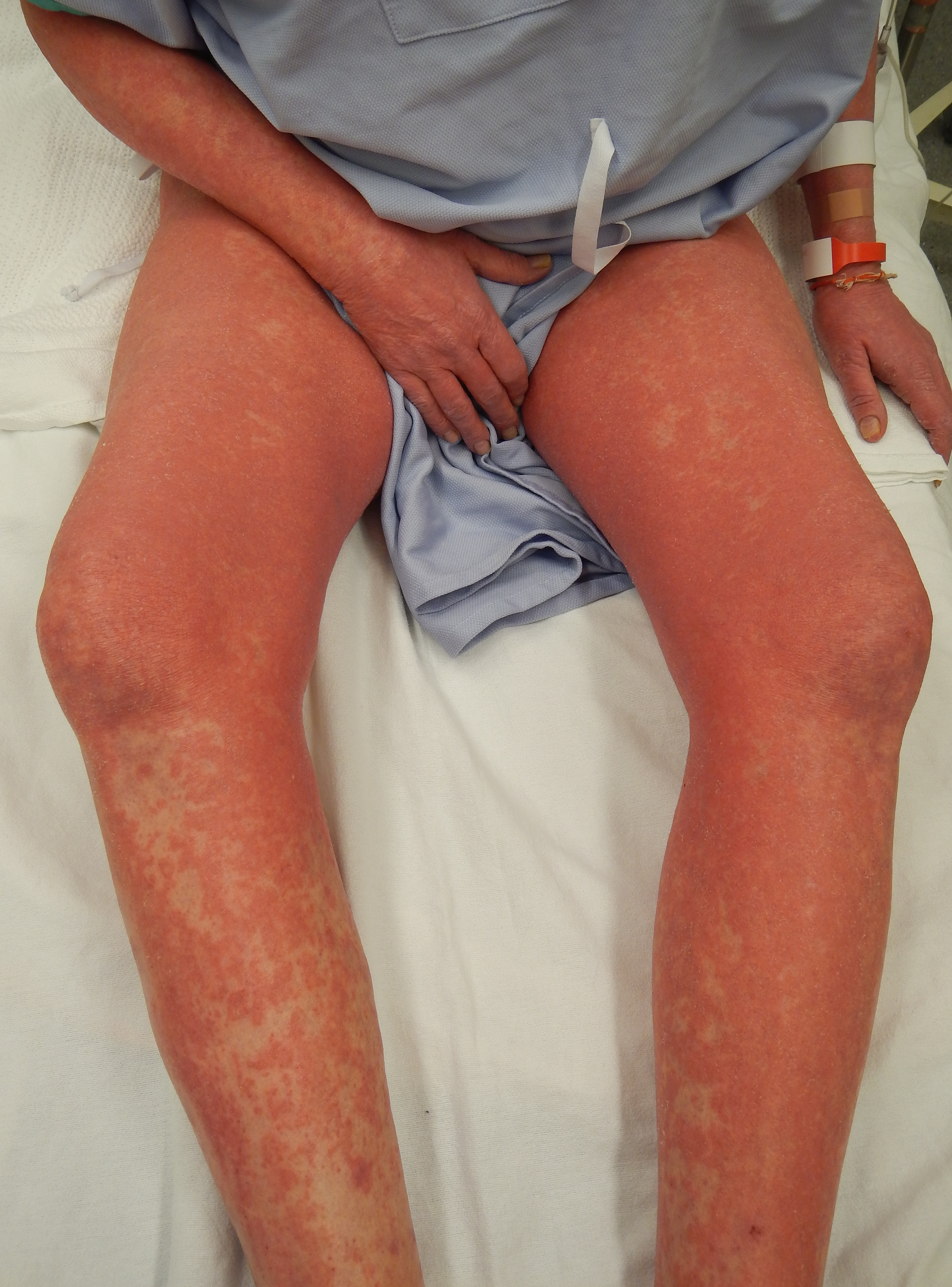
- The bright red rash of Sezary syndrome
- Pronunciation: /ˌseɪˌzɑːˈriː/
- Specialty: Oncology, dermatology

Sézary disease, or Sézary syndrome, is a type of cutaneous T-cell lymphoma that was first described by Albert Sézary. The affected T cells, known as Sézary's cells or Lutzner cells, have pathological quantities of mucopolysaccharides. Sézary disease is sometimes considered a late stage of mycosis fungoides with lymphadenopathy.

== Signs and symptoms ==
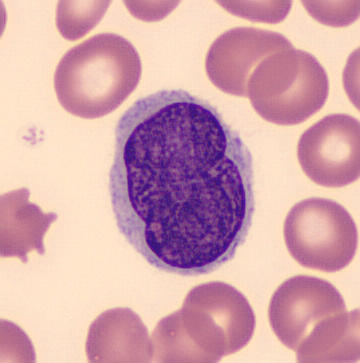
Sézary cell: pleomorphic abnormal T cell with the characteristic cerebriform nuclei (Peripheral blood - MGG stain)

Sézary disease and mycosis fungoides are cutaneous T-cell lymphomas having a primary manifestation in the skin. The disease's origin is a peripheral CD4+ T-lymphocyte, although rarer CD8+/CD4- cases have been observed. Epidermotropism (lymphocytes residing in the epidermis) by neoplastic CD4+ lymphocytes with the formation of Pautrier's microabscesses is the hallmark sign of the disease. Although the condition can affect people of all ages, it is commonly diagnosed in adults over age 60. The dominant signs and symptoms of the disease are:

1. Generalized erythroderma – redness of the skin
2. Lymphadenopathy – swollen, enlarged lymph nodes
3. Atypical T cells – malignant lymphocytes known as "Sézary cells" seen in the peripheral blood with typical cerebriform nuclei (brain-shaped, convoluted nuclei)
4. Hepatosplenomegaly– enlarged liver and spleen
5. Palmoplantar keratoderma – thickening of the palms of the hands, and soles of the feet

== Diagnosis ==
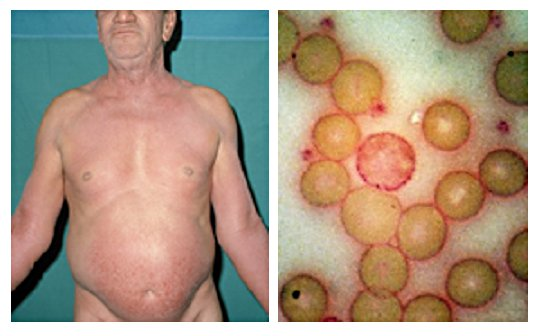
Sézary syndrome in a 61-year-old man presenting in 1972 with unrelenting itchiness of six months' duration. On the right is his peripheral blood film stained with Periodic Acid-Schiff (PAS) showing a neoplastic T cell (Sézary cell).

Those who have Sézary disease often present skin lesions that do not heal with normal medication. A blood test generally reveals any change in the levels of lymphocytes in the blood, which is often associated with a cutaneous T-cell lymphoma. Finally, a biopsy of a skin lesion can be performed to rule out any other causes.

The immunohistochemical features are very similar to those presented in mycosis fungoides except for the following differences:

1. More monotonous cellular infiltrates (large, clustered atypical pagetoid cells) in Sézary syndrome
2. Sometimes absent epidermotropism
3. Increased lymph node involvement with infiltrates of Sézary syndrome.

== Treatment ==
Treatment typically includes some combination of photodynamic therapy, radiation therapy, chemotherapy, and biologic therapy.

Treatments are often combined with phototherapy and chemotherapy, though pure chemotherapy is rarely used today. No single treatment type has revealed clear-cut benefits in comparison to others; treatment for all cases remains problematic.

=== Radiation therapy ===
A number of types of radiation therapy may be used, including total skin electron therapy. While this therapy does not generally result in systemic toxic effects, it can produce side effects involving the skin. It is only available at a few institutions.

=== Chemotherapy ===
Romidepsin, vorinostat and a few others are second-line drugs for cutaneous T-cell lymphoma. Mogamulizumab has been approved in Japan and the United States.

The FDA has approved denileukin diftitox-cxdl (Lymphir) for the treatment of patients with relapsed/refractory cutaneous T-cell lymphoma who have received at least one prior systemic therapy. Lymphir injection (300 mcg) is indicated for the treatment of adult patients with relapsed or refractory stage I-III cutaneous T-cell lymphoma after at least one prior systemic therapy.

== Epidemiology ==
In the Western population, there are around 3 cases of Sézary syndrome per 1,000,000 people. Sézary disease is more common in males with a ratio of 2:1, and the mean age of diagnosis is between 55 and 60 years of age.

== See also ==
- List of cutaneous conditions
