= Secondary cutaneous CD30+ large-cell lymphoma =

- Specialty: Dermatology

Secondary cutaneous CD30+ large-cell lymphoma is a cutaneous condition that may arise in cases of mycosis fungoides, and in patients with lymphomatoid papulosis.

== See also ==
- Cutaneous T-cell lymphoma
- CD30+ cutaneous T-cell lymphoma
- Skin lesion
- List of cutaneous conditions
