= Capillary leak syndrome =

Escape of blood plasma through capillary walls into surrounding tissues

- Other names: SCLS, Clarkson's Disease, Capillary hyperpermeability syndrome
- Specialty: Hematology, immunology, intensive care medicine
- Symptoms: hemoconcentration, hypotension, hypoalbuminemia, edema, compartment syndromes
- Differential diagnosis: polycythemia, polycythemia vera, hyperviscosity syndrome, sepsis, disseminated intravascular coagulation, other cases involving internal blood loss
- Treatment: IVIG, theophylline, terbutaline, montelukast

Capillary leak syndrome, or vascular leak syndrome, is characterized by the escape of blood plasma through capillary walls, from the blood circulatory system to surrounding tissues, muscle compartments, organs or body cavities. It is a phenomenon most commonly witnessed in sepsis, and less frequently in autoimmune diseases, differentiation syndrome, engraftment syndrome, hemophagocytic lymphohistiocytosis, the ovarian hyperstimulation syndrome, viral hemorrhagic fevers, and snakebite and ricin poisoning. Pharmaceuticals, including the chemotherapy medications gemcitabine and denileukin diftitox, as well as certain interleukins and monoclonal antibodies, can also cause capillary leaks. These conditions and factors are sources of secondary capillary leak syndrome, and it is often difficult to diagnose and treat because of its complex pathophysiology and the absence of standardized diagnostic criteria.

Systemic capillary leak syndrome (SCLS), also called Clarkson's disease, or primary capillary leak syndrome, is a rare, grave and episodic medical condition observed largely in otherwise healthy individuals mostly in middle age. It is characterized by self-reversing episodes during which the endothelial cells which line the capillaries, usually of the extremities, separate for one to three days, causing a leakage of plasma mainly into the muscle compartments of the arms and legs. The abdomen, the central nervous system, and the organs (including the lungs) are typically spared, but the extravasation in the extremities is sufficiently massive to cause circulatory shock and compartment syndromes, with a dangerous hypotension (low blood pressure), hemoconcentration (thickening of the blood) and hypoalbuminemia (drop in albumin, a major protein) in the absence of other causes for such abnormalities. SCLS is thus a limb- and life-threatening illness, because each episode has the potential to cause damage to limb muscles and nerves, as well as to vital organs due to limited perfusion. It is often misdiagnosed as polycythemia, polycythemia vera, hyperviscosity syndrome, or sepsis. A thorough scientific primer on SCLS was published in late 2024.

== Symptoms ==
Most SCLS patients succumb to viral infections manifesting themselves by way of flu-like symptoms (like a runny nose), gastro-intestinal disorders (diarrhea or vomiting), or general weakness or pain in the limbs, but others get no particular or consistent warning signs ahead of their episodes. They subsequently develop thirst and lightheadedness and the following conditions measurable in a hospital emergency-room setting:

- hemoconcentration (elevated hematocrit and hemoglobin readings, with hematocrit levels >49% in men and >43% in women, not because of an absolute increase in them but because of the leak of plasma);
- very low blood pressure (profound arterial hypotension, with systolic blood pressure levels <90 mm Hg);
- albumin deficiency (hypoalbuminemia measuring <3.0 g/dL);
- partial or generalized edema, and cold extremities;
- a paraprotein in the blood (an MGUS in approximately 80% of cases).

== Cause ==
Although the precise molecular cause of SCLS remains undetermined, scientific research since 2010, conducted mainly at a unit (NIAID) of the U.S. National Institutes of Health, has shed some light on its biological and chemical roots. The study of the peripheral microvasculature from patients’ biopsy specimens has not evidenced gross anomalies, disrupted angiogenesis, or inflammatory cells or other factors suggestive of a disorder prone to damage the blood vessels by inflammation. The absence of structural abnormalities is thus consistent with the hypothesis of some kind of defective but curiously reversible cellular phenomenon in the capillaries.

Studies suggest that the presence of various inflammatory factors during episodes of SCLS may explain the temporarily abnormal permeability of the endothelial cells lining the inner surface of the capillaries. These include transient spikes in monocyte- and macrophage-associated inflammatory mediators and temporary increases in the proteins vascular endothelial growth factors (VEGF) and angiopoietin-2. The impairment of endothelial cells in laboratory conditions provoked by serum taken from patients who were having episodes of SCLS is also suggestive of biochemical factors at work.

There is no evidence that SCLS is hereditary, and the role of specific gene defects in patients with SCLS, which might program their endothelial cells for an overreaction to external stimuli such as viral infections, has not been established. The significance, if any, of the paraprotein (MGUS) present in most patients with SCLS is unknown, other than it has been a precursor to multiple myeloma in a minority (7% in the largest reported cohort) of SCLS patients.

== Diagnosis ==
SCLS is often difficult to recognize and diagnose on initial presentation, and thus misdiagnoses are frequent. The characteristic triad of profound arterial hypotension, hemoconcentration (elevated hematocrit, leukocytosis, and thrombocytosis), and hypoalbuminemia in the absence of secondary causes of shock and infection, requires diagnosis in a monitored hospital setting during or after an acute episode. The fact that the condition is exceedingly rare – an estimated one per million inhabitants – and that several other diseases exhibit features akin to SCLS, including secondary capillary-leak syndrome or hypoproteinemia, militate against early identification. Preserved consciousness, despite severe shock and hypotension, is an additional and most intriguing clinical manifestation often reported during episodes at hospital admission.

== Treatment ==
The natural history of SCLS episodes indicates they usually resolve spontaneously within 2-to-4 days, and that they consist of two distinct phases:

=== The capillary leak phase ===
The initial stage is the capillary leak phase, lasting from 1 to 3 days, during which up to 70% of total plasma volume invades body cavities, especially in the extremities. The most common clinical features are flu-like symptoms such as fatigue; runny nose; lightheadedness up to and including syncope (fainting); limb, abdominal or generalized pain; facial or other edema; dyspnea; and hypotension that results in circulatory shock and potentially in cardiopulmonary collapse and other organ distress or damage. Acute kidney injury or failure is a common risk due to acute tubular necrosis consequent to hypovolemia and rhabdomyolysis. The escape of fluid out of the capillaries has similar effects on the circulation as dehydration, slowing both the flow of oxygen delivered to tissues and organs as well as the output of urine, causing oliguria.

Urgent medical attention in this phase often features fluid resuscitation efforts, mainly the intravenous administration of saline solution plus hetastarch or albumin and colloids (to increase the remaining blood flow to vital organs like the kidneys), as well as glucocorticoids (steroids like methylprednisolone, to reduce or stop the capillary leak). However, the impact of such fluid therapy is always transient and leads to increased extravascular fluid accumulation, engendering multiple complications especially compartment syndrome and thus limb-destructive rhabdomyolysis.

Consequently, fluid resuscitation should be minimized as much as possible in patients experiencing episodes of SCLS, and they should be closely monitored in a hospital intensive-care setting including for orthopedic complications requiring surgical decompression. Clinical experience since 2015 suggests that administration of immunoglobulins (IVIG) with minimal additional intravenous fluids, close to the start of an episode of SCLS, is a safe way to support patients during their leak phase and is associated with rapid clinical improvement.

=== The recruitment phase ===
The second stage features the reabsorption of the initially extravasated fluid and albumin from the tissues, and it usually lasts 1 to 2 days. Intravascular fluid overload leads to polyuria and can cause flash pulmonary edema and cardiac arrest, with possibly fatal consequences. Death from SCLS typically occurs during this recruitment phase because of pulmonary edema arising from excessive intravenous fluid administration during the earlier leak phase. The severity of the problem depends on the quantity of fluid supplied in the initial phase, the damage that may have been sustained by the kidneys, and the promptness with which diuretics are administered to help the patient discharge the accumulated fluids quickly. A study published in 2017 of 59 acute episodes occurring in 37 hospitalized SCLS patients concluded that high-volume fluid therapy was independently associated with poorer clinical outcomes, and that the main complications of SCLS episodes were recovery-phase pulmonary edema (24%), cardiac arrhythmia (24%), compartment syndrome (20%), and acquired infections (19%).

The prevention of episodes of SCLS has involved two approaches. The earliest was advocated by the Mayo Clinic, and it recommended treatment with high doses of beta agonists such as terbutaline, phosphodiesterase-inhibitor theophylline, and leukotriene-receptor antagonists montelukast sodium.

The rationale for use of these drugs was their ability to increase intracellular cyclic AMP (adenosine monophosphate) levels, which might counteract inflammatory signaling pathways that induce endothelial permeability. It was the standard of care until the early 2000s, but was sidelined afterwards because patients frequently experienced renewed episodes of SCLS, and because these drugs were poorly tolerated due to their unpleasant side effects.

The second approach, pioneered in France during the early 2000s, involves monthly intravenous infusions of immunoglobulins (IVIG), with an initial dose of 1-2 gr/kg/month of body weight, which has proven very successful as per abundant case-report evidence from around the world.

IVIG has long been used for the treatment of autoimmune and MGUS-associated syndromes, because of its potential immunomodulatory and anticytokine properties. The precise mechanism of action of IVIG in patients with SCLS is unknown, but it is likely that it neutralizes their proinflammatory cytokines that provoke endothelial dysfunction.

A review of clinical experience with 69 mostly European SCLS patients found that preventive treatment with IVIG was the strongest factor associated with their survival, such that an IVIG therapy should be the first-line preventive agent for SCLS patients. According to an NIH survey of patient experience, IVIG prophylaxis is associated with a dramatic reduction in the occurrence of SCLS episodes in most patients, with minimal side effects, so it may be considered as frontline therapy for those with a clear-cut diagnosis of SCLS and a history of recurrent episodes.

A study published in 2022, to evaluate the safety of IVIG tapering and withdrawal in 59 French and Italian patients with SCLS, concluded that the incidence of severe flares was not statistically different across the different dosages of IVIG, but that withdrawal was associated with increased mortality and higher rates of recurrence, such that lifelong treatment with IVIG is recommended for patients with SCLS.

== Prognosis ==
In mostly European experience with 69 patients during 1996–2016, the 5- and 10-year survival rates for SCLS patients were 78% and 69%, respectively, but the survivors received significantly more frequent preventive treatment with IVIG than did non-survivors. Five- and 10-year survival rates in patients treated with IVIG were 91% and 77%, respectively, compared to 47% and 37% in patients not treated with IVIG. Moreover, better identification and management of this condition since 2016 appears to be resulting in lower mortality and improving survival and quality-of-life results.

== History ==
The syndrome was first described by a team of New York City physicians led by Dr. Bayard D. Clarkson in 1960, after whom it was later informally named. Beyond numerous case reports published since then, three comprehensive reviews of clinical and research experience were published in 2017, and a complete disease primer appeared in late 2024.
