= David A. Karnofsky =

American clinical oncologist

David Aryah Karnofsky
- Born: March 28, 1914; Los Angeles, California, US
- Died: August 31, 1969 (aged 55); Ellsworth, Maine, US
- Occupation(s): physician, medical oncologist
- Known for: Karnofsky score
- Spouse: Elesa Campbell Addis (m. 1943)

David Aryah Karnofsky (March 28, 1914 – August 31, 1969) was an American clinical oncologist. In 1940, while he was a resident at the Colis P. Huntington Memorial Laboratory for Cancer Research of Harvard University, David A. Karnofsky began clinical research in cancer, and devoted himself to this area throughout his career. He was an internationally recognized specialist in cancer chemotherapy and affiliated with the Division of Experimental Chemotherapy, Sloan-Kettering Institute for Cancer Research.

== Education and training ==
David graduated from Belmont High School (Los Angeles, California) (1930), UCLA 1934. He received his masters (A.M, 1936) in biology from Stanford University with a thesis entitled Some effects of thyroidectomy on the mammary glands and some other organs in the rat. He received his medical degree (Alpha Omega Alpha 1940), also from Stanford University. In the early years of his career at the Collis P. Huntington Memorial Laboratory at Harvard University, he became interested in clinical cancer research. This interest was further fueled by experiments he conducted during World War II as part of the Army Chemical Warfare Service.

== Medical oncologist ==
Karnofsky is considered one of the pioneer medical oncologists, devoting his 30-year career to the successful use of chemotherapeutic agents to treat cancer. In 1948 Karnofsky, together with Dr. Walter H. Abelmann, Dr. Lloyd F. Craver, and Dr. Joseph H. Burchenal (the latter also worked in the Sloan-Kettering Institute for Cancer Research), described the Karnofsky Performance Status Scale. The primary purpose of the development of the scale was to allow physicians to evaluate a patient's ability to survive chemotherapy for cancer in a more objective manner. The widely used Karnofsky score runs from 100 to 0, where 100 is "perfect" health and 0 is death. Practitioners occasionally assign performance scores in between standard intervals of 10.

== Karnofsky Memorial Lecture ==
When Karnofsky died of lung cancer in August 1969, a group of his friends donated a fund to be used to finance a yearly lecture at the annual meeting of the American Society of Clinical Oncology (ASCO). An obituary detailing his work was written by Joseph H. Burchenal.

== Literature ==
- Burchenal JH. Obituary: David A. Karnofsky. Cancer Res. 1970:30:549-550.
- Karnofsky DA and Burchenal JH. The clinical evaluation of chemotherapeutic agents in cancer. In: MacLeod CM (ed.) Evaluation of chemotherapeutic agents. New York: Columbia University Press, 1949, pp. 191–205.
- Timmermann, Carsten (2013). "'Just give me the best quality of life questionnaire': The Karnofsky scale and the history of quality of life measurements in cancer trials". Chronic Illness. 9 (3): 179–190. doi:10.1177/1742395312466903. PMC 3837542. PMID 23239756.
