= Pagetoid reticulosis =

- Other names: Woringer-Kolopp disease
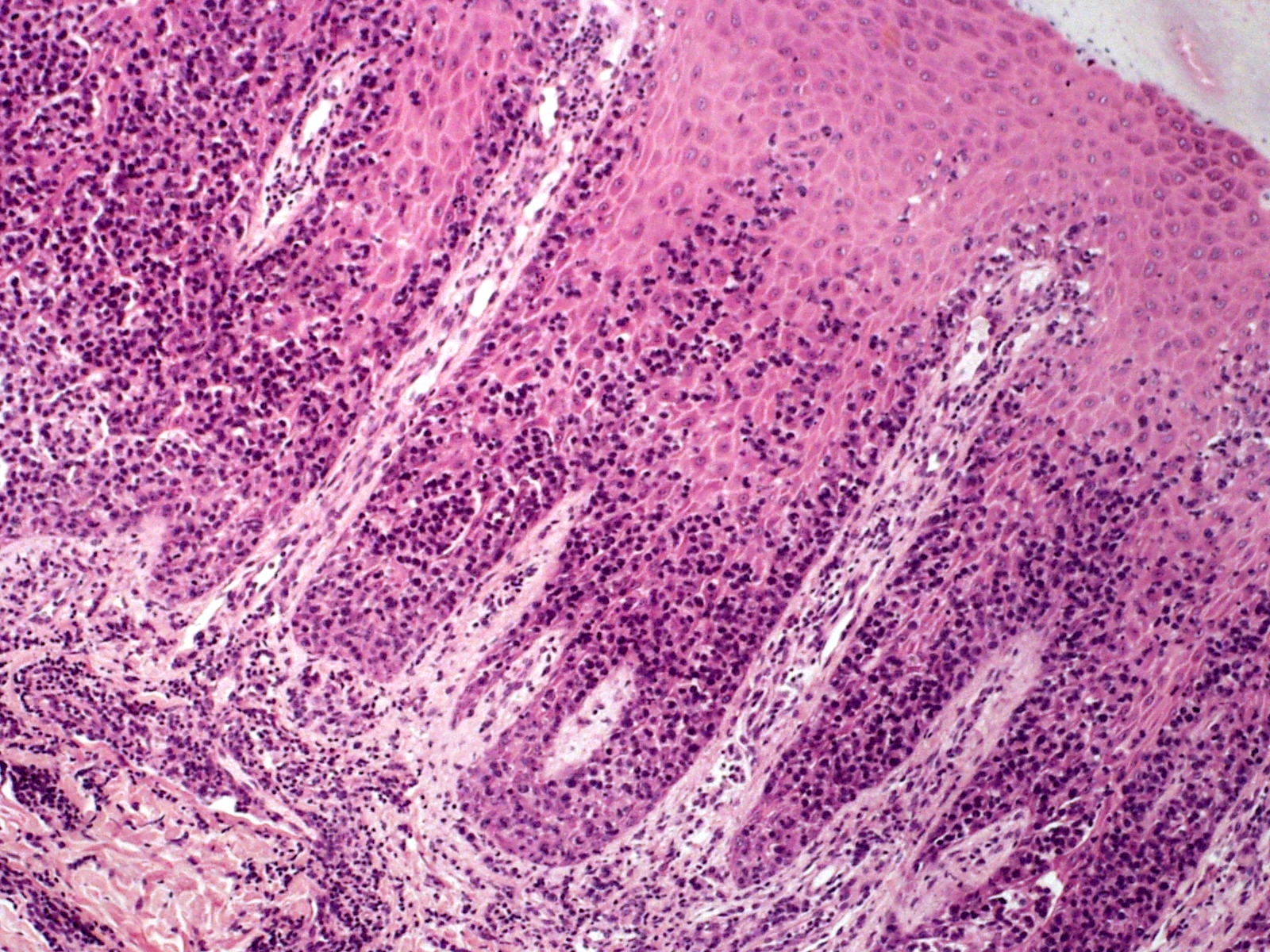
- Specialty: Dermatology

Pagetoid reticulosis (also known as "acral mycoses fungoides", "localized epidermotropic reticulosis", "mycosis fungoides palmaris et plantaris", "unilesional mycosis fungoides", and "Woringer–Kolopp disease") is a cutaneous condition, an uncommon lymphoproliferative disorder, sometimes considered a form of mycosis fungoides.

== Symptoms and signs ==
Lesions emerge as well-demarcated psoriasiform or hyperkeratotic patches and plaques, with a central clearing and an elevated border. Pagetoid reticulosis is a very slow progressive variant of mycosis fungoides and is usually localized unlike the latter.

== Treatment ==
The most common method of treatment includes radiotherapy and/or surgical excision.

== See also ==
- Pagetoid
- Cutaneous T-cell lymphoma
- List of cutaneous conditions
