= Cutaneous T-cell lymphoma =

Type of immune system cancer

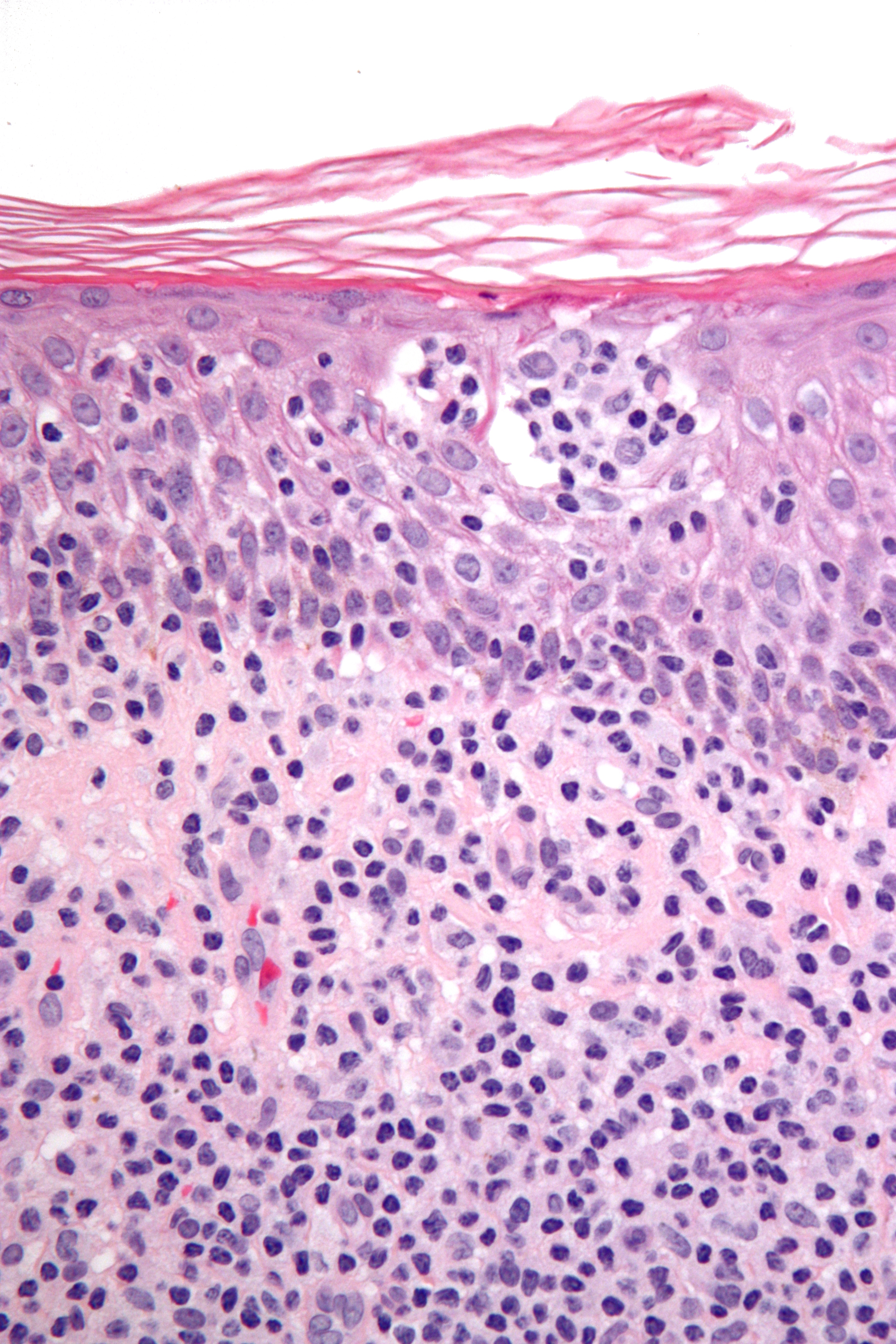
- Micrograph showing cutaneous T-cell lymphoma. H&E stain
- Specialty: Hematology and oncology
- Frequency: 0.03%

Cutaneous T-cell lymphoma (CTCL) is a class of non-Hodgkin lymphoma, which is a type of cancer of the immune system. Unlike most non-Hodgkin lymphomas (which are generally B-cell-related), CTCL is caused by a mutation of T cells. The cancerous T cells in the body initially migrate to the skin, causing various lesions to appear. These lesions change shape as the disease progresses, typically beginning as what appears to be a rash which can be very itchy and eventually forming plaques and tumors before spreading to other parts of the body.

== Signs and symptoms ==
The presentation depends if it is mycosis fungoides or Sézary syndrome, the most common, though not the only types. Among the symptoms for the aforementioned types are: enlarged lymph nodes, an enlarged liver and spleen, and non-specific dermatitis.

== Cause ==
The cause of CTCL remains largely unknown, but several external risk factors have been proposed as potential triggers and promoters of the disease. These include the use of hydrochlorothiazide diuretics, therapy-induced immunosuppression, and possible infections by a range of viral (e.g., HTLV-1, HTLV-2, HIV, Epstein-Barr virus, Cytomegalovirus, HHV-6, HHV-7, HHV-8 (KSHV), and Polyomaviruses such as Merkel cell polyomavirus) and bacterial or fungal pathogens (including Staphylococcus aureus, Mycobacterium leprae, Chlamydophila pneumoniae, and dermatophytes). The level of evidence varies among the different factors.

== Diagnosis ==
A point-based algorithm for the diagnosis for early forms of cutaneous T-cell lymphoma was proposed by the International Society for Cutaneous Lymphomas in 2005.

=== Classification ===
Cutaneous T-cell lymphoma may be divided into the several subtypes. Mycosis fungoides is the most common form of CTCL and is responsible for half of all cases. A WHO-EORTC classification has been developed.

- Pagetoid reticulosis
- Sézary syndrome
- Granulomatous slack skin
- Lymphomatoid papulosis
- Pityriasis lichenoides chronica
- Pityriasis lichenoides et varioliformis acuta
- CD30+ cutaneous T-cell lymphoma
- Secondary cutaneous CD30+ large cell lymphoma
- Non-mycosis fungoides CD30− cutaneous large T-cell lymphoma
- Pleomorphic T-cell lymphoma
- Lennert lymphoma
- Subcutaneous T-cell lymphoma
- Angiocentric lymphoma
- Blastic NK-cell lymphoma
- Primary cutaneous anaplastic large-cell lymphoma
- Primary cutaneous acral CD8 positive T cell lymphoproliferative disorder

== Treatment ==
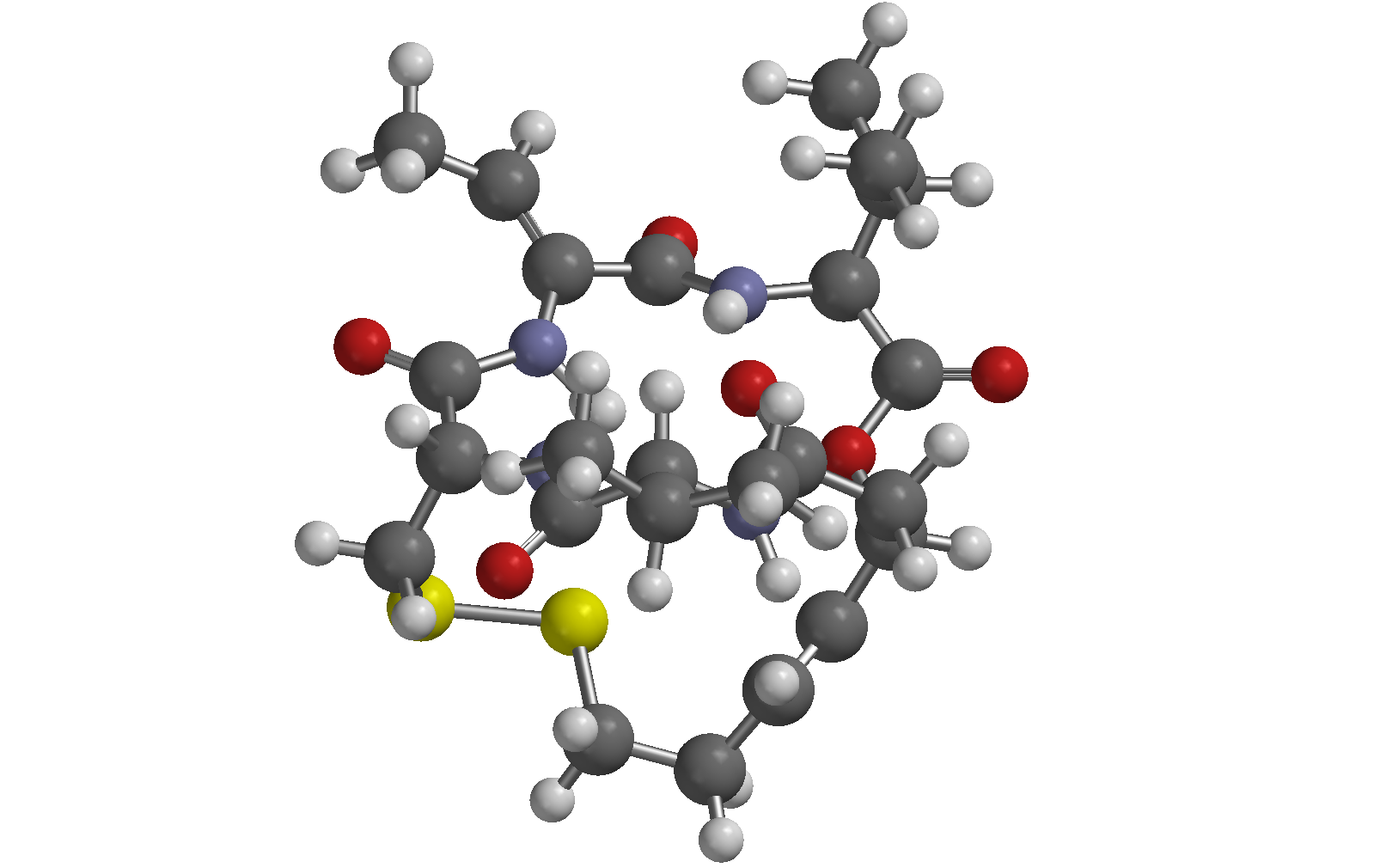
Romidepsin

There is no cure for CTCL, but there are a variety of treatment options available and some CTCL patients are able to live normal lives with this cancer, although symptoms can be debilitating and painful, even in earlier stages. FDA approved treatments include the following:

- (1999) Denileukin diftitox (Ontak - no longer available - replaced by Lymphir)
- (2000) Bexarotene (Targretin) a retinoid
- (2006) Vorinostat (Zolinza) a hydroxamate histone deacetylase (HDAC) inhibitor
- (2009) Romidepsin (Istodax) a cyclic peptide histone deacetylase (HDAC) inhibitor
- (2018) Poteligeo (mogamulizumab-kpkc)
- (2024) Lymphir (Denileukin diftitox-cxdl) an IL-2 receptor directed immunotoxin

Histone deacetylase (HDAC) inhibitors are shown to have antiproliferative and cytotoxic properties against CTCL. Other (off label) treatments include:

- Topical and oral corticosteroids
- Bexarotene (Targretin) gel and capsules
- Carmustine (BCNU, a nitrosourea)
- Mechlorethamine (nitrogen mustard)
- Phototherapy (broad and narrow band UVB or PUVA)
- Electron therapy
- Conventional radiation therapy
- Photopheresis
- Interferons
- Alemtuzumab (Campath-1H)
- Methotrexate
- Pentostatin and other purine analogues (Fludarabine, 2-deoxychloroadenosine)
- Liposomal doxorubicin (Doxil)
- Gemcitabine (Gemzar)
- Cyclophosphamide
- Bone marrow / stem cells
- Allogenic transplantation
- Forodesine (inhibits purine nucleoside phosphorylase)

In 2010, the U.S. Food and Drug Administration granted orphan drug designation for naloxone lotion as a treatment for pruritus in cutaneous T-cell lymphoma to a pharmaceutical company called Elorac.

== Epidemiology ==
Of all cancers involving lymphocytes, 2% of cases are cutaneous T cell lymphomas. CTCL is more common in men and in African-American people. The incidence of CTCL in men is 1.6 times higher than in women.

There is some evidence of a relationship with human T-lymphotropic virus (HTLV) with the adult T-cell leukemia/lymphoma subtype. No definitive link between any viral infection or environmental factor has been definitely shown with other CTCL subtypes.

== See also ==
- Cutaneous B-cell lymphoma
- List of cutaneous conditions
