= Primary cutaneous CD-30 positive T-cell lymphoproliferative disorders =

- Specialty: Dermatology

Primary cutaneous CD-30 positive T-cell lymphoproliferative disorders are a family of skin-localized extranodal lymphoid neoplasms that develop from mature postthymic T cells. Currently used classification schemes identify primary cutaneous anaplastic large cell lymphoma and lymphomatoid papulosis (LyP).

== See also ==
- Cutaneous T-cell lymphoma
- Secondary cutaneous CD30+ large cell lymphoma
- List of cutaneous conditions
