= Elizabeth Burchenal =

American folklorist

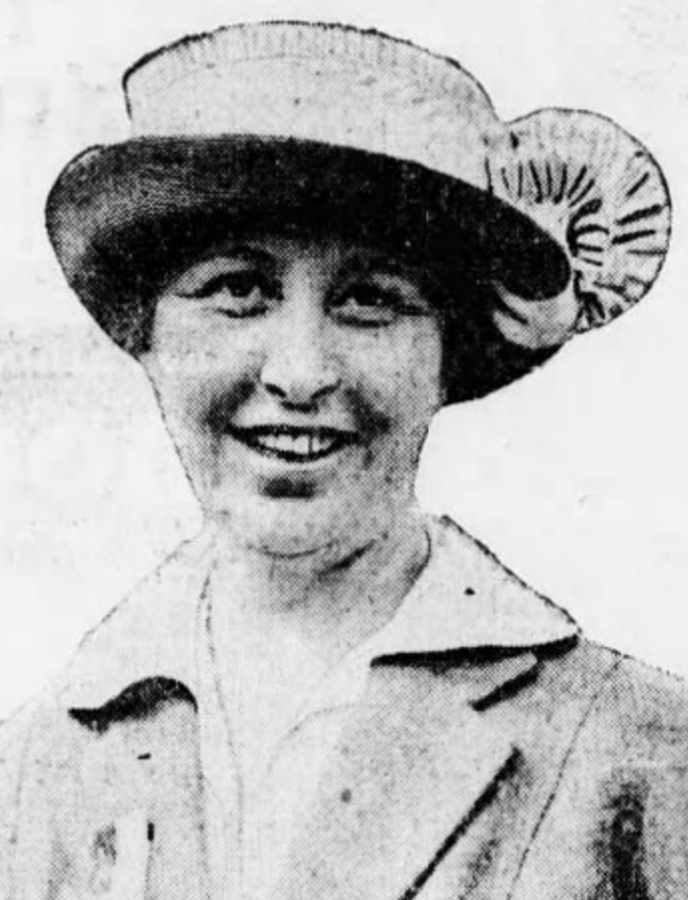
- Elizabeth Burchenal, from a 1915 newspaper
- Born: Flora Elizabeth Burchenal; October 1875; Richmond, Indiana, U.S.
- Died: November 21, 1959 (aged 84); Brooklyn, New York, U.S.
- Occupations: Folklorist, educator
- Known for: First president of the American Folk Dance Society (1916)

Flora Elizabeth Burchenal (October 1875 – November 21, 1959) was an American educator and the first president of the American Folk Dance Society when it was founded in 1916. Journalist Ida Tarbell described Burchenal as "one of the 50 living women who have done the most for the welfare of the United States."

== Early life and education ==
Burchenal was born in Richmond, Indiana, the daughter of Charles H. Burchenal and Mary Elizabeth Day Burchenal. Her father was a lawyer and a judge. She graduated from Earlham College in 1896, and pursued further studies at the Sargent School of Physical Education in Boston.

== Career ==
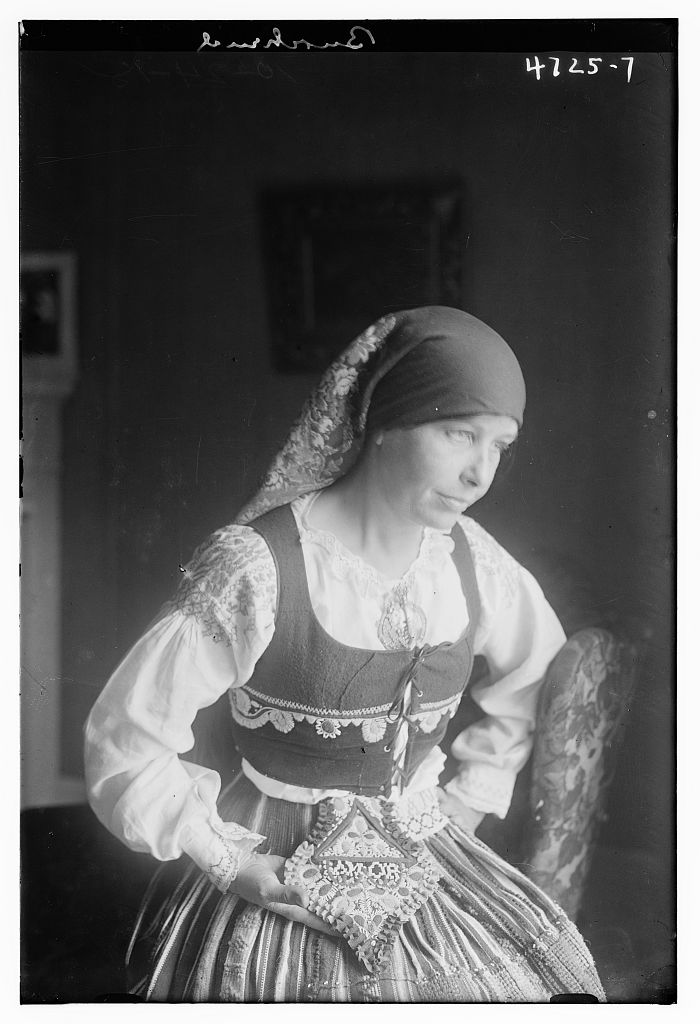
Elizabeth Burchenal in folk costume, from the Library of Congress

Burchenal taught physical education classes at Teachers College, Columbia University from 1903 to 1905. She was executive secretary of the Girls' Branch of the Public School Athletic League of New York from 1906 to 1916. In 1909, she was appointed by the New York City Department of Education as inspector of athletics, promoting and overseeing dance instruction in the city schools. She organized large folk dance festivals for the city's schoolchildren and adults, arranged dance music for recordings, and researched European folk dances with her sister, Emma Howells Burchenal. From 1916 to 1922, she was a "special national representative" of the War Workers Community Service.

In 1916, Burchenal was a founder and first president of the American Folk Dance Society. When the society became part of the National Committee of Folk Arts of the United States in 1929, she was its director and national chairman. With another sister, Ruth, she founded the Folk Arts Center of New York, an exhibit, library, and archive space. She was described as "easily the foremost exponent of the folk dance movement in the world" when she gave a silver cup for a trophy in a youth folk dance competition in 1927.

Burchenal was an American delegate to the International Commission of Popular Arts when it met in Prague in 1928, and in Belgium in 1930. From 1933 to 1934, she traveled in Germany studying folk dances. Boston University presented Burchenal with an honorary doctorate in 1943. She received the Gulick Award in 1950.

== Publications ==
- "Does Training in Dancing Contribute to General Grace of Carriage and Posture?" (1905)
- Folk Dance Music (1908, with C. Ward Crampton)
- Folk Dances and Singing Games (3 vol., 1909, 1922)
- "Athletics for Girls" (1909, with Jennie Bradley Roessing)
- Dances of the People (1913)
- Folk Dances of Denmark (1915)
- American Country Dances (1917)
- "A Constructive Program of Athletics for School Girls: Policy, Method and Activities" (1919)
- Folk-Dances from Old Homelands (1922)
- Folk-dancing as a Popular Recreation: A Handbook (1922)
- National Dances of Ireland (1925)
- Three Old American Quadrilles (1926)
- Four Folk Games from Sweden, Finland, Czechoslovakia (1928)
- Five Folk Dances (1929)
- Folk Dances of Germany (1938)
- "Folk Dances of the United States: Regional Types and Origins" (1951)

== Personal life ==
Burchenal died in 1959, probably in her eighties, in Brooklyn.
