= Eastern Cooperative Oncology Group =

Cancer organization in Philadelphia, United States

The Eastern Cooperative Oncology Group (ECOG) began in 1955 as one of the first publicly funded cooperative groups to perform multi-center clinical trials for cancer research. A cooperative group in oncology constitutes a large network of private and public medical institutions developing protocols for cancer treatments. Institutional members include universities, medical centers, governments, and other cooperative groups. Research results are often provided through scientific publications, but the group also works closely with the pharmaceutical industry to test potential cancer drugs.

Eastern Cooperative Oncology Group

According to ECOG's website, there are "more than 90 active clinical trials in all types of adult malignancies. Annual accrual is 6,000 patients, with more than 20,000 patients in follow-up."

ECOG's coordinating center is based in Boston, Massachusetts while its Group Chair's office is located in Philadelphia, Pennsylvania.
