= Joseph H. Burchenal =

American oncologist

Joseph Holland Burchenal (December 21, 1912 – March 8, 2006) was an American oncologist, and a winner of the 1972 Albert Lasker Award for Medical Research for his work on developing a chemotherapy for Burkitt's lymphoma. His research with George Hitchings and Gertrude Elion led to the creation of the leukemia treatment mercaptopurine. He worked at Memorial Sloan Kettering Cancer Center and was a member of the presidential panel that initiated the U.S. federal government's war on cancer. Burchenal died in Hanover, New Hampshire on March 8, 2006. He was 93 years old.

== See also ==
- Elizabeth Burchenal, authority on American folk dance
