= Celalettin Muhtar Ozden =

Turkish dermatologist

Celalettin Muhtar Özden
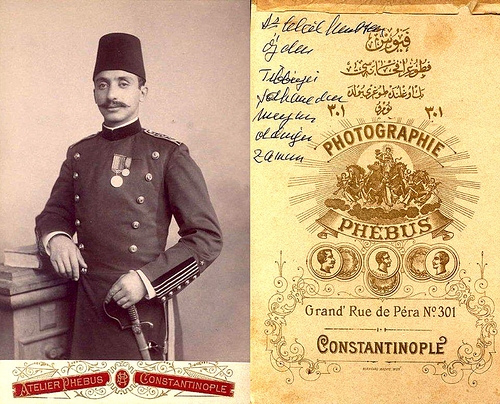
- Born: Celalettin Muhtar; August 1865; Istanbul
- Died: 26 October 1947 (aged 82); Istanbul
- Occupation: dermatologist
- Known for: dermatophytes

Celalettin Muhtar "Celal" Özden (August 1865 – 26 October 1947) was a Turkish dermatologist known for his work on dermatophytes. Often known as 'Djèlaleddin Moukhtar' in Europe, he served as a prominent military and civilian physician and a medical scholar in the last decades of the Ottoman Empire and the early history of Turkey.

== Early life and education ==
Özden as born in Istanbul in August 1865. to parents Mehmet and Emine Muhtar. His father, Mehmet, was the head clerk and literary teacher at the Ottoman Military Medical School. Celalettin Muhtar, shortly Celal, was the elder brother of doctors Akil Muhtar Özden, who served for a while as doctor to Mustafa Kemal Atatürk and later as a member of the Turkish Parliament, and Kemal Muhtar Özden.

Muhtar began his education at Fıstıklı School in Üsküdar, Istanbul and continued his studies at Galatasaray High School. He completed his medical education between 1881 and 1887 at the Military Medical School. He then studied rabies and methods of bacteriology as an assistant of Dr. Zoiros Pasha for two years until 1889. He made an effort to prepare a rabies vaccine, working with rabbits on Rabbit Island. He was then selected to go to Europe with Cenap Şahabettin by the Military Medical School. In 1889, he was sent to Hôpital Saint-Louis in Paris to carry out his studies on skin and syphilitic diseases and worked with famous dermatologists such as Jean Alfred Fournier, Émile Vidal, Ferdinand-Jean Darier, Ernest Besnier, and François Henri Hallopeau.

== Life and work ==
Muhtar continued to live in Paris for the next four years. He participated in the First International Congress of Dermatology held in Paris from 5–10 August 1889. In this congress, various dermatological diseases such as lichen, pityriasis rubra pilaris, pemphigus, trichophytosis, syphilis, and leprosy were discussed, and Muhtar presented a paper on syphilitic chancre without lymphadenopathy. Muhtar studied histology in Louis-Charles Malassez's laboratory and pathological anatomy in Hôpital de la Charité from P.C.E. Potain's laboratory chef, Suchard. After he began to work in the newly opened Pasteur Institute in 1890, he attended courses there. Muhtar was the first Turkish dermatologist who studied at the institute. He was added as correspondent member to the French Society of Dermatology and Syphilography on 10 March 1892.

In August 1892, Muhtar returned to Istanbul. When he returned to the Military Medical School, Dr. Ernst von Dühring (1858–1944) had been working as a lecturer in the dermatology department. Muhtar also began to work as a lecturer in this department alongside von Dühring until 1902, when von Dühring returned to Kiel and Muhtar became the chief of the clinic.

Muhtar was a prominent lecturer for his students as well as physicians for 32 years, lecturing on skin diseases and syphilis. He educated famous Turkish dermatologists such as Hüseyinzade Ali Turan (1864–1941), Ali Rıza Atasoy (1875–1951), Şükrü Mehmet Sekban (1881–1960), and Hasan Reşat Sığındım (1889–1971). Many articles have been published about his work, giving him an international reputation, especially about syphilis. He identified a form of trichophytosis on the palms and soles, also known as palmar and plantar trichophytosis (Trichophyties palmaire et plantaire).

In addition to his scholarly contribution to medicine, Muhtar joined the board of directors of the Turkish Red Crescent in April 1911 and also worked as a general inspector for the institution. Much of his work in the Red Crescent was during World War I that began a few years later and the subsequent Turkish War of Independence. Despite the difficulties of war, he increased physical force of the Red Crescent and built warehouses to defend goods brought into Anatolia. With Muhtar's efforts, the Red Crescent provided for the needs for emigrants during the war in the Balkans.

After the establishment in 1917 of the Ottoman National Credit Bank (which was later to merge with İş Bankası in 1927), Muhtar served as the bank's acting manager for several years. He then served as a government bureaucrat for a short while, responsible for social services.

After the Surname Law in Turkey in 1934, Muhtar, along with his brothers Akil and Kemal, took on the surname "Özden." During the last years of life, his vision gradually worsened despite treatments in Paris and Geneva. In spite of visual loss, his interest in science remained, and he spent his last years listening to medical publications being read to him.

Celal Muhtar Özden died on 26 October 1947.
