= Safiye Elbi =

First professional nurse of the Republic of Turkey

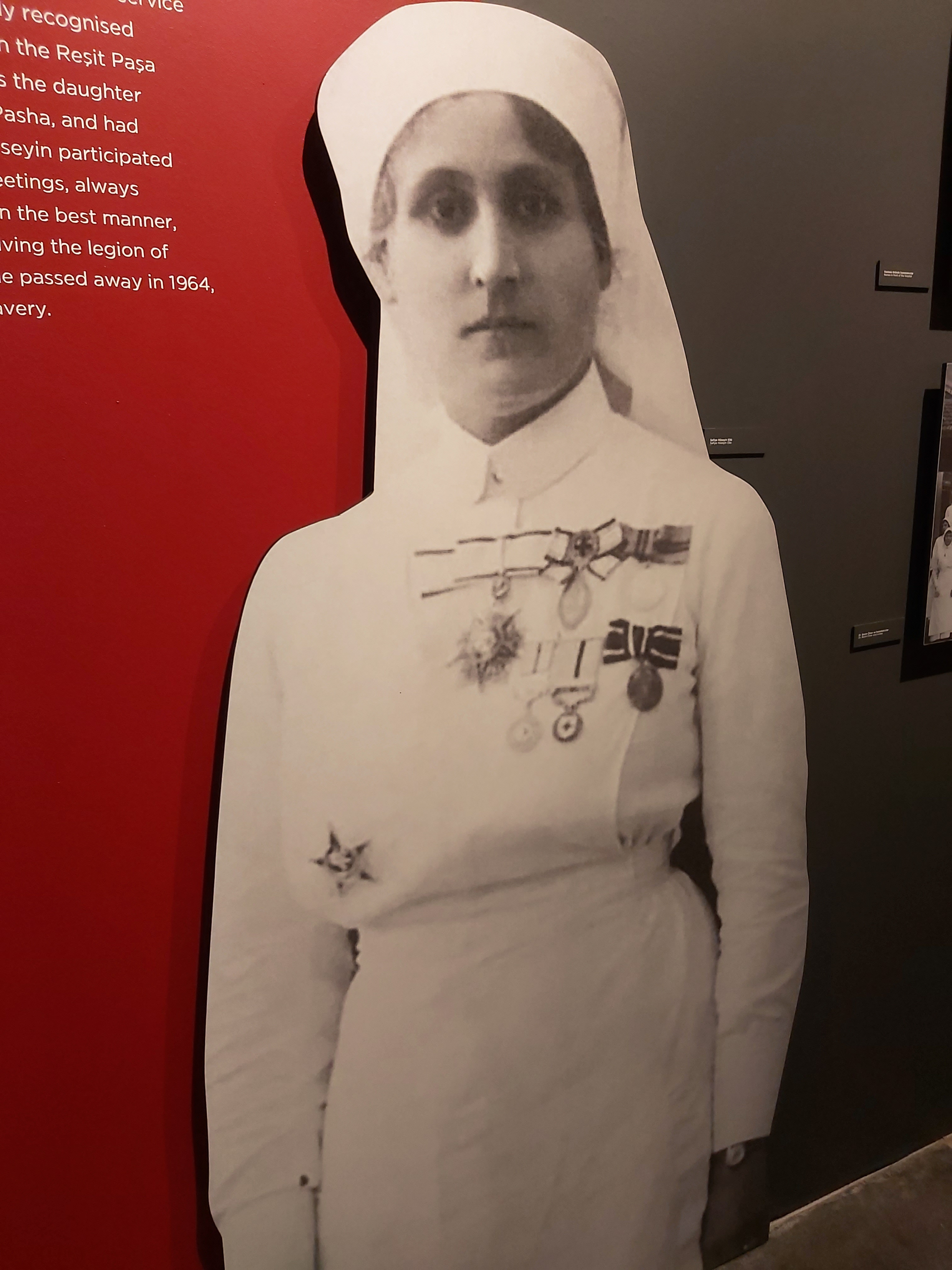
- Born: 29 June 1882; Constantinople, Ottoman Empire (now Istanbul, Turkey)
- Died: 6 July 1964 (aged 82); Istanbul, Turkey
- Occupations: Nurse who worked in: Âsar-ı Atika Museum Temporary Hospital; Red Crescent Galata and Cağaloğlu Hospitals; Reşitpaşa Hospital Ship; Kızılay Nursing School
- Spouse: Hüseyin Bey
- Children: Fatma Nahide; Tarık
- Awards: Florence Nightingale Medal; British Red Cross Medal; Order of Compassion 2nd Rank; General War Medal; Lapland Red Cross Order 1st Rank; French Red Cross Medal

Safiye (Hüseyin) Elbi (29 June 1882 – 6 July 1964) was a Turkish nurse, generally referred to as the first professional nurse of Turkey.

She was a professional nurse who contributed to the development of modern nursing in Turkey. She worked as a volunteer nurse during the Balkan Wars and World War I. After the proclamation of the Republic in Turkey, she took charge in many charities and associations. She advocated for women to participate in social life. She worked as an administrator and teacher at the Red Crescent Nursing School, which was established in Istanbul in 1925.

== Life ==
Elbi was born on 29 June 1882 in Istanbul. Her father was Ferik Amet Besim Pasha, chief engineer of the Tersane-i Âmire, one of the pioneers of mechanical engineering in Turkey. Her mother was Hannah Jane Milward Castell. The daughter of Englishman Andrew Castell, who converted to Islam and took the name Hasan Bey after a career in the navy and the Tersane-i Âmire. Following her marriage, Hannah Jane adopted the name Firdevs as a Muslim.

She studied at British and German girls' schools. She married a Marine Lieutenant Colonel Hüseyin Bey; She had two children, Fatma Nahide and Tarık.

During the Balkan Wars, when the Red Crescent Society invited women from Istanbul to take care of the wounded soldiers, she applied with her sister Nesime Mukadder (Dölen). The two sisters took part in the establishment of hospitals by collecting bedding and quilts as donations for a while. At that time, the Asar-ı Atika Museum was turned into a temporary hospital and allocated to the British Red Cross, where the medical team from England treated the war-wounded in the building known as the "Museum Hospital". Safiye Elbi and her sister were sent to the Museum Hospital after a while because they knew English well. Elbi started her nursing career in this hospital. Museum director Halil Edhem Eldem allocated his lodging to the two sisters during his duties.

After the temporary hospitals were closed, Safiye Hüseyin tried to improve her nursing knowledge by reading anatomy books. She attended the patient care courses organized by the Turkish Red Crescent Society in the university conference hall between 1913 and 1914. She helped the head of the society, Besim Ömer Akalin, in directing the women of Istanbul to volunteer nursing.

During World War I, she worked as a volunteer nurse at Hilal-i Ahmer Galata and Cağaloğlu Hospitals. Elbi specialized in common tetanus and gangrene diseases. Afterwards, she was assigned to Istanbul Girls High School, where the Red Crescent Hospital was built during the war. Later, she started to work on the Reşit Paşa Hospital Ship, which transported the seriously injured from Çanakkale to Istanbul by ferry. German and Austrian nurses worked on the ship. Safiye Hanım served as the only Turkish nurse and head nurse on the hospital ship.

At the end of the war, she was sent to Europe with Münire İsmail Hanım by the Red Crescent Society to examine the situation of Turkish prisoners and students in various European countries, to determine their needs and to carry out the necessary studies. Elbi travelled to Europe via the Korkovoda Ferry, which was carrying German and Austrian captives who were repatriated to their homeland. During this duty, she collected donations for the Red Crescent Society and traveled around the places where the students were, and ensured that all students in Berlin were sent to the dormitories by ship.

When she returned to Istanbul, she took part in the management committee of the newly established Himaye-i Etfal Society. She took part in the administrative committee and education staff of the Red Crescent Nursing School, which the society decided to establish in 1924 and opened in Istanbul in 1925. Elbi conducted the French lessons and took care of the deficiencies of the school.

Safiye Hanım, who participated in congresses in Germany and Switzerland, represented Turkey at the International Nurses Congress held in Geneva in 1923 and 1924. She gave conferences in the cities of Geneva, Paris, New York and Chicago on nursing and anti-drinking. Participated in talks about women. She worked with the humanitarian organization Save the Children and became the inspector of the institution.

As the first female member of the Red Crescent Society, she took part in the administrative committee. She was also among the founding members of the Tuberculosis Fighting Association and the Women's People Party.

In the municipal elections of 1930, when women used their right to vote and be elected for the first time in Turkey, she participated in the municipal council elections as a candidate for the Republican People's Party in Istanbul and entered the parliament.

In 1933, she took part in the establishment of the Turkish Nurses Association and served as the society's president.

She died in Gureba Hospital on 6 July 1964.
