= Akil Muhtar Özden =

Turkish physician (1877–1949)

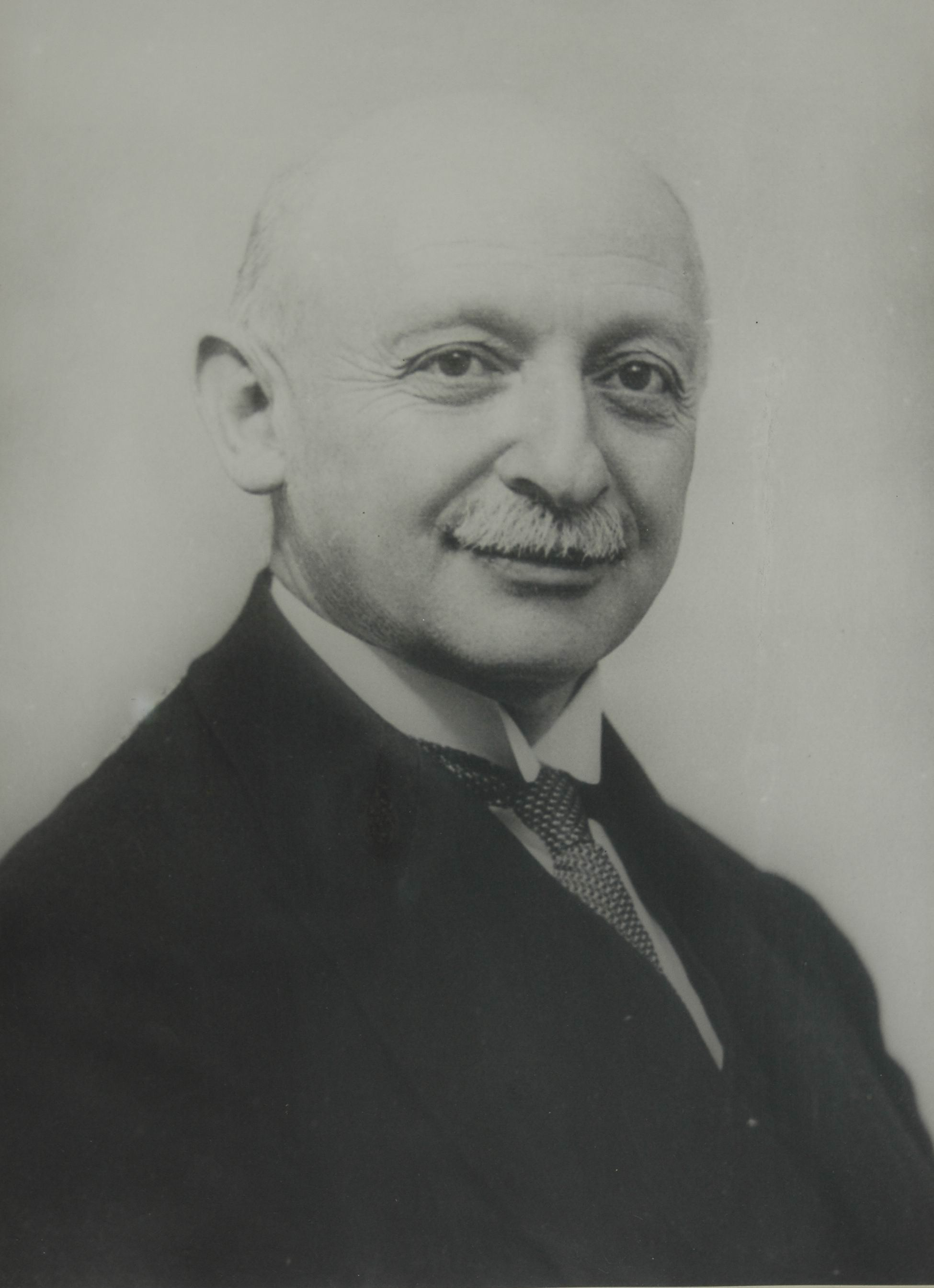

Personal details
- Born: 1 October 1877 Istanbul, Ottoman Empire
- Died: 12 March 1949 (aged 71) Çemberlitaş, Turkey
- Party: Republican People's Party

Akil Muhtar Özden (1877–1949), was a Turkish physician known for being the pioneer of experimental pharmacology in Turkey. He was educated at the Medical School of Geneva, whereupon graduation worked at the Pasteur Institute in Paris and prepared a doctoral thesis on ‘‘Long Lasting Cerebrospinal Meningitis’. He carried out research on ‘chloralose’ and 'opium alkaloids’. In 1909, he was appointed to the Civil Medical School of Istanbul as a lecturer and embarked on a long career of medical teaching until his retirement in 1943. After his retirement, Özden continued working in the medical field and had a short stint as a senator in the parliament.

== Biography ==
=== Early life and education ===
Akil Muhtar Özden was born in Cağaloğlu, Istanbul on 1 October 1877. His father, Mehmet Muhtar Efendi, was among the founders of the Turkish Medical Academy. He followed in the footsteps of his two elder brothers and entered the Military High School of Medicine after completing his secondary education. Upon receiving his graduation certificate from the Military High school of Medicine, he attended the Military College of Medicine (Mekteb-i Tıbbiye-i Askeriye) in Demirkapı for one year. In those years, the Military College of Medicine was known for harboring an environment that opposed the oppressive government of Sultan Abdulhamit and was a place of assembly for those who supported the idea of a national parliament. Due to the brewing political turmoil, having a good education was getting difficult for students due to insufficient education and research opportunities. During this process, Özden decided to flee to Switzerland in October 1896 and began his education at the Geneva Faculty of Medicine.

Akil Muhtar frequently traveled to France to take lectures from renowned medicine professors in Parisian hospitals such as Georges-Fernand Widal, Anatole Chauffard, and Joseph Jules Dejerine. He finished his medical education in 1902, went to the Pasteur Institute in Paris for a year, and then returned to Geneva in 1903. He worked as an assistant intern for half a year next to Louis Bard, a professor of internal medicine. He then earned the title of doctor of medicine by presenting his thesis titled “Contribution á l'étude de la Méningite Cérébrospinale á Forme Prolongée” which translates into “Contribution to Examinations in Long-lasting Cerebrospinal Meningitis”. Afterward, Akil Muhtar became a polyclinic assistant next to Prof. Dr. Mayor and served as an honorary assistant next to Prof. Dr. Cristiani. He became associate professor of Pharmacodynamics Privat in 1906 and taught practical pharmacology and medical curriculum courses between 1907 and 1908. Meanwhile, he published his studies on chloralose and opium alkaloids.

When Sultan Abdülhamit was deposed in 1909, he returned to his country. In 1914, when Tevfik Vacit Pasha was dismissed from the Haydarpasa Faculty of Medicine staff, Akil Muhtar was appointed to the post as the professor. In 1916, he was elected to replace Nuri Pasha and became the dean of the faculty.

The years between 1916 and 1921 were the most critical and dark periods for the faculty. Almost all of the assistants and professors were drafted into the military. During his deanship, he tried not to disrupt the education of his students and the treatment of patients. Amidst the occupation of Istanbul by the Allied forces, the Faculty of Medicine implemented a successful policy to prevent them from closing.

=== Later years and death ===
From 1908 to August 1943, Akil Muhtar Özden worked as a pharmacology professor for 37 years and retired due to old age. When he retired, he worked as a chief physician and internal medicine specialist at the German Hospital. In 1946, he was elected as a member of the Grand National Assembly of Turkey from the Republican People's Party.

As one of the founders of the Turkish History of Medicine Society, he had an active role in the society and was selected the president between 1940 and his death in 1949. He was also president of the Balkanic Union Medical Society and made valuable contributions to the Turkish Red Crescent Society.

Following World War II, Akil Muhtar Özden went to Switzerland towards the end of 1947 but fell ill there. The onset of his disease was somewhat hidden and slowly progressed, he self-diagnosed himself with “mediastinal lymphoma” and even determined the treatment method himself. Although he was bed sick at home for more than a year, he continued to read and work. He died at the age of 72 in his home in Çemberlitaş on the morning of March 12, 1949. 14 March 1949 Medicine Day coincided with the day of Akil Muhtar Özden's funeral. After the funeral prayer was performed in Bayezid Mosque, all the medical students who attended the Medicine Day brought the funeral to the university, and after a ceremony attended by the public here, the funeral was brought to Rumeli Hisar by ferry and buried next to his mother. He was later transferred to Edirnekapı Martyr's Cemetery.

=== Marriage and views on women's entry to the faculty of medicine ===
Akil Muhtar Özden married Nina Zuraboune Odiflelica (of Georgian descent) in 1908. Nina was a colleague of Akil Muhtar and earned her title of doctor of medicine in 1908, shortly before marrying Özden. She specialized in gynecology at the University of Geneva, then went to Paris to work on pediatrics. After her husband returned to his homeland in 1909, Nina, later on, moved to Istanbul to live with him. Working as a gynecologist in Istanbul, she had little luck in building a career and had consultations with her husband's close colleague, Besim Ömer Akalın for future opportunities. Besim Ömer Akalın suggested that she work in the Kadırga Delivery Room, but Özden did not want his wife to work under the conditions of that day. Nina converted to Islam in 1925 and took the name "Seniye", the name of Akil Muhtar Özden's aunt. She died on 21 March 1941, at the age of 62.

According to Prof. Dr. Fahrettin Kerim Gökay, Akil Muhtar Özden was “spiritually conservative” and was against the admission of women into medical school at the time he was dean. There was a headline of a news clipping found in the Archive of Deontology and History of Medicine of Istanbul University Faculty of Medicine about Akil Muhtar Özden and his views on the matter. The news headline was as follows: "As Long as I'm Dean, Girls Can't Enter Here."

== Contributions to medicine ==
=== Works about chloralose ===
Chloralose is a substance obtained by combining chloral hydrate and glucose. His work on chloralose passed into world literature while he was Prof. Dr. Mayor's assistant. It is in French and has 14 pages in total. Akil Muhtar, with the studies of chloralose, has shown that anesthetized animals are less sensitive to pain, whereas sensitivity to mechanical excitations increases.

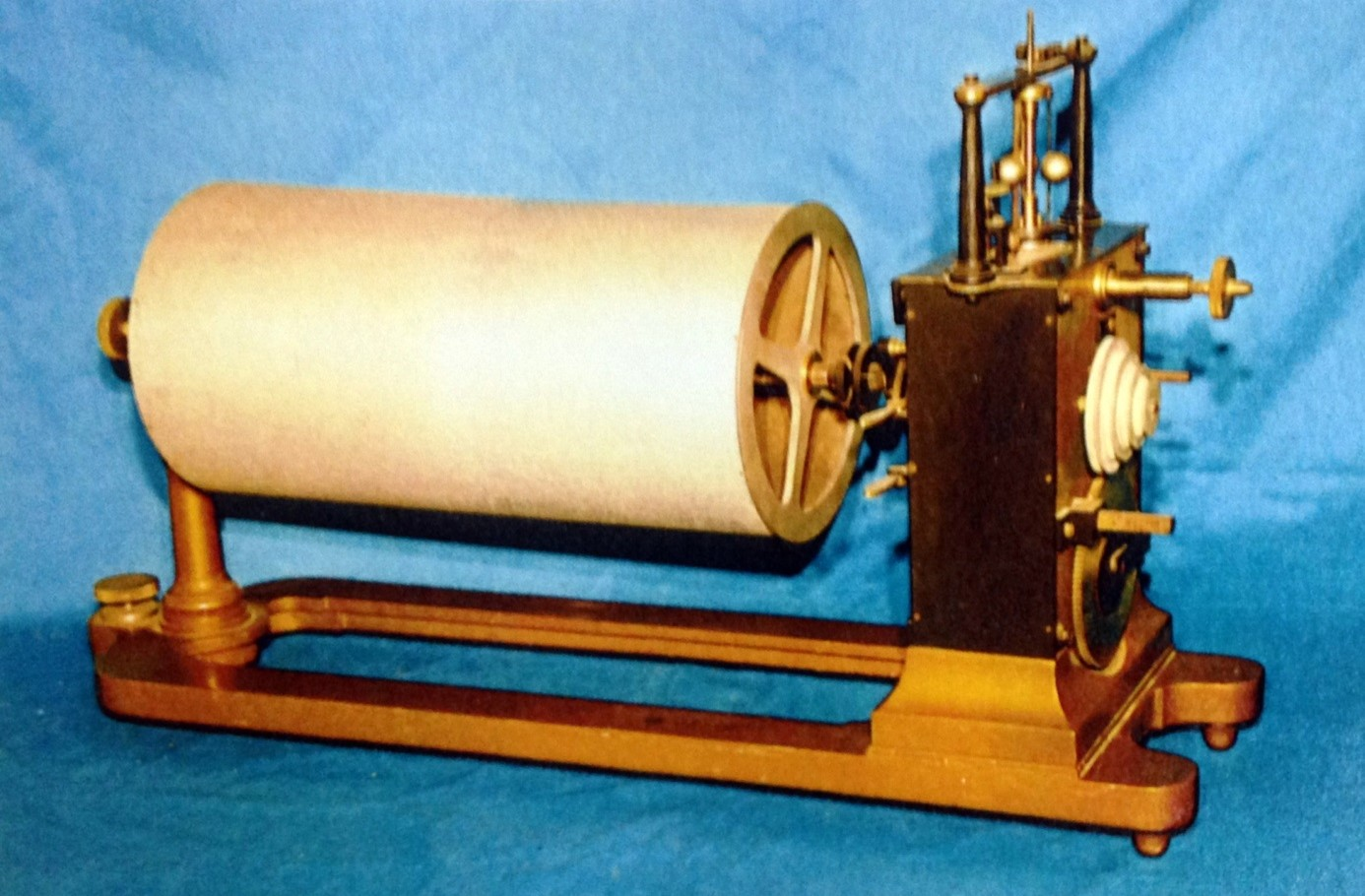
A horizontal Kymograph used by Özden between 1930 and 1935

=== Muhtar reflex ===
In 1909, Akil Muhtar conducted animal experiments to search for the local anesthetic effects of opium alkaloids; and during his research, he found a method for measuring the effects of local anesthetics, which later was called by his name: The Muhtar reflex. He had observed that when touched by a needle, the superficial muscles under and around the skin at the stimulated site contracted and that a general backward pull was noticed. When a diluted local anesthetic like cocaine or procaine was injected at the site, no contraction occurred due to the anesthetic effect of the drugs. When the anesthetic effect was weakened and lost by time, contraction upon stimulation occurred again. The time interval between the loss and the recurrence of the reflex pointed to the activity period of the anesthetic drug. Thus he was able to determine the activity periods and the relative strengths of various local anesthetics by this method. For this innovation, he was endowed with the Turkish Scientific and Technical Research Organization's Award in 1973.

=== Determination of liver insufficiency with santonin ===
To measure the detoxifying function of the liver, Özden created an experiment, using a colorimeter that he designed. Santonin is an alkaloid substance obtained from the plant artemisia cina and is not absorbed from the intestines because it does not dissolve in water, but is absorbed after it becomes soluble in a very small amount of alkaline environment. Absorbed santonin is rapidly converted into oxy-santonin in the liver, and oxysantonin stains the urine yellow. The color of urine dyed yellow changes to red with the help of kalevis. By using the amount of oxy-santonin, which is excreted in the urine and turns red with the help of alkalis, colorimetric measurements are made to measure how much the liver can perform its detoxification function. Akil Muhtar showed with these studies that the amount of oxy-santonin excreted is different in liver patients and healthy people. He published his findings in 1933. The method was used widely in France and Germany and was accepted as one of the best liver function tests until 1955.

== Published works and international recognition ==
In 1951, Prof. Dr. Bedii Şehsuvaroğlu published “The Bibliography of Dr. Akil Muhtar Özden” and the number of publications of Özden was reported as 264. In his classification, Şehsuvaroğlu divided 207 as medicine, 45 as paramedical, and 12 as the history of sciences. In the medical series, 109 are classified under internal diseases and treatment, 62 are pharmacodynamics, and 36 are the history of medicine and biography. While 3 of these publications were in Geneva, the rest were published after he came to Turkey. Most of his publications were in Turkish, while 41 were in Turkish-French, 1 in old Turkish-German, and 1 in French-Bulgarian. Among the Turkish articles, 35 of them are abbreviated translations and summaries, apart from research, facts, and instructive articles. His book, "Ethics in Terms of Science", which is considered to be his most valuable work in the paramedical field, is 200 pages long.

- (1909) Etude expérimentale de l'état de réflectivité exagérée déterminé par le chloralose, Geneva

== See also ==
- Celalettin Muhtar Ozden
