= Émile Vidal =

French dermatologist (1825–1893)

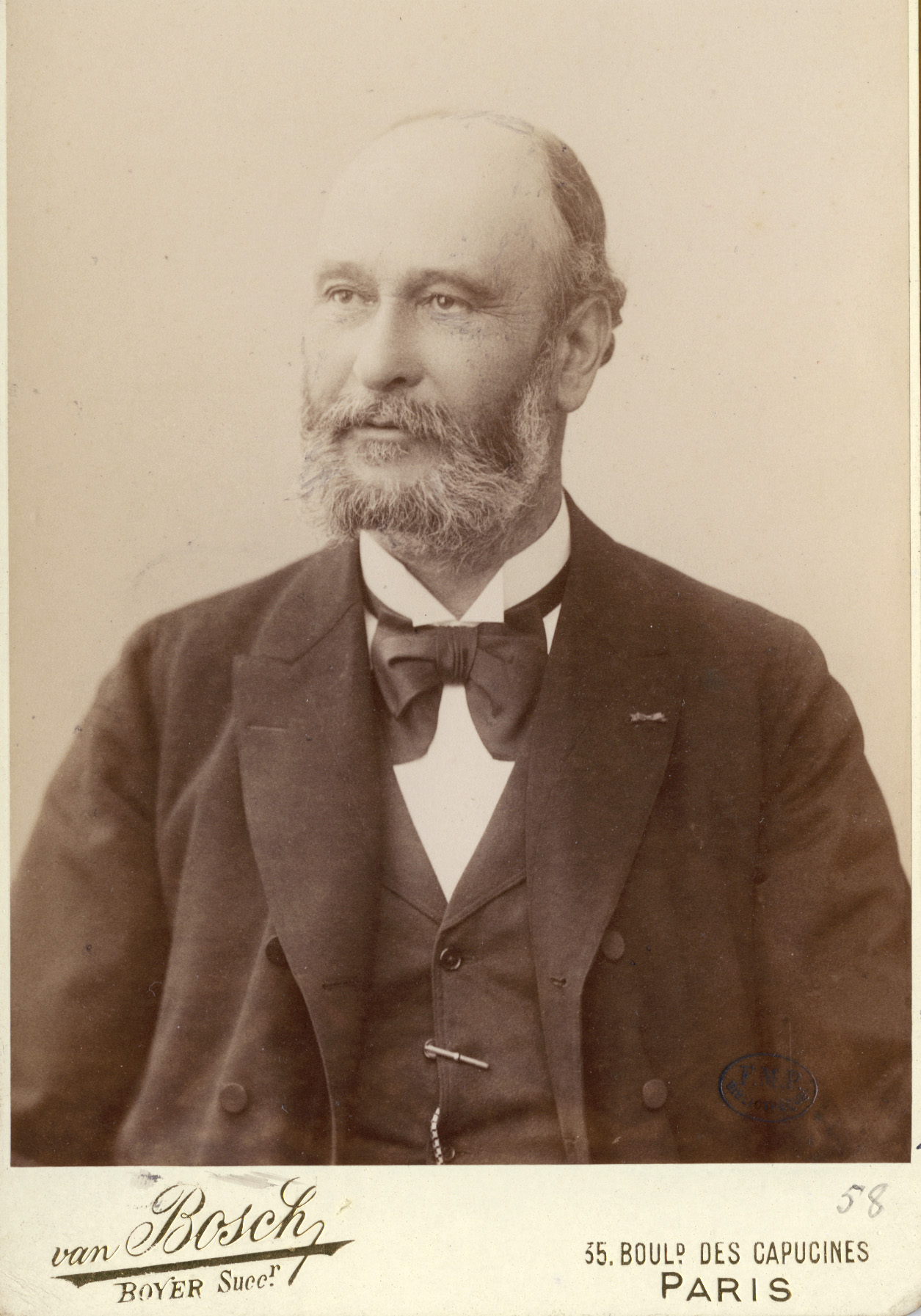

Jean Baptiste Émile Vidal (18 June 1825 – 16 June 1893) was a French dermatologist who was a native of Paris.

He studied medicine in Tours and Paris, becoming médecin des hôpitaux in 1862. For much of his career he was associated with the Hôpital Saint-Louis (1867–1890) in Paris. In 1883 he became a member of the Académie de Médecine.

In 1893, Vidal was the first to recognize and define the transmission of herpes simplex virus from one person to another.

He is remembered for his investigations of lupus and skin lichenification. His name is associated with "pityriasis circinata et marginata of Vidal", a disorder that is synonymous to pityriasis rosea, and "Vidal's disease", an historical name for lichen simplex chronicus.

== Publications ==
- Considérations sur le rhumatisme articulaire chronique primitif, 1855
- Du Pityriasis, 1877
- Inoculabilité de quelques affections cutanées, 1877
- Du pityriasis circiné et marginé, 1882
- Étude sur le mycosis fongoïde with L .Brocq, Paris : A. Delahaye et E. Lecrosnier, 1885
- Acne molluscum contagiosum" généralisée ; acné varioliforme (de Bazin) généralisée, 1889.
