= Molluscum dermatitis =

- Specialty: Dermatology

Molluscum dermatitis represents a unique form of id reaction, in which patients may present with localized or widespread eczema surrounding scattered lesions of molluscum contagiosum.

== See also ==
- Skin lesion
