= Dyshidrosis =

Inflammatory disease of the skin in humans

- Other names: Recurrent vesicular palmoplantar dermatitis (RVPD), acute vesiculobullous hand eczema, dyshidrotic dermatitis, dyshidrotic eczema, pompholyx, (Note: The name pompholyx derives from the ancient Greek word πομφόλυξ, "bubble". The related names cheiropompholyx and podopompholyx refer to the condition when present on the hands and feet respectively, and derive from the ancient Greek words χείρ, "hand", and πούς, "foot".) cheiropompholyx, podopompholyx
- The characteristic vesicles of dyshidrosis on a finger
- Pronunciation: /ˌdɪshaɪˈdroʊsɪs/
- Specialty: Dermatology
- Symptoms: Itchy blisters on the palms of the hands, sides of fingers, or bottoms of the feet
- Complications: skin thickening
- Usual onset: Often recurrent
- Duration: Heal over 3 weeks
- Causes: Unknown
- Diagnostic method: Based on symptoms
- Differential diagnosis: Pustular psoriasis, scabies
- Treatment: Avoiding triggers, barrier cream, steroid cream, antihistamines
- Frequency: 1-3% of population

Dyshidrosis is a type of dermatitis, characterized by itchy vesicles of 1–2 mm in size, on the palms of the hands, sides of fingers, or bottoms of the feet. Outbreaks usually conclude within three to four weeks, but often recur. Repeated attacks may result in fissures and skin thickening. The cause of the condition is not known.

== Symptoms ==
The characteristics of dyshidrosis are itchiness of the palms or soles, followed by the sudden development of intensely itchy small vesicles on the sides of the fingers, the palms or the feet, sometimes described as having a "tapioca pudding" appearance. The vesicles may develop in waves. After a few weeks, the top layer of skin may fall off and inflammation appear around the bases of the vesicles, and there may be peeling, rings of scale, or lichenification. After three to four weeks the vesicles will disappear. While they are present there is a risk of secondary bacterial infection. The locations of the eruption may be symmetrical on the body, and redness is not usually present.

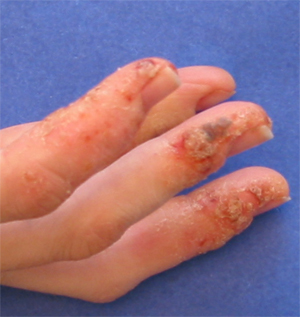
Advanced stage of dyshidrosis on the fingers

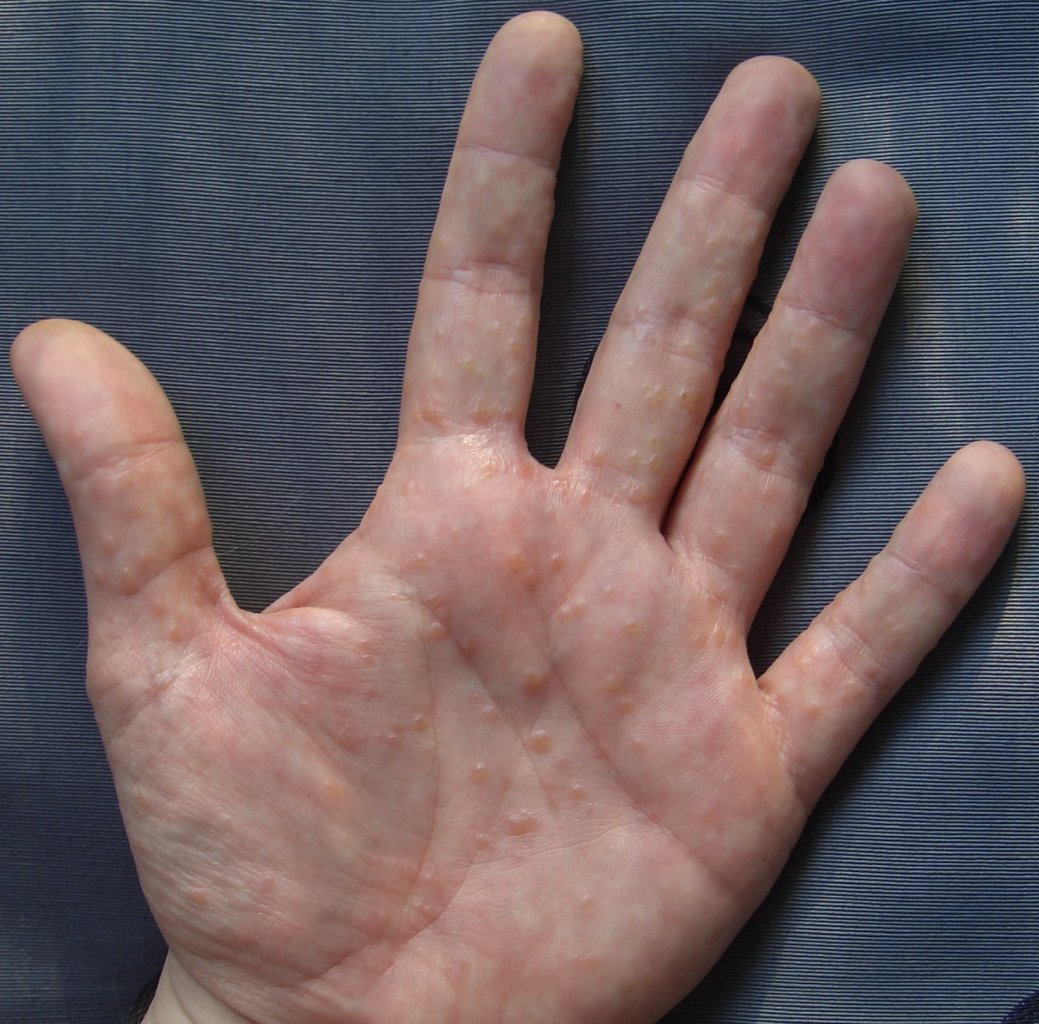
Palmar dyshidrosis

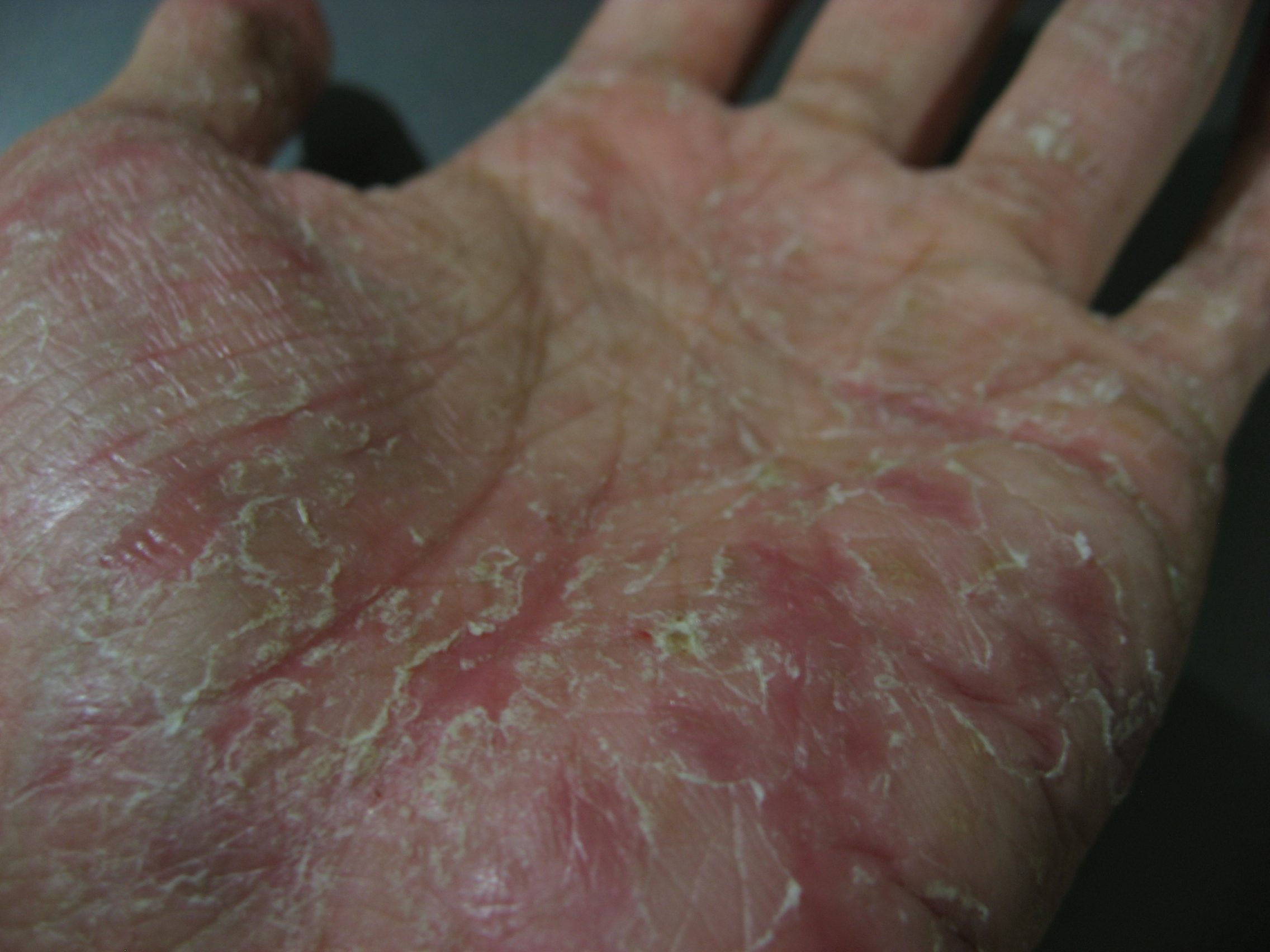
Advanced stage of palmar dyshidrosis on the palm showing cracked and peeling skin

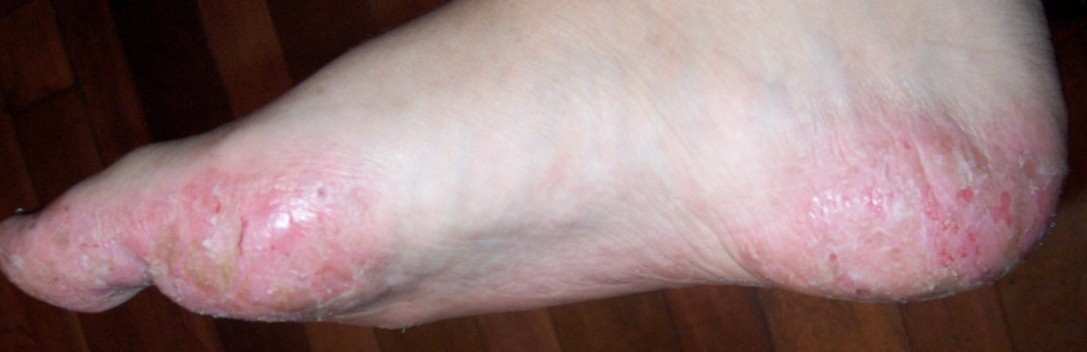
Advanced stage of dyshidrosis on the foot

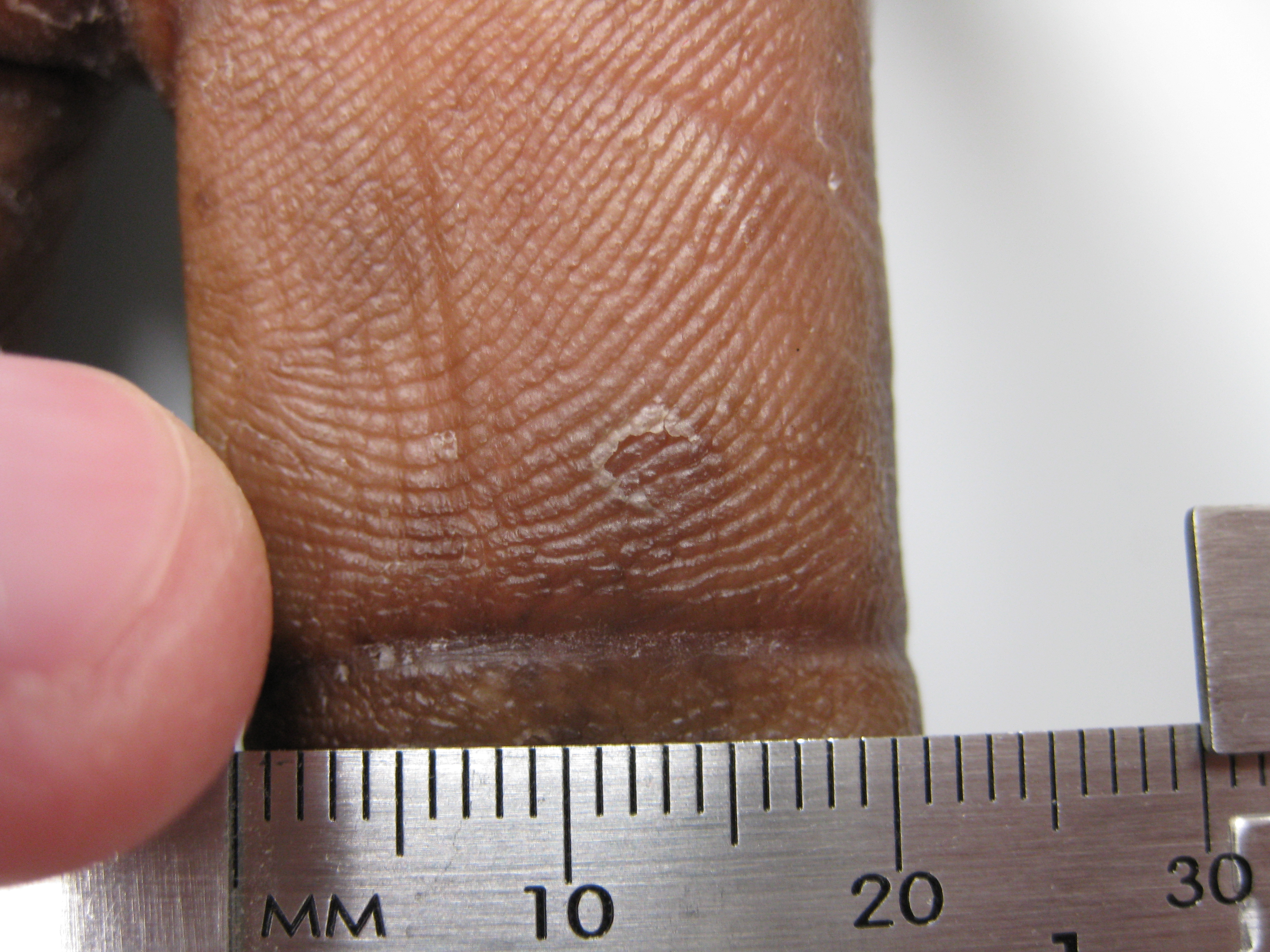
Rim of scale on the palmar surface of the thumb from a resolving dyshidrotic flare

== Causes ==
Whilst the exact causes of the condition are currently unknown, its triggers may include food allergens from a wide range of foods, including tuna, tomato, pineapple, chocolate, coffee, and spices among others, physical or mental stress, frequent hand washing, or metals. A number of studies have implicated balsam of Peru. A 2013 study found that dyshidrosis on the hands increased among those allergic to house dust mites, following inhalation of house dust mite allergen. Id reaction and irritant contact dermatitis are also possible causes.

In 2005, researchers from Anhui Medical University and the Chinese National Human Genome Center, Beijing, theorizing that mutations in single genes could predispose the condition, ran a study of a Chinese family with the condition present across four generations via autosomal dominant inheritance. Their analysis of haplotypes within the family identified a locus for the condition on chromosome 18.

== Diagnosis ==
Dyshidrosis is diagnosed clinically by gathering a patient's history and making observations. Allergy testing and culture may be done to rule out other problems. Severity of symptoms can also be assessed using the dyshidrotic eczema area and severity index (DASI), although it was designed for clinical trials and is not typically used in practice.

== Treatment ==
Avoiding triggers may be useful, as may be the application of a barrier cream or wearing of gloves. Treatment is generally made with steroid cream, although this can be dangerous in the long term due to the side effect of thinning of the skin, which is particularly troublesome in the context of hand dyshidrosis due to the amount of toxins and bacteria the hands typically come in contact with. High strength steroid creams may be required for the first week or two.

In especially acute and severe cases, systemic steroids can be taken orally; the immunosuppressive drug tacrolimus, or PUVA therapy may also be tried. Dapsone (diamino-diphenyl sulfone), an antibacterial, has been recommended for the treatment of dyshidrosis in some chronic cases.

Antihistamines such as Fexofenadine may be used to help with the itching. Potassium permanganate dilute solution soaks are popular, used to "dry out" the vesicles and kill off superficial Staphylococcus aureus, but they can be very painful and undiluted may cause significant burning.

Alitretinoin (9-cis-retinoic acid) has been approved for prescription in the UK. It is specifically used for chronic hand and foot eczema. It is made by Basilea of Switzerland (BAL 4079).

== Epidemiology ==
A study of 20,000 randomly-selected individuals in Gothenburg, Sweden in 1988 found 2% of male respondents and 3% of female respondents to have dyshidrosis, and that it comprised 5% of cases of hand eczema of any type. A study of 6300 pediatric patients in Turkey in 2006 found 1% to have dyshidrosis.

== History of classification ==
The condition was named dyshidrosis by the British dermatologist William Tilbury Fox in 1873, in a clinical lecture wherein he presented it as "a disordered condition of the sweat-follicles and the sweat-function... which is, as a rule, diagnosed as eczema, but is a separate and distinct affair... I have termed the disease dysidrosis [sic], because nature seems to have a difficulty in getting rid of the secreted sweat, which remains to distend the follicles, and to macerate the tissues." His theory that the condition was related to sweat was soon observed as unproven in scholarly publication and subsequent research on multiple occasions has shown an absence of relation to the sweat glands.

The condition had already been described clinically in a lecture in 1871 by Sir Jonathan Hutchinson, who had named it cheiro-pompholyx. Hutchinson's work was based on his observations, in 1864, of the same woman patient who Tilbury Fox would later describe in his own lecture. In 1875 Hutchinson published his book Illustrations of Clinical Surgery, describing the condition of "cheiro-pompholyx" without making reference to Tilbury Fox's work. This led to a dispute between the two dermatologists, played out in letters to The Lancet.

Tilbury Fox was aggrieved that his reading of Hutchinson's lecture suggested it to imply Hutchinson had been the first to formally describe the condition. Hutchinson apologised, saying that he had been in too much of a hurry to publish to read Tilbury Fox's work, and being aware that Tilbury Fox had described it as a sweating disorder, he had considered it to be a different condition to the one he was writing about. In the same letter he chastised Tilbury Fox for claiming propriety over describing the vesicles as resembling "a sago grain", a comparison that he had also independently made, and noted that the subject of his lecture in 1871 had been his patient for several years before Tilbury Fox's lecture.

In an editorial for the Chicago Medical Journal and Examiner, Dr. Nathan Smith Davis wryly described the dispute as "not the first occasion upon which two eminent men have contended for the honor of a lady's hand."

After a paper by Dr. A. R. Robinson describing the condition, entitled "Pompholyx" and mentioning the dispute, was published in the Archives of Dermatology the following year, Tilbury Fox responded with a strident critique of Robinson's conclusions and accused him of having misrepresented the facts of the dispute.

== See also ==
- Dermatitis herpetiformis – a similar condition caused by celiac and often mistaken for dyshidrosis.
- Epidermolysis bullosa – a genetic disorder that causes similar, albeit more severe, symptoms to those of dyshidrosis.
