= Circumostomy eczema =

Medical condition

- Specialty: Dermatology

Circumostomy eczema frequently occurs after an ileostomy or colostomy in which there is eczematization or autosensitization of the surrounding skin.

== See also ==
- Skin lesion
