= Candidid =

- Specialty: Dermatology

Candidid is a skin condition, an id reaction, similar to dermatophytids.

== See also ==
- Candidiasis
- List of cutaneous conditions
