= Leukemia cutis =

- Specialty: Dermatology

Leukemia cutis is the infiltration of neoplastic leukocytes or their precursors into the skin resulting in clinically identifiable cutaneous lesions. This condition may be contrasted with leukemids, which are skin lesions that occur with leukemia, but which are not related to leukemic cell infiltration. Leukemia cutis can occur in most forms of leukemia, including chronic myeloid leukemia, acute lymphoblastic leukemia, chronic lymphocytic leukemia, acute myeloid leukemia, and prolymphocytic leukemia.

Aleukemic leukemia cutis occurs when cancerous white blood cells penetrate the skin before they are detected in the bone marrow or peripheral circulation.

== Signs and symptoms ==
The clinical appearance of leukemia cutis varies, with the most common lesions being erythematous to violaceous papules or nodules (60%), followed by infiltrating plaques, generalized cutaneous eruption, and erythroderma. Oftentimes, they have no symptoms. Usually having a solid or rubbery consistency, the nodules might turn purpuric in patients who are thrombocytopenic.

Unusual presentations include those that resemble ulcers, stasis dermatitis, guttate psoriasis, and figurate erythemas. Leukemia cutis has also been reported to localize to injuries, intravenous catheters, herpes lesions, and recent surgical procedures.

== Causes ==
Leukemia cutis may develop concurrently with the diagnosis of systemic leukemia, come first, or come later. Most cases of leukemia cutis occur in the context of an existing leukemia (44–77%) or at the time of systemic leukemia presentation (23–44%). On rare occasions, leukemia cutis may occur before leukemia in the bone marrow or peripheral blood becomes observable.

Leukemia cutis is linked to a number of gene abnormalities, such as chromosome 8 numerical anomalies, translocation (8; 21) (q22; q22), and inversion (16) (p13; q22).

== Mechanism ==
Leukemic skin involvement's pathogenic mechanism is poorly understood. Nonetheless, it's thought that chemokine receptors, adhesion molecules, and the genetic features of leukemia all have an impact. Adhesion molecules, specifically chemokine integrin, may have a role in the migration of leukemic cells into the skin through processes known as skin-selective homing. Adhesion molecules and chemokine receptors may also have significant effects. On the dermal post-capillary venules, TARC (thymus- and activation-regulated chemokine)/CCL17 (CC chemokine ligand 17) and/or E-selectin may interact with the cutaneous leucocyte-associated antigen (CLA) receptor and CC chemokine receptor 4 (CCR4) on the leukemic cells. Leukemic cell migration and binding into the dermis may be facilitated by this process. Additionally, integrins and endothelial-bound chemokines may interact to promote leukemic cell migration into the dermis.

== Diagnosis ==
Leukemia cutis is diagnosed by looking at the morphologic pattern of skin infiltration, cytologic characteristics, and most importantly the tumor cells' immunophenotype. The diagnosis is frequently confirmed by correlation with peripheral blood and bone marrow results as well as clinical data.

== Treatment ==
Leukemia cutis is a localized symptom of a systemic underlying disease that requires systemic therapy tailored to the individual subtype of leukemia. Hematologic remission typically happens in tandem with a full or partial response to cutaneous infiltrations in the majority of individuals. Local radiotherapy, however, may be employed in patients with resistant leukemia cutis or recurrent skin infiltration. The treatment of refractory cutaneous leukemia has led to the proposal of simultaneous integrated boost with helical arc radiotherapy of total skin (HEARTS) for cutaneous symptoms.

== Outlook ==
The prognosis is poor, with many patients suffering from additional extramedullary diseases and low survival rates. Most patients pass away months after being diagnosed. Patients without skin lesions who have acute myelogenous leukemia had a 30% survival rate after two years, but those with skin lesions have a 6% survival rate, which indicates an unfavorable prognosis for leukemia cutis.

== Epidemiology ==
Leukemia cutis can occur anywhere between 2% and 30% of the time, depending on the underlying leukemia diagnosis.

== See also ==
- Granulocytic sarcoma
- List of cutaneous conditions
