= Lucien Jacquet =

French dermatologist and syphilogist (1860–1914)

Léonard Marie Lucien Jacquet (French pronunciation: [leɔnaʁ maʁi lysjɛ̃ ʒakɛ]; 30 October 1860 in Sauviat – 20 December 1914 in Royan) was a French dermatologist and syphilogist.

He studied medicine in Limoges and from 1883 served as an interne in Paris, where his instructors included Ernest Besnier and Georges Maurice Debove. He received his doctorate in 1888, became médecin des hôpitaux in 1896, and from 1903 worked at the Hôpital Saint-Antoine in Paris.

He is remembered for his research on pruritus and the pathogenesis of pruriginous eruptions, and studies of alopecia areata, especially in regards to its etiology as a "reflex neurosis". He also wrote on eczema and urticaria, and on the correlation of digestive disorders to the etiology and treatment of skin diseases. The term "Jacquet's erythema" is another name for diaper rash.

== Published works ==
With Louis-Anne-Jean Brocq he was co-editor of "Précis élémentaire de dermatologie", and with Brocq and Besnier, he made contributions to the four volume "La pratique dermatologique". Other written works by Jacquet are:

- L'Alcoolisme et les classes dirigeantes, 1902.
- Pseudo-contagion et fausses épidémies, 1906.
- Traitement de la syphilis (with Marcel Ferrand), 1908.
- A propos de la pelade d'origine dentaire, 1910.
- Les engelures et leur traitement bio-kinétique, 1914.
