= Pierre Adolphe Adrien Doyon =

French dermatologist and balneologist

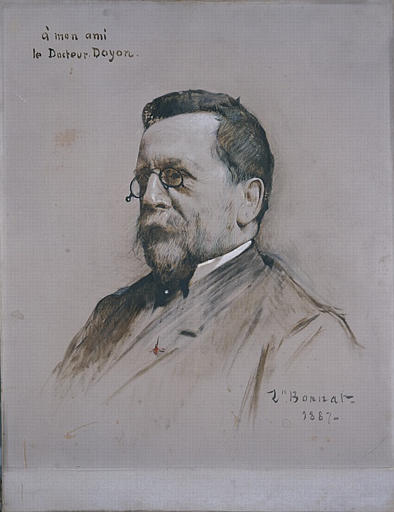
Portrait of Adrien Doyon by Léon Bonnat (1887)

Pierre Adolphe Adrien Doyon (French: [dwa.jɔ̃]; November 1, 1827 – September 21, 1907) was a French dermatologist and balneologist born in Grenoble.

From 1848 he was interne des hôpitaux at Lyon, where he became affiliated with the hospice of Antiquaille. In 1858 he relocated to Saint-Martin-d'Uriage, where he participated in development of its spa. Here he was appointed medical inspector, a position he maintained until his death in 1907.

Doyon is chiefly remembered for his published works. With Ernest Henri Besnier, he founded the journal Annales de dermatologie et de syphiligraphie. He spoke fluent German, and had professional relationships with dermatologists in Austria and Germany. Doyon is responsible for translating the works of Ferdinand von Hebra, Albert Neisser, Heinrich Auspitz, and Moritz Kaposi from German into French. With French syphilologist Charles-Paul Diday (1812-1894), he co-authored works on venereal disease, such as Les herpès génitaux and Thérapeutique des maladies vénériennes et des maladies cutanées.

Doyon was an officer of the Légion d'honneur and an associate member of the Académie Nationale de Médecine.
