= Émile Leredde =

French physician

Laurent Victor Louis Émile Leredde (26 October 1866, Paris – 1926) was a French physician, specialising in dermatology.

He studied medicine in Paris, where he received his doctorate in 1893. Later on, he served as laboratory chief at the Hôpital Saint-Louis.

In 1885, Leredde published with François Henri Hallopeau a report on the papular facial rash of tuberous sclerosis, then known as "adénomes sébacés" (adenoma sebaceum). The report also noticed the frequent association of epilepsy with the dermatological condition.

== Published works ==
- Hallopeau F; Leredde É (1885). "Sur un cas d'adenomes sébacés à forme sclereuse". Annales de dermatologie et de syphiligraphie. 6: 473–9.
- L'eczéma, maladie parasitaire nature, pathogénie, diagnostic et traitement, 1898.
- La nature syphilitique et la curabilité du tabes et de la paralysie générale, 1903.
- Photothérapie et photobiologie; rôle thérapeutique et rôle biologique de la lumière (with Lucien-Marie Pautrier), 1903.
- Thérapeutique des maladies de la peau, 1904.
- Études sur le sérodiagnostic et le traitement de la syphilis stratégie et tactique, 1913.
- Un fléau social la syphilis et l'organisation de la lutte antisyphilitique, 1922.

== See also ==
- Timeline of tuberous sclerosis
