= Pseudopelade of Brocq =

- Other names: Alopecia cicatrisata
- Specialty: Dermatology

The medical condition pseudopelade of Brocq is a flesh- to pink-colored, irregularly shaped alopecia that may begin in a moth-eaten pattern with eventual coalescence into larger patches of alopecia.

== Signs and symptoms ==
The most typical location for the first lesion is the vertex. The eyebrows and beard may be impacted. There are sporadic yet distinct alopecia confluent areas that resemble snow footprints. In the early stages, there is minor perifollicular erythema, and in the later stages, there is significant atrophy.

Pseudopelade lesions are spaced haphazardly. It typically manifests as an atrophic plaque that is porcelain white, hypopigmented, and somewhat depressed. Instead of the typical round or oval patches associated with alopecia areata, lesions are frequently uneven in shape.

== Causes ==
The pathogenesis of pseudopelade of Brocq is still not well understood. A number of potential contributing variables include senescence of the follicular stem cell reserve, acquired autoimmunity, and Borrelia infection. The pathophysiology of familial pseudopelade of Brocq may be influenced by heredofamilial variables, according to a small number of case reports and case series.

== Diagnosis ==
Pseudopelade of Brocq is identified using clinical and trichoscopy exclusion. There are two types of pseudopelade of Brocq, primary and secondary.

== Treatment ==
The progression of the disease eventually terminates on its own. There is no accepted course of care.

== See also ==
- Cicatricial alopecia
- Louis-Anne-Jean Brocq
