= Charles-Paul Diday =

French physician

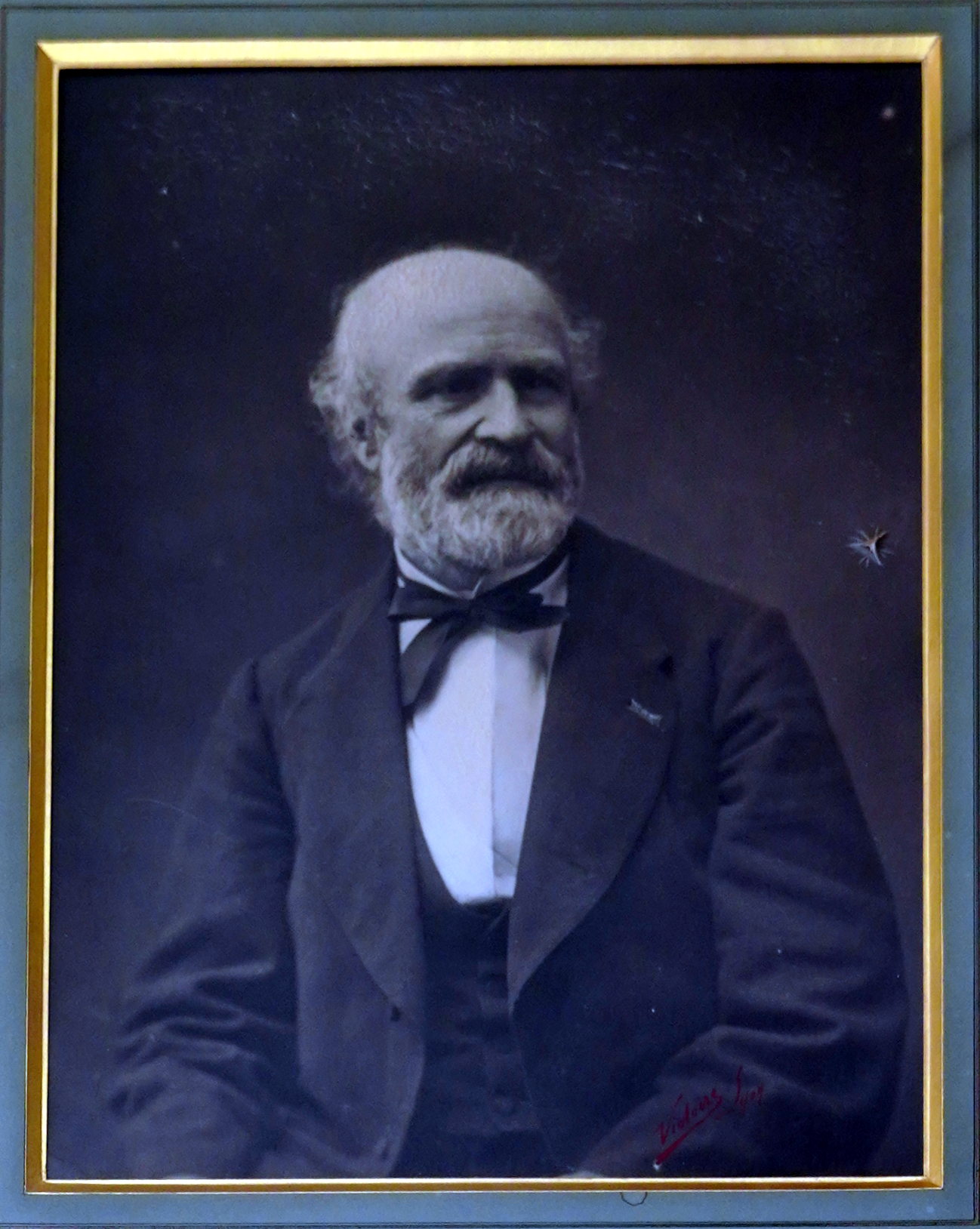
Presented at the museum of casts.

Charles-Paul Diday (1812 – January 8, 1894) was a French physician born in Bourg-en-Bresse.

He studied medicine in Paris, and later became chief surgeon at the Antiquaille in Lyon. He was founder of the Gazette médicale de Lyon, and for 34 years was general secretary of the Société de Médecine in Lyon.

He specialized in research of venereal disease, particularly congenital syphilis. His Traite de la syphilis des nouveau-nes et des enfants a la mamelle (A Treatise on Syphilis in New-Born Children and Infants at the Breast) was considered a landmark work on congenital syphilis, and has been translated into English.

In the prevention of the spread of venereal disease in France, Diday advocated mandatory distribution of condoms in houses of prostitution. He also proposed that all individuals possess a medical certificate of health and disease as a "sanitary passport". Diday believed that marriage was a prophylactic, stating: "Marriage prevents rapid consumption produced by the venereal excess by excluding the attraction of novelty and subjecting physical instinct to a more sublime moral goal".

== Selected written works ==
- Traité de la syphilis des nouveau-nés et des enfants à la mamelle (Paris 1854, also translated into English and Italian)
- Exposition critique et pratique des nouvelles doctrines sur la syphilis, suivie d'une étude sur denouveaux moyens préservatifs des maladies vénériennes (Paris, Londres et New York 1858)
- Histoire naturelle de la syphilis, leçons professées à l'école pratique de la faculté de médecine de Paris en mars 1863; (Paris 1863)
- Thérapeutique des maladies vénériennes et des maladies cutanées (Paris 1876, with Pierre Adolphe Adrien Doyon)
