= Subleukemic leukemia =

- Other names: Leukemia subleukemic, aleukemic leukemia cutis.
- Specialty: Oncology
- Symptoms: Fever, fatigue, weight loss, bone pain, bruising, bleeding, skin lesions
- Risk factors: Exposure to ionizing radiation, certain medications, certain genetic disorders
- Diagnostic method: Blood test
- Treatment: Chemotherapy, radiation therapy, stem cell therapy, medication

Subleukemic leukemia, also known as leukemia subleukemic and aleukemic leukemia cutis, is a rare, cancerous blood disease characterized by the presence of abnormal or atypical white blood cells in the peripheral blood while the total white blood cell count is within the normal range. It can also be characterized by leukemic cells in the skin and subcutaneous tissue which can manifest as visible lesions that are known as cutaneous lesions. Subleukemic leukemia has the same treatment plans as leukemia, including chemotherapy and radiation treatments.

== Signs and symptoms ==
Subleukemic leukemia does not have any widely known specific symptoms at this time. The most common symptoms presented by patients with the disease are fevers and fatigue. Other common symptoms include weight loss, bone pain, bruising, and bleeding. Additionally, subleukemic leukemia can cause visible skin lesions called cutaneous lesions or leukemia cutis. These lesions can be in the form of bull’s eye rashes, papules, or nodules and may progress into alternative forms.

== Causes ==
While subleukemic leukemia has no widely known causes at this time, there are risk factors that are known to increase an individual’s chance of developing the disease. These risk factors do not directly cause an individual to develop this disease, rather studies have shown that individuals with these risk factors are more likely to develop this disease than those without any risk factors. These risk factors include exposure to ionizing radiation, as well as a number of medications and genetic disorders. The medications and drugs include Chlorambucil, chloramphenicol, cyclophosphamide, melphalan, nitrogen mustards, phenylbutazone, and procarbazine. Genetic disorders that have been linked with an increased chance of developing subleukemic leukemia include ataxia telangiectasia, Bloom syndrome, Down syndrome, Fanconi anemia, and Li–Fraumeni syndrome. Some genes have been inferred to be connected to the disease, but this research is not widespread, accepted knowledge.

== Diagnosis ==
Subleukemic leukemia is diagnosed with a blood test to determine the number of normal and abnormal white blood cells present in the peripheral bloodstream. The peripheral bloodstream references all blood flow within the body not within organs. Individuals with subleukemic leukemia will likely have normal or low white blood cell counts. White blood cells, or leukocytes, are colorless blood cells that flow through the bloodstream and primarily counteract foreign bodies and diseases. High or low white blood cell counts affect the body’s ability to combat disease and can affect an individual’s health. Subleukemic leukemia can also be diagnosed by the skin lesions that may present on some individuals.

== Treatments ==
The widely available medicinal treatments for subleukemic leukemia are the same as widespread recommendations for leukemia such as chemotherapy, radiation therapy, stem cell therapy, and medication. Leukemia treatments typically have three objectives: immediate patient support and relief, future infection prevention, and elimination of the cancerous cells. Treatments can target cancerous cells, while also promoting the growth of healthy cells to help the patient’s immune response normalize.

== Prevalence ==
The prevalence of subleukemic leukemia in healthy individuals is not widely known at this time research studies primarily present the prevalence of cases where individuals have both Subleukemic Leukemia and another disease, such as pancytopenia. Pancytopenia is a disease where an individual has lower than average numbers of red and white blood cells, as well as platelets. This condition can lead to leukemia or other blood diseases. The prevalence of subleukemic leukemia in individuals with pancytopenia is currently known to be between 3-12%. The wide range in prevalence is the result of limited studies and information on the subject.

== Prognosis ==
The prognosis for this disease is not well understood. As it is currently widely accepted, the prognosis is primarily affected by the specific type of leukemia each patient has.

== Research ==
Subleukemic leukemia is a rare disease with little information widely available or known. This disease is currently widely understood to be a manifestation or precursor to leukemia. Because the abnormal white blood cells are in the peripheral blood and visible symptoms primarily present on the skin, many scientists think that it is a precursor to the bone marrow and full bloodstream involvement characteristic of leukemia. Research is currently being conducted to investigate causes and preventative measures for this disease.
