= Leukemid =

- Other names: Nonspecific cutaneous conditions associated with leukemia
- Specialty: Dermatology

Leukemids, also known as nonspecific cutaneous conditions associated with leukemia, are nonspecific skin lesions that occur with leukemia which are not related to leukemic cell infiltration. This condition may be contrasted with leukemia cutis, which is the infiltration of neoplastic leukocytes or their precursors into the skin resulting in clinically identifiable cutaneous lesions.

The term dates back to at least 1915.

== See also ==
- Id reaction
- Leukemoid reaction
