= Lucien-Marie Pautrier =

French dermatologist (1876–1959)

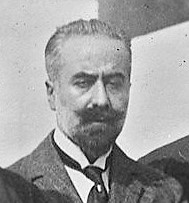
Lucien-Marie Pautrier

Lucien-Marie Pautrier (2 August 1876, in Aubagne – 9 July 1959, in Strasbourg) was a French dermatologist.

== Biography ==
He studied medicine in Marseille and Paris, where he was steered towards dermatology by Émile Leredde, and subsequently worked with dermatologist Louis-Anne-Jean Brocq at the Hôpital Saint-Louis. He served as a medical officer to a field artillery regiment in World War I, during which, he was awarded the Croix de Guerre for bravery and became a chevalier in the Légion d’Honneur (1916).

Following the end of hostilities, he became a professor of dermatology at the University of Strasbourg, where he established a worldwide reputation. In 1942 he accepted the chair of dermatology at the University of Lausanne, and after World II, returned as a professor to Strasbourg, where he retired two years later. In retirement, he pursued interests in art and music, and founded the Société des Amis de la Musique in Strasbourg.

== Associated medical terms ==
His name is associated with the term "Pautrier's microabscesses" in mycosis fungoides, even though he was not the first to describe them. Other dermatological terms that contain his name are:

- "Brocq-Pautrier angiolupoid" (with Louis-Anne-Jean Brocq): a specific form of sarcoidosis of the skin.
- "Brocq-Pautrier syndrome" (with Louis-Anne-Jean Brocq): rhomboid and shiny lesions on the midline of base of the tongue. Also known as glossitis rhombica mediana.
- "Pautrier-Woringer syndrome" (with Frédéric Woringer): another name for lymphadenopathia dermatopathica lipomelanotica.

== Published works ==
From 1921 to 1938 he was editor of the "Travaux de la Clinique des Maladies cutanées et syphilitiques". The following is a list of some of his numerous medical works:

- Les tuberculoses cutanées atypiques (tuberculides), Paris: C. Naud, 1903.
- Glossite losangique médiane de la face dorsale de la langue (with L. Brocq) "Annales de dermatologie et de syphilographie", Paris, 1914, 5: 1-18.
- L'Anatomie pathologique des chéloïdes (with Frédéric Woringer), Extrait des "Annales de dermatologie et de syphiligraphie", VIIe série, t. II, n° 11, November 1931.
- À propos de l'hypothèse d'une maladie lichéno-sclérodermique, Extrait du "Bulletin de la Société française de dermatologie et de syphiligraphie", December 1933.
- Acné comédonienne indurée, phlegmoneuse, à ponts fibreux, à chéloïdes vraies sur acné, Extrait des "Annales de dermatologie et de syphiligraphie", March 1934.
- Syndrome de Heerfordt et maladie de Besnier-Boeck-Schaumann. Bull Soc Med Hop Paris, 1937, 53: 1608.
