= Louis-Anne-Jean Brocq =

French dermatologist

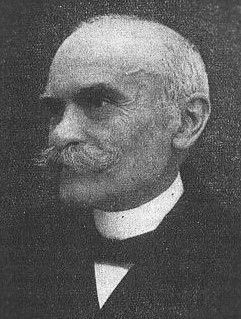
- Louis-Anne-Jean Brocq
- Born: 1 February 1856; Laroque-Timbaut, Lot-et-Garonne
- Died: 18 December 1928 (aged 72)
- Known for: keratosis pilaris parapsoriasis
- Scientific career
- Workplaces: Hospice la Rochefoucauld; Hôpital Saint-Louis

Louis-Anne-Jean Brocq (French pronunciation: [lwi an ʒɑ̃ bʁɔk]; 1 February 1856 – 18 December 1928) was a French dermatologist born in Laroque-Timbaut, a village in the department of Lot-et-Garonne.

He practiced medicine in Paris at the Hospice la Rochefoucauld, the Hôpital Broca, and from 1906 to 1921, the Hôpital Saint-Louis. As a young physician he studied and worked with Jean Alfred Fournier (1832–1915), Jean Baptiste Emile Vidal (1825–1893) and Ernest Henri Besnier (1831–1909).

Brocq provided early, comprehensive descriptions of numerous skin disorders, including keratosis pilaris, parapsoriasis and a form of dermatitis called "Duhring-Brocq disease" (named with Louis Adolphus Duhring and sometimes referred to as dermatitis herpetiformis). Other eponymous skin diseases named after him are "Brocq's pseudopelade", a condition involving progressive scarring of the scalp, and "Brocq-Pautrier angiolupoid", a specific type of sarcoidosis of the skin named in conjunction with Dr. Lucien-Marie Pautrier (1876–1959). With Pautrier he also described "Brocq-Pautrier syndrome" (glossitis rhombica mediana), characterized by rhomboid and shiny lesions on the midline of base of the tongue. Brocq is also credited for developing a tar solution used for the treatment of psoriasis.

Along with Ernest Besnier and Lucien Jacquet, he published the four-volume encyclopedia of dermatology La pratique dermatologigue (1900–1904).

== See also ==
- Pseudopelade of Brocq
