= Id reaction =

Skin condition which develops after some other inflammation or infection

- Other names: Cutaneous autosensitization
- Specialty: Dermatology

Id reactions (also known as disseminated eczema and generalized eczema) are types of acute dermatitis developing after days or weeks at skin locations distant from the initial inflammatory or infectious site. They can be localised or generalised. This is also known as an autoeczematous response and there must be an identifiable initial inflammatory or infectious skin problem which leads to the generalised eczema. Often intensely itchy, the red papules and pustules can also be associated with blisters and scales and are always remote from the primary lesion. It is most commonly a blistering rash with itchy vesicles on the sides of fingers and feet as a reaction to fungal infection on the feet, athlete's foot. Stasis dermatitis, allergic contact dermatitis, acute irritant contact eczema and infective dermatitis have been documented as possible triggers, but the exact cause and mechanism is not fully understood. Several other types of id reactions exist including erythema nodosum, erythema multiforme, Sweet's syndrome and urticaria.

== Presentation ==
=== Complications ===
Id reactions left untreated may become infected with bacteria.

== Causes ==
Causes include infection with dermatophytosis, Mycobacterium, viruses, bacteria and parasites. Eczematous conditions including contact allergic dermatitis and stasis dermatitis as well as stitches and trauma have also been associated with id reactions. Radiation treatment of tinea capitis has been reported as triggering an id reaction.

== Pathogenesis ==
Potential explanations include

1. Atypical immune recognition of autologous skin antigens
2. Stimulation of normal T cells by changing skin constituents
3. Lower threshold for skin irritation
4. Spreading of infectious antigens causing a secondary response
5. Hematogenous dissemination of cytokines from the primary site of inflammation

== Diagnosis ==
Although there are a multitude of varying appearances, the id reaction often presents with symmetrical red patches of eczema with papules and vesicles, particularly on the outer sides of the arms, face and trunk which occur suddenly and are intensely itchy occur a few days to a week after the initial allergic or irritant dermatitis. Most commonly, athlete's foot can lead to localised vesicles on hands, bacterial infections to erythema nodosum and herpes simplex virus to erythema multiforme.

The diagnosis is frequently made by treating the initial triggering skin problem and observing the improvement in the eczematous rash. Both the initial skin problem and the id reaction must be observed to make the diagnosis.

Not all dyshidrotic rashes are id reactions, but id reactions are often dyshidrotic-like.

Initial tests may include isolating a fungus by taking a swab and sending it for culture. Patch testing may be considered if there is suspicion of allergic contact dermatitis.

A skin biopsy is rarely necessary, but if done mostly shows an interstitial granulomatous dermatitis, some lesions being spongiotic. Id reactions cannot be distinguished from other skin diseases by histopathology. However, they can be distinguished from other id reactions by histopathology.

=== Differential diagnosis ===
Other rashes that occur in a widespread distribution can look like an id reaction. These include atopic dermatitis, contact dermatitis, dyshidrosis, photodermatitis, scabies and drug eruptions.

== Treatment ==
Id reactions are frequently unresponsive to corticosteroid therapy, but clear when the focus of infection or infestation is treated. Therefore, the best treatment is to treat the provoking trigger. Sometimes medications are used to relieve symptoms. These include topical corticosteroids, and antihistamines. If opportunistic bacterial infection occurs, antibiotics may be required.

== Prognosis ==
A full recovery is expected with treatment. Recurrent id reactions are frequently due to inadequate treatment of the primary infection or dermatitis and often the cause of recurrence is unknown.

== Epidemiology ==
With no particular affinity to any particular ethnic group, seen in all age groups and equally amongst males and females, the precise prevalence is not known.

== History ==
The suffix -id has its origins in Greek, referring to a father–son relationship. German dermatologist Josef Jadassohn (1863–1936), who coined the term id, had observed a dermatophytosis causing a secondary allergic skin dermatitis. In 1928, Bloch recorded that the peak of the dermatophyte infection corresponded with the id reaction.

== See also ==
- Candidid
- Dermatophytid
- Leukemid
- List of cutaneous conditions
