= Dermatophytid =

- Specialty: Dermatology

Dermatophytids are fungus-free disseminated skin lesions resulting from induced sensitization in patients with ringworm infections.

== See also ==
- Candidid
- Skin lesion
