= Ernest Besnier =

French dermatologist and medical director

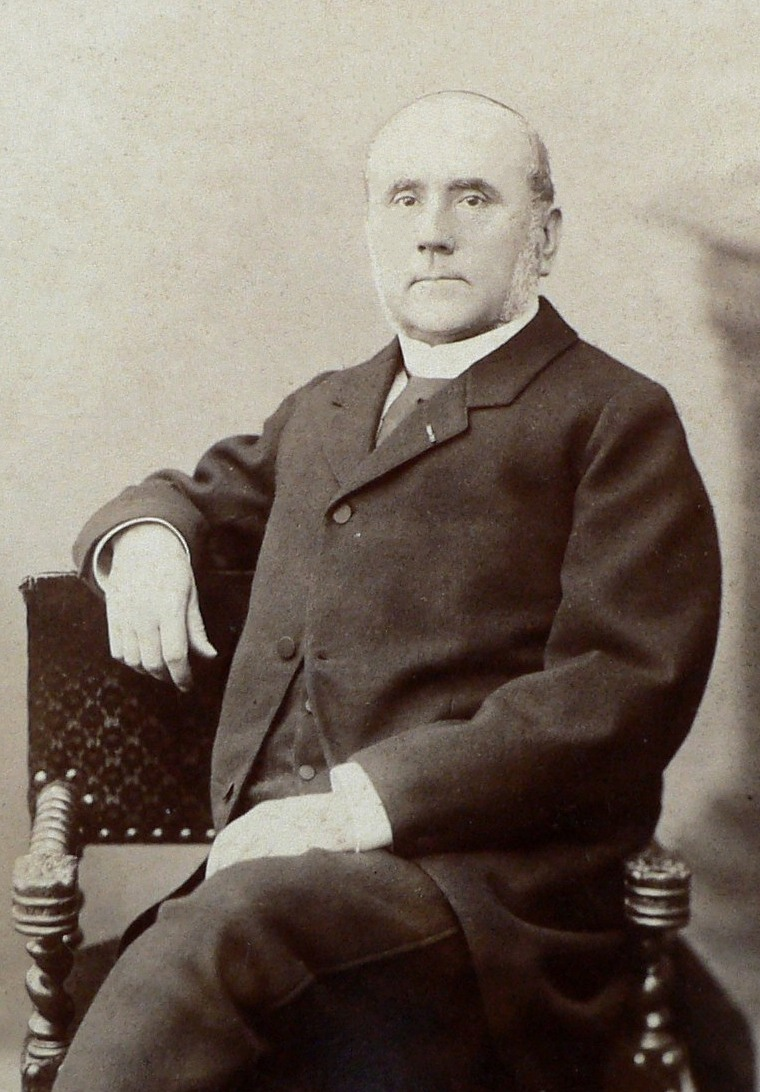
- Ernest Besnier
- Born: Ernest Henri Besnier; 21 April 1831; Honfleur, Calvados, France
- Died: 15 May 1909 (aged 78); Paris, France
- Medical career
- Sub-specialties: Dermatology

Ernest Henri Besnier (French: [ɛʁnɛst ɑ̃ʁi benje]; 21 April 1831 – 15 May 1909, Paris) was a French dermatologist and medical director of the Hôpital Saint-Louis in Paris.

== Early life ==
Ernest Besnier was born on 21 April 1831 in Honfleur, département Calvados. He studied medicine in Paris, where in 1857 he received his medical doctorate.

== Career ==
In 1863, Besnier became médecin des hôpitaux. He succeeded Pierre-Antoine-Ernest Bazin as director at the Hôpital Saint Louis.

He built histopathology and parasitology laboratories at the hospital, and is credited with originating the term biopsy for tissue samples. In 1889 he proved an early description of skin lesions associated with sarcoidosis, introducing the name "lupus pernio".

With Pierre Adolphe Adrien Doyon (1827–1907), he founded the medical journal Annales de dermatologie et de syphiligraphie. Besnier attempted to balance the differences between the French and Viennese approaches to dermatological medicine, and in 1881 with Doyon, translated Moritz Kaposi's famous book on skin diseases (Pathologie und Therapie der Hautkrankheiten in Vorlesungen für praktische Ärzte und Studirende) from German into French (Leçons sur les maladies de la peau). With Louis-Anne-Jean Brocq and Lucien Jacquet, he published a four volume encyclopedia of dermatology, titled "La pratique dermatologique" (1900–04).

== Death and legacy ==
Besnier died in Paris on 15 May 1909.

The eponymous Besnier's prurigo is named for a skin disorder that often follows infantile atopic dermatitis.
