= Besim Ömer Akalın =

Turkish physician (1862–1940)

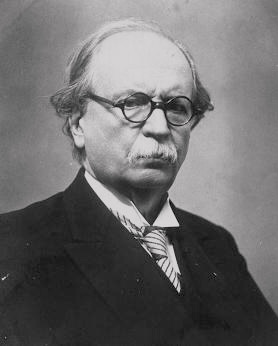
- Born: 1 July 1862; Constantinople, Ottoman Empire
- Died: 19 March 1940 (aged 77); Ankara, Turkey
- Known for: Founder of modern obstetrics and gynaecology in Turkey.
- Medical career
- Profession: Physician

Besim Ömer Akalın (1 July 1862 – 19 March 1940) was a Turkish social democratic politician and physician who established modern obstetrics and gynaecology in Turkey and was the director of the Turkish Red Crescent society. He first emphasized in Turkey the fact that nursing was a separate discipline and should be taught in a specialized program. Between 1935 and 1940, he served as a member of the Turkish Grand National Assembly. His image was depicted on a former Turkish postcard stamp.

== Early life ==
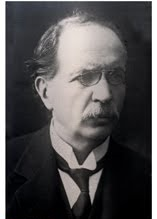
Besim Ömer Akalın, 1930s

Besim Ömer was born in the Ottoman capital of Constantinople on July 1, 1862, to Ömer Şevki Pasha, a deputy of Sinop Province in the first Ottoman Parliament, and his wife Afife. He had a sister Mecide, and three brothers Azmi, Agah and Kemal Ömer.

He finished the primary education in Pristina, then in the Ottoman Empire. He began the secondary education in Kosovo, completed in Kuleli Military Medicine High School (Ottoman Turkish: Kuleli Askerî Tıbbiye İdâdisi). He then studied at the Imperial Medicine College (Ottoman Turkish: Mekteb-i Tıbbiye-i Şâhâne) graduating with distinction in 1885.

He served briefly as military physician at the Greek border, before he had to return to Istanbul after catching typhus. He took the post of an assistant lecturer in the birthing center of the Medicine College. Besim Ömer was then sent to Paris, France, where he worked as an assistant physician at the Hôpital de la Charité, and completed his medical specialization in 1891. He wrote two books about his experience in Paris. His book titled "Doğum Tarihi" (literally: "History of Birth") is considered as the first-ever modern work in Turkey about birth.

After his return from Paris, he was promoted to the rank of a general. He tried several times to open up a birthing center, his application was however declined by Sultan Abdul Hamid II (reigned 1876–1909). In 1892, he established, secretly from the Sultan's Court, the country's first birthing clinic in a small building next to the Medical College. It served for 17 years at the site before it was transferred to a larger building.

== Career in medicine ==
Besim Ömer took the post of a lecturer at the Midwifery Training School. He became a pioneer in the field of midwifery by publishing the first books titled "Doğurduktan Sonra" (After Giving Birth), "Ebe Hanımlara Öğütlerim" (My Advice to Midwives) and "Ebelik" (Midwifery).

In 1899, he became chief physician of the birthing center. After the restoration of the constitutional monarchy in 1908, his officer rank was demoted from general to colonel. However, people continued to call him Pasha, the Ottoman title for general.

Besim Ömer countered the local mentality that prevented Muslim women from having jobs and touching men even for medical purposes. He applied Japanese methods in training nurses in Istanbul. In 1911, he personally trained daughters of well-known Muslim families in Istanbul in a six-month-long volunteer nursing course. For the first time, these nurses were able to take part in the medical care of wounded soldiers. During the years 1913–14, he organized nursery training courses for ordinary women. In these courses, he trained around 300 nurses, most of them serving during the Gallipoli campaign (1915–16) and at other arenas of World War I. During this period, Besim Ömer acted as the director general of Turkish Red Crescent.

He was among the founders of the "Association of Fight against Tuberculosis" (Turkish: Verem Savaş Derneği) in 1918 and of the "Association of Child Welfare" (Turkish: Çocukları Koruma Derneği) in 1921. In 1919, he was elected rector of Darülfünun, the forerunner of Istanbul University. Besim Ömer led the way for Turkish women to become first female physicians by enabling a group of girls to enroll at the Imperial Medical College in 1922. Six women graduated in 1928. Following the educational reforms for universities that took place in 1933, Besim Ömer remained out of the staff.

He was the author of more than forty professional works in medicine, mostly in midwifery, nursery and child welfare.

== Later years and death ==
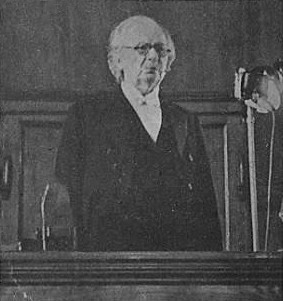
Besim Ömer Akalın during a speech in the parliament

Besim Ömer adopted the family name Akalın after the introduction of the Surname Law in 1934. He entered politics, and was elected twice, in 1935 and again in 1939, into the parliament as a deputy of Bilecik Province for the Republican People's Party.

Besim Ömer Akalın died on 19 March 1940, in Ankara.

== Major works ==
- Doctors and Advocates (Doktorlar Ve Avukatlar, 1906)
- Sıhhatnüma-i İzdivaç (1891)
- Sıhhatnüma-i Tenasül (1891)
- Sıhhatnüma-i Etfal (1885)
- Sıhhatnüma-i Aile (1886)
- Sıhhatnüma-i Nevzat yahut Beşik-Kundak-Emzik (1894)
- Tabib-i Etfal (translation from French) (1896)
- Tenasül (1889)
- Ukm-ı İnanet (1888)
- Zayıf ve Vakitsiz Doğan Çocuklara Takayyüd (1886)
- İpnotizma-Manyetizma (1889)
- Mukeyyifat ve Müskirattan Tütün (1886)
- Müskirat (1887)
- Afyon ve Esrar (1887)
- Deniz Banyoları (1890)
- Şişmanlık ve Zayıflık (1885)
- Gözlerin Hıfz-ı Sıhhati (1886)
- Dişlerin Hıfz-ı Sıhhati (1883)
- Su (1883)
- Kendini Bil (1894)
- Midenin Hıfz-ı Sıhhati (1892)
- Çocuklara Aş (1898)
- İdadiler için Hıfz-ı Sıhhat (1914)
- Veba (1886)
- Yalova Kaplıcası (1901)
- Fransa Mont Dore Kaplıcası (1928)
- Irzahane (1903)
- Doğururken ve Doğurduktan Sonra (1904)
- Küçük Çocuklara Vefeyat Kesreti (1906)
- Çocuk Sıhhati Serisi (6 volumes)
- Nevsal-i Afiyet Birinci Sene (1899)
- Nevsal-i Afiyet Salname-i Tıbbi (1900)
- Nevsal-i Afiyet Salname-i Tıbbi (1904)
- Nevsal-i Afiyet Salname-i Tıbbi (1906)
- Emraz-ı Nisa (1898)
- Hastabakıcılık Dersleri (1915)
- Ebelik Dersleri (1928)
- İlk İmdad ve Muavenet (1918)
- Yüz Yıl Yaşamak (1927)
- Fen ve İzdivaç (1924)
- Güç Doğum (1933)
- Kısırlık (1931)
- Doğum Tarihi (1932)
- Üzüm ve Üzümle Tedavi (1933)
- Gençliği Koruma, Çok Yaşama (1934)

== Bibliography ==
- Lewenson, Sandra Beth (2006), Nursing History Review: Official Publication of the American Association for the History of Nursing, Springer Publishing Company, ISBN 0-8261-1482-2.
- Vahide, Şükran (2006), Islam in modern Turkey, SUNY Press, ISBN 0-7914-6515-2.
