= Lichenification =

- Symptoms: Itching, hyperpigmentation, bumpy/ leathery skin, papules on skin
- Causes: Scratching/rubbing skin, chemical irritants, friction from clothing
- Treatment: Topical steroids, steroid injections, anti-itch creams

Lichenification is a cutaneous condition caused by consistent irritation of the skin, such as by scratching or rubbing including by friction from clothing, or by chemical irritants. Lichenification can develop from scratching existing skin conditions such as eczema and psoriasis (secondary lichenification), and can appear on previously healthy skin when repeatedly aggravated (primary lichenification). Primary lichenification is often self inflicted due to psychiatric conditions including obsessive-compulsive disorder and anxiety disorder.

== Appearance ==
The initial stage of lichenification presents as hyperpigmentation of the skin, which is followed by the appearance of small hard papules, which can often be perceived only by touch, giving the lesion a bumpy or “pebbly” texture. When these papules are damaged, they will excrete blood and pus and as the condition progresses, deeper layers of the skin become thickened and indurated. Once fully developed, the effected skin will present with a leathery, "bark-like" texture and remain itchy and inflamed.

Common areas of occurrence are noted in points of the body that are easily accessible or prone to itchiness, notably the nape of the neck, wrists, hands, forearms, waist, scrotum, vulva, thighs, lower legs and feet.

The term lichenification was coined by Louis-Anne-Jean Brocq in 1891, due to the condition’s visual similarity to lichen.

== Treatment ==
If affected skin is left alone, the ailment may slowly go away on its own. The itch-scratch-cycle makes this method uncommon. Lichenification is generally treated with topical steroids and moisturizers; light-therapy and acupuncture are also noted.
