= Turkish Red Crescent =

Turkish equivalent of the Red Crescent

- Türk Kızılay
- Logo of the Turkish Red Crescent
- Formation: 1868; 158 years ago
- Founded at: Ottoman Empire (1868) re-established in Ankara, Turkey (1935)
- Type: Humanitarian Aid
- Legal status: Active; auxiliary role to the Turkish government and public authorities in emergency and humanitarian operations
- Purpose: Disaster relief; emergency medical aid; refugee support; blood donation; healthcare; social services; international humanitarian aid
- Headquarters: Ankara, Turkey
- Members: International Federation of Red Cross and Red Crescent Societies (IFRC)
- Official language: Turkish
- President: Fatma Meriç Yılmaz
- Staff: 6,423 (headquarters & branch employees, 2023)
- Volunteers: 327,114 (2023)
- Website: www.kizilay.org.tr

The Turkish Red Crescent (Turkish: Türk Kızılay) is the Turkish affiliate of the International Red Crescent and the first worldwide adopter of the crescent symbol for humanitarian aid.

Being the largest humanitarian foundation in Turkey, its roots goes back to the Crimean War from 1853 to 1856 and the Russo-Turkish War from 1876 to 1878, where disease overshadowed battle as the main cause of death and suffering among Turkish soldiers.

Operating to this day as a not-for-profit volunteer-based social service, it is considered one of the most important charity organizations in the Muslim world.

== History ==
Ottoman Red Crescent Society (Hilâl-i Ahmer Cemiyeti) emblem

The organization was founded under the Ottoman Empire on 11 June 1868 and was named "Hilâl-i Ahmer Cemiyeti" (Society of the Crimson Crescent), or in French the "Croissant-Rouge Ottomane" (Ottoman Red Crescent). With first president being Marko Paşa.

It later took on the names:

- "Ottoman Red Crescent Society" in 1877
- "Turkey’s Red Crescent Community" in 1923
- "Turkish Red Crescent Community" in 1935
- "Turkish Red Crescent Society" in 1947

It was renamed Kızılay by Mustafa Kemal Atatürk in 1935, after the foundation of the Republic of Turkey in 1923.

Beginning with the Russo-Turkish War (1877–1878), the Turkish Red Crescent Society has provided medical relief to soldiers in all battlefields in which Turkey was present, through mobile and fixed hospitals, patient transportation services, hospital vessels, trained nurses and volunteers. It has provided humanitarian care regardless of nationality to all civilians affected by war. It has been involved in disaster relief and aid in natural disasters in Turkey. It has participated in international relief and response activities.

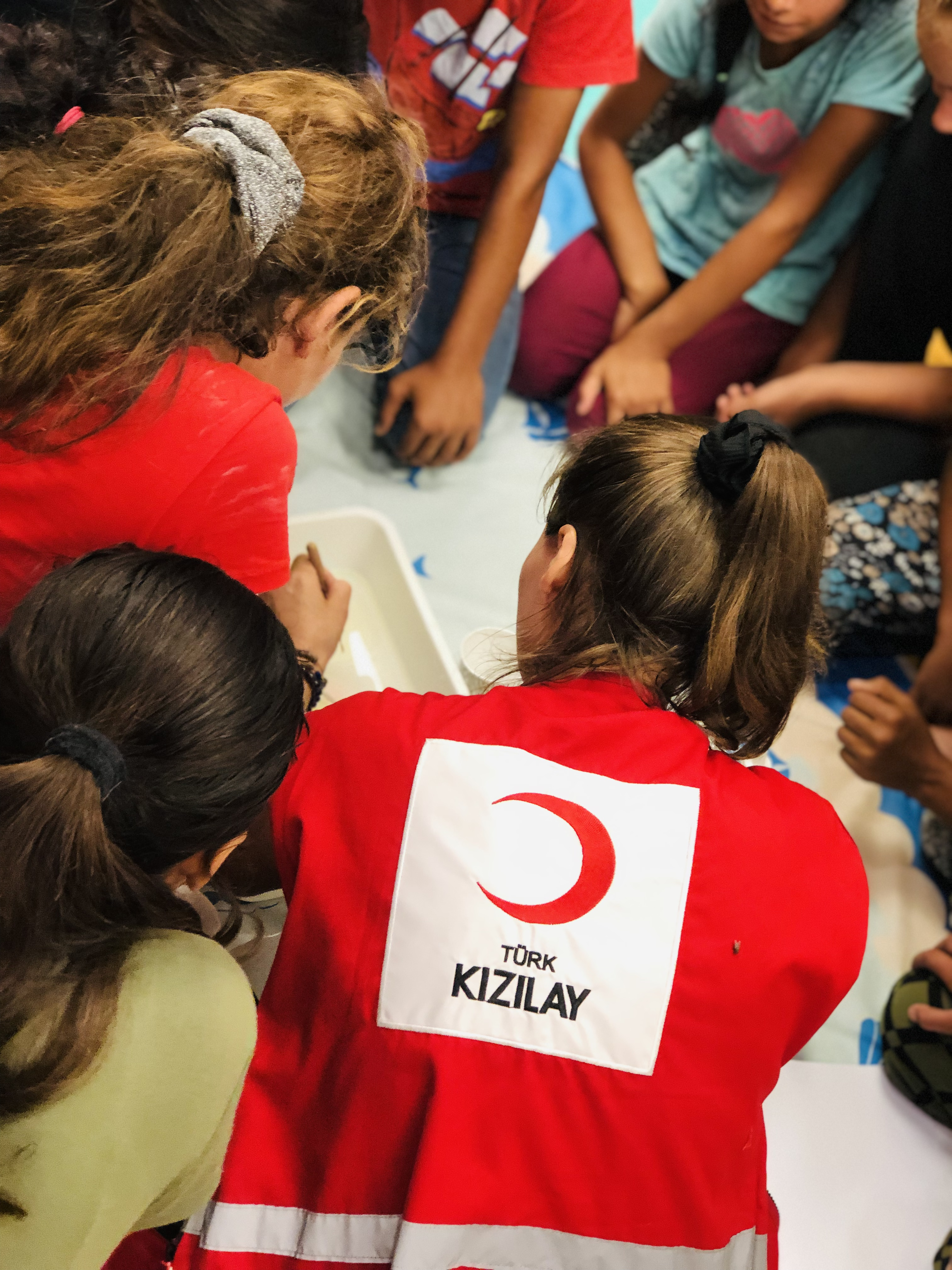
A Turkish Red Crescent staff conducting activities for refugee children

Examples of disaster relief activities include:

- 2003 Bam earthquake
- 2004 Indian Ocean earthquake and tsunami
- 2005 Kashmir earthquake
- 2006 Lebanon War
- Syrian Civil War
- 2023 Turkey–Syria earthquake

== Activities ==
- Disaster management: Operations in 78 countries in natural and human related disasters in the last 10 years
- Blood donations provided through 17 Regional Blood Centers, 65 Blood Donation Centers with more than 150 mobile blood donation vehicles Kinik, the head of the Turkish Red Crescent, said "Nearly 2.4 million people have donated blood to the Red Crescent in 2017, and there were 274,000 stem cell donations."
- International aid
- Health care: Hospitals in Konya, Kayseri and medical centers throughout Turkey
- First aid: 33 First aid centers throughout Turkey providing healthcare and first aid instruction. First aid training provided to a total of 100,000 people
- Immigration and Refugee Services: Assists the relevant public authorities in meeting the needs of refugees in Turkey, including shelter, health, and education. Runs 23 camps for the Refugees of the Syrian Civil War
- Youth & Educational Services: Projects aimed at youth to increase community awareness regarding disasters. Provides scholarships and runs youth camps
- Nuclear weapons: During and after the treaty on the prohibition of nuclear weapons the Turkish Red Crescent was an advocate, urging states to eliminate nuclear weapons
- Operations overseas: The Turkish Red Crescent now has permanent representatives in Somalia, Iraq, Palestine, Pakistan, Bangladesh, and Yemen in order to lend a helping hand to the vulnerable people of those war- torn countries.

== Partnerships ==
=== Partnership with Qatar Charity ===
The Turkish Red Crescent has recently begun to partner with Qatar Charity (QC) on various humanitarian projects.

In December 2016, the Turkish Red Crescent together with QC made a $10 million deal with the Turkish government to provide services for Syrian refugees in Turkey over the next five years. Kerem Kinik, head of the organization added "We have common areas of interest such as Palestine, Iraq and Somalia... this collaboration is just a beginning".

In June 2016, the organization and QC provided aid to victims of flooding and violence in Beledweyne, Somalia. Somalia has lost much of its rural areas to al-Shabaab, a terrorist organization with links to al-Qaeda that consistently carries out attacks throughout the country.

=== Partnership with Turkish government ===
Following the 2016 Turkish coup d'état attempt, the Turkish Red Crescent backed the Turkish government, sending a letter to hundreds of international aid organizations and NGOs, including to organizations of the United Nations and Red Crescents in 191 total countries. Like the government, the Turkish Red Crescent blamed the Gülen movement (which the government of Turkey considers a terrorist organization) for the coup attempt.

== Global gathering ==
In November 6–11, 2017, the International Red Cross and the Turkish Red Crescent movement brought together 190 national Red Cross and Red Crescent societies. Some major issues they discussed were: migration where they addressed prioritizing safety and assistance, nuclear weapons where they were working towards their elimination, and health where they addressed mental health and psycho social needs. Other issues included the need to involve affected people in relief and recovery efforts; the use of explosive weapons in popular areas; and the looming threat of epidemics and pandemics.

== Gallery ==
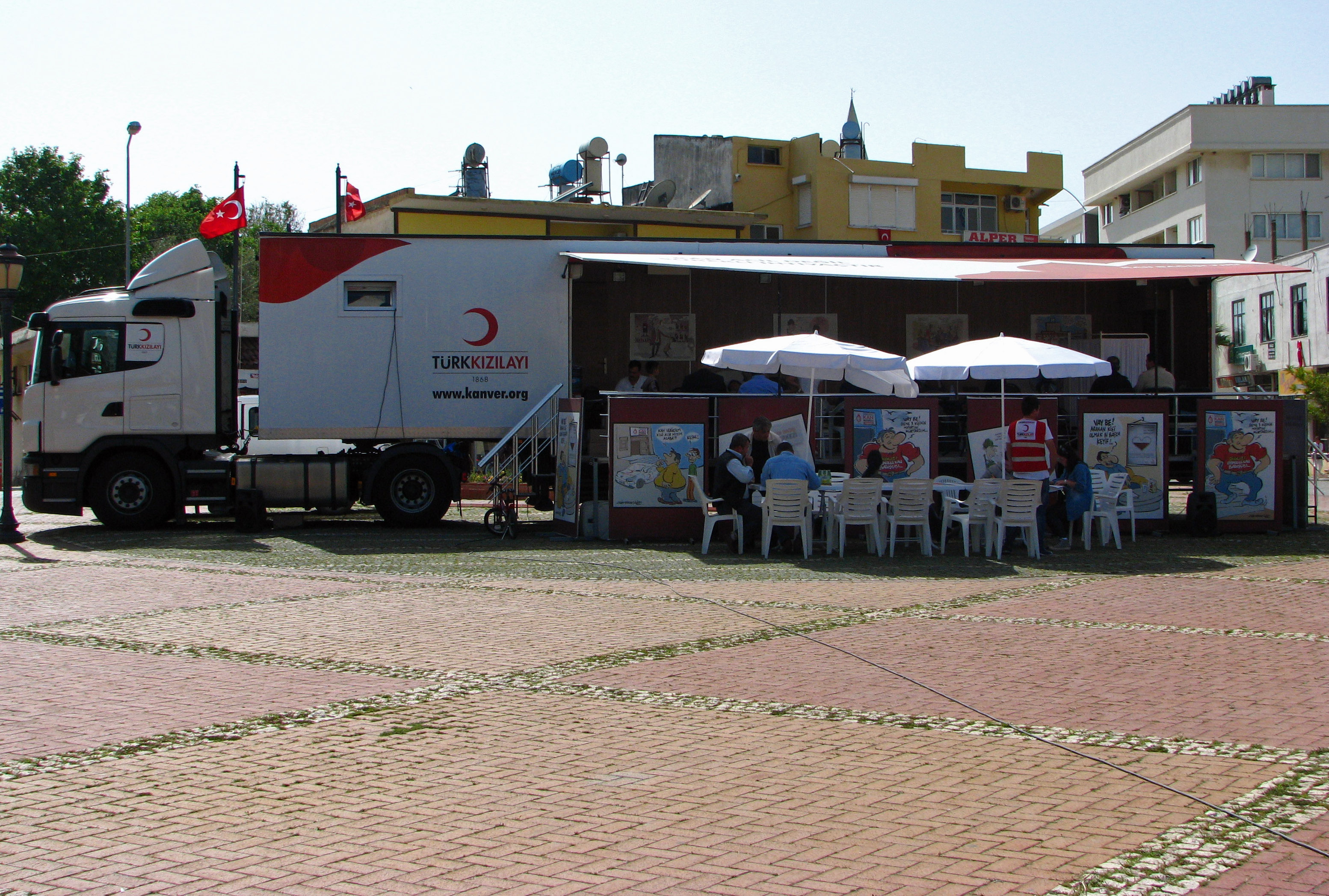
A Bloodmobile of Turkish Red Crescent in Gazipaşa

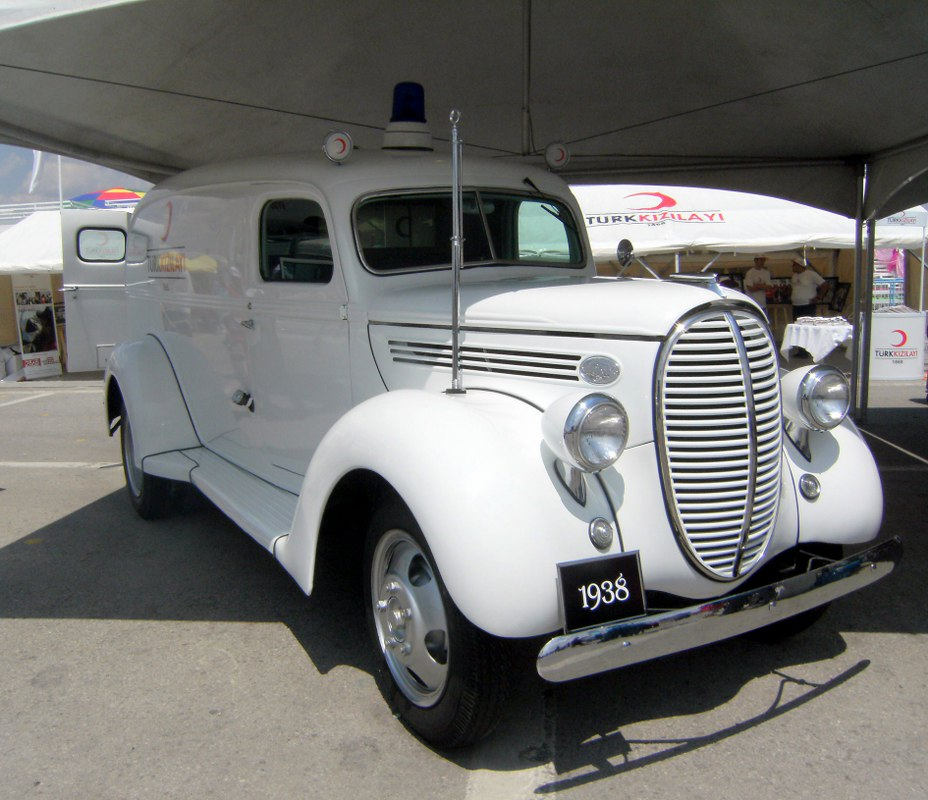
1938 Ford Model 81C ambulance in Turkey

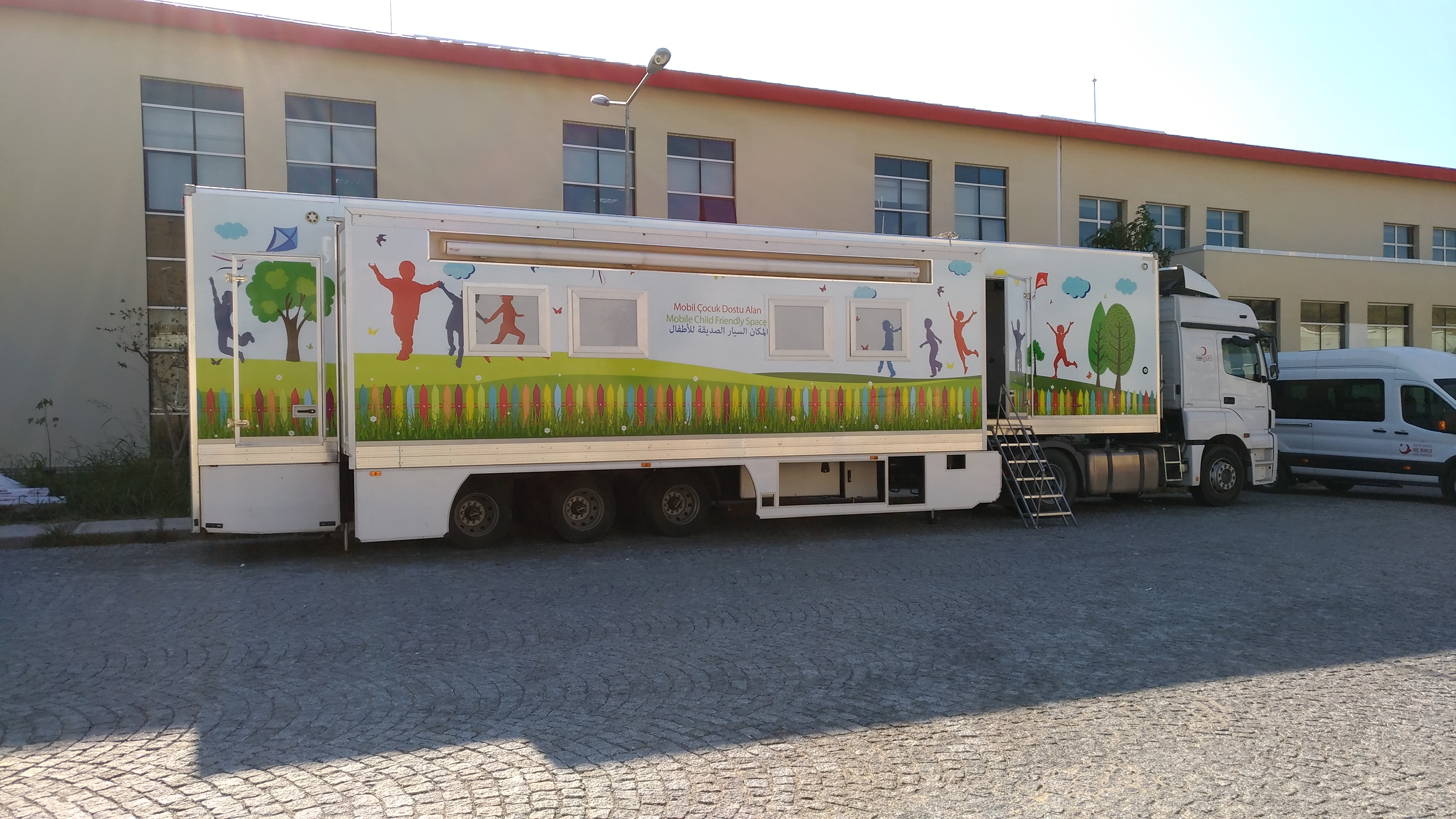
A view of Mobile Child Friendly Space operated by the Turkish Red Crescent

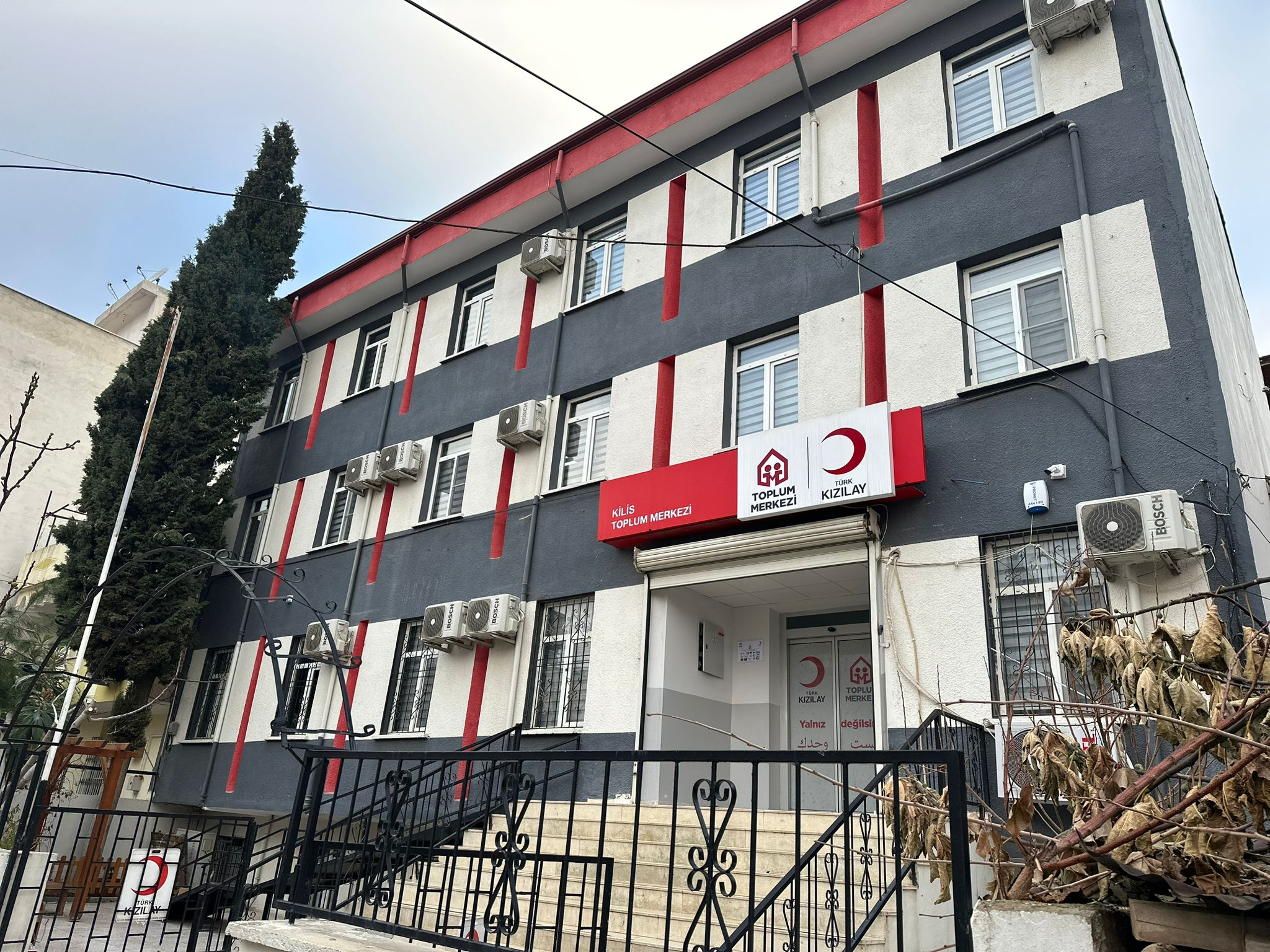
A view of Kilis Community Centre operated by the Turkish Red Crescent

== See also ==
- International Red Cross and Red Crescent Movement
