= Pityriasis =

- Specialty: Dermatology

Pityriasis commonly refers to flaking (or scaling) of the skin. The word comes from the Greek πίτυρον 'bran'.

== Classification ==
Types include:

- Pityriasis alba, dry, fine-scaled, pale patches on the face
- Pityriasis lichenoides chronica, caused by a hypersensitivity reaction to infectious agents
- Pityriasis lichenoides et varioliformis acuta, a disease of the immune system
- Pityriasis rosea, a type of skin rash
  - Pityriasis circinata,
- Pityriasis rubra pilaris, reddish-orange patches (Latin: rubra) on the skin
- Pityriasis versicolor, a skin eruption on the trunk and proximal extremities, usually caused by a fungus
- Dandruff, historically called Pityriasis capitis
- Pityriasis amiantacea, condition of the scalp in which thick tenaciously adherent scale infiltrates and surrounds the base of a group of scalp hairs

== See also ==
- Desquamation
- List of cutaneous conditions
