= Small plaque parapsoriasis =

- Other names: Chronic superficial dermatitis
- Specialty: Dermatology

Small plaque parapsoriasis characteristically occurs with skin lesions that are round, oval, discrete patches or thin plaques, mainly on the trunk.

Subtypes:

- Xanthoerythrodermia perstans is a distinct variant with lesions that are yellow in color.
- Digitate dermatosis is a distinct variant with lesions in the shape of a finger and distributed symmetrically on the flanks.

== See also ==
- Papulosquamous disorders
- Parapsoriasis
- List of cutaneous conditions
