= Josef Kyrle =

Austrian pathologist and dermatologist

Josef Kyrle (8 December 1880 – 30 March 1926) was an Austrian pathologist and dermatologist who was a native of Schärding.

He studied medicine at the University of Graz, and afterwards was an assistant to Anton Weichselbaum (1845–1920) at the clinic of pathological anatomy at the University of Vienna. In 1907 he was an assistant to Ernst Finger (1856–1939) at the dermatology clinic in Vienna, and in 1918 he became an associate professor.

Kyrle specialized in microscopic and histological research of skin disorders. His name is associated with Kyrle disease, being also known as "hyperkeratosis penetrans". In 1916 Kyrle referred to this condition as hyperkeratosis follicularis et parafollicularis in cutem penetrans. It is characterized by keratotic plugs that develop in hair follicles and eccrine ducts, penetrating the epidermis and extending into the dermis. This disorder is often associated with diabetes mellitus and kidney failure.

He performed investigations on the use of Jauregg's malaria therapy for treatment of syphilis in its early stages, and with Dr. Weichselbaum, he performed important studies involving the origin and development of the islets of Langerhans in the fetus.

== Selected writings ==
- Über den derzeitigen Stand der Lehre von der Pathologie und Therapie der Syphilis; sechs Vorlesungen für praktische Ärzte, 1924 - On the current state involving the doctrine of pathology and therapy of syphilis.
- Vorlesungen über Histo-Biologie der menschlichen Haut und ihrer Erkrankungen, 1925-27 - Lectures about histo-biology of human skin and its diseases.
