= Retiform parapsoriasis =

- Specialty: Dermatology

Retiform parapsoriasis is a cutaneous condition, considered to be a type of large-plaque parapsoriasis. It is characterized by widespread, ill-defined plaques on the skin, that have a net-like or zebra-striped pattern. Skin atrophy, a wasting away of the cutaneous tissue, usually occurs within the area of these plaques.

== See also ==
- Parapsoriasis
- Poikiloderma vasculare atrophicans
- List of cutaneous conditions
