= PUVA-induced acrobullous dermatosis =

- Specialty: Dermatology

PUVA-induced acrobullous dermatosis is a cutaneous condition characterized by the sudden occurrence of tense blisters, usually on the distal extremities, during long-term PUVA therapy

== See also ==
- PUVA keratosis
- List of cutaneous conditions
