= Viktor Mucha =

Austrian Dermatologist

Viktor Mucha (17 April 1877 in Königgrätz – 6 June 1933 in Vienna) was a dermatologist from Austria. He was involved in early syphilis research.

He studied medicine at the universities of Vienna and Strasbourg, receiving his doctorate in 1904. From 1905 he worked as an assistant under Ernst Finger in the department of skin and venereal diseases at Vienna. He was also a physician at the Kaiserin-Elisabethspital (1909–13) and the St. Anna-Kinderspital (1913/14). In 1912 he obtained his habilitation for dermatology and syphilology at the university, becoming an associate professor in 1921.

In 1906, with Karl Landsteiner, he developed the technique of dark-field microscopy to visualize the organisms that cause syphilis.

Pityriasis lichenoides et varioliformis acuta is sometimes referred to as "Mucha–Habermann disease"; a skin disorder named in conjunction with German dermatologist Rudolf Habermann (1884–1941).

== See also ==
- Pityriasis lichenoides et varioliformis acuta
