= Marie-Guillaume-Alphonse Devergie =

French dermatologist

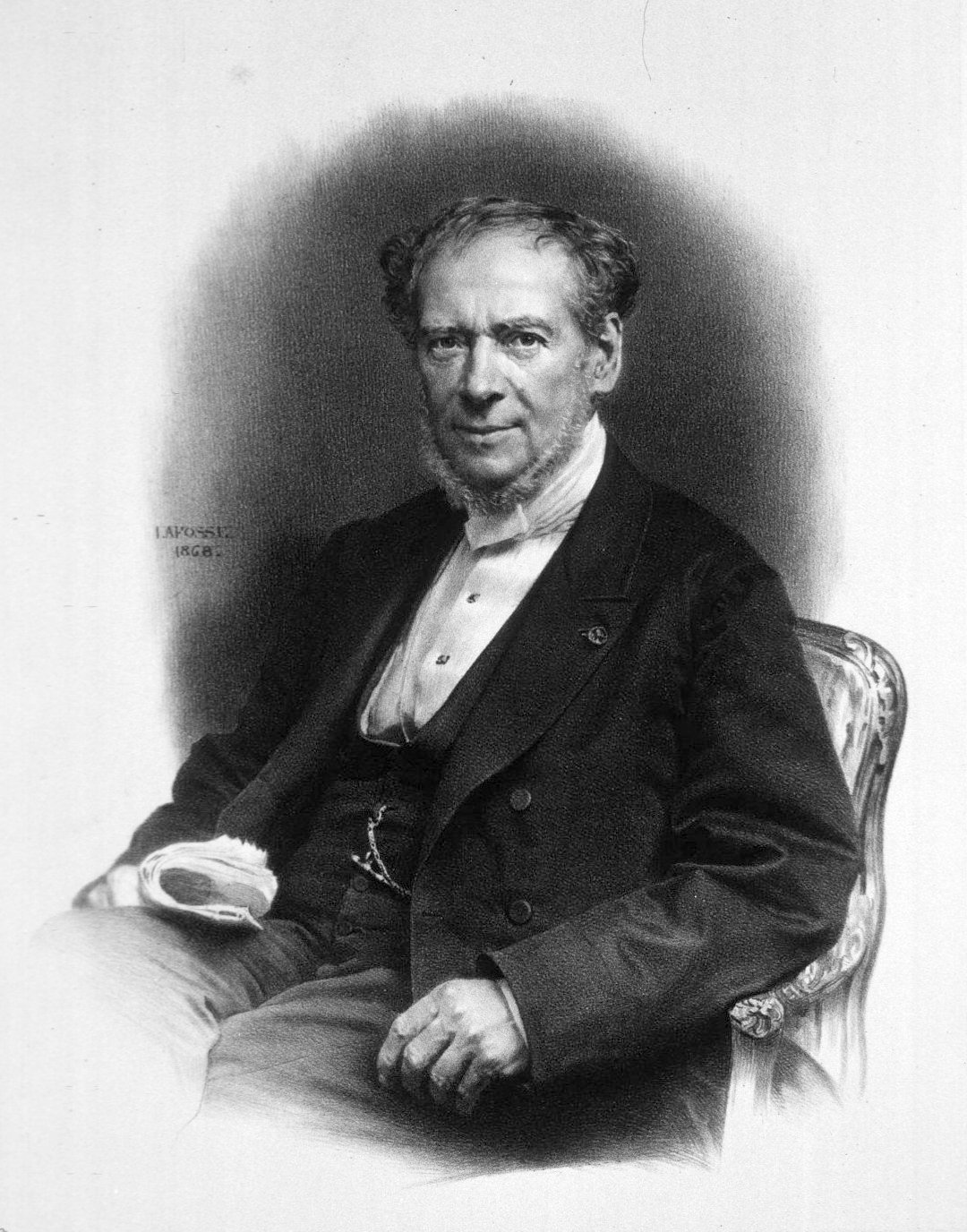
Alphonse Devergie

Marie-Guillaume-Alphonse Devergie (February 15, 1798 – October 2, 1879) was a French dermatologist born in Paris.

In 1834 he became a physician of Parisian hospitals (médecin des hôpitaux), and in 1840 succeeded Laurent-Théodore Biett (1781–1840) at the Hôpital Saint-Louis, where he practiced medicine until his retirement. During his career he was also associated with the Hôpitaux Bicêtre and St. Antoine. In 1874 he was elected president of the Académie de Médecine.

In 1856 Devergie was the first to describe a chronic papulosquamous disorder known as pityriasis rubra pilaris, also referred to as "Devergie's disease", a term introduced by Ernest Henri Besnier (1831-1909) in 1889.

In 1854 he published an important textbook on skin diseases titled Traité pratique des maladies de la peau.

When he retired, Devergie donated his collection of dermatological watercolors to the Parisian hospital administration. This donation was instrumental in creation of a medical museum at Hôpital Saint-Louis.

Devergie was one of the founders of forensic medicine in France, and was co-publisher of the journal Annales d’hygiène publique et de médecine légale with Mathieu Orfila (1787–1853), Gabriel Andral (1797–1876), Jean-Étienne Dominique Esquirol (1772–1840) and François Leuret (1797–1851). In 1836 he published a two-volume book on judicial medicine called Medecine legale, theorique et pratique.
