= Tinea circinata =

Tinea circinata may refer to:

- Pityriasis rotunda
- Tinea corporis
