= IGH =

IGH (or derivative) may refer to:

- Idiopathic guttate hypomelanosis, a dermatological condition
- Igh (trigraph), used in Irish orthography
- Immunoglobulin heavy chain (IgH), the large polypeptide subunit of an antibody
  - IGH@, the Immunoglobulin heavy locus, in biology
- Institut IGH, a Croatian company
- Internal geared hubs, used on bicycles
- Inver Grove Heights, Minnesota, U.S.
