= Anton Weichselbaum =

Austrian pathologist and bacteriologist

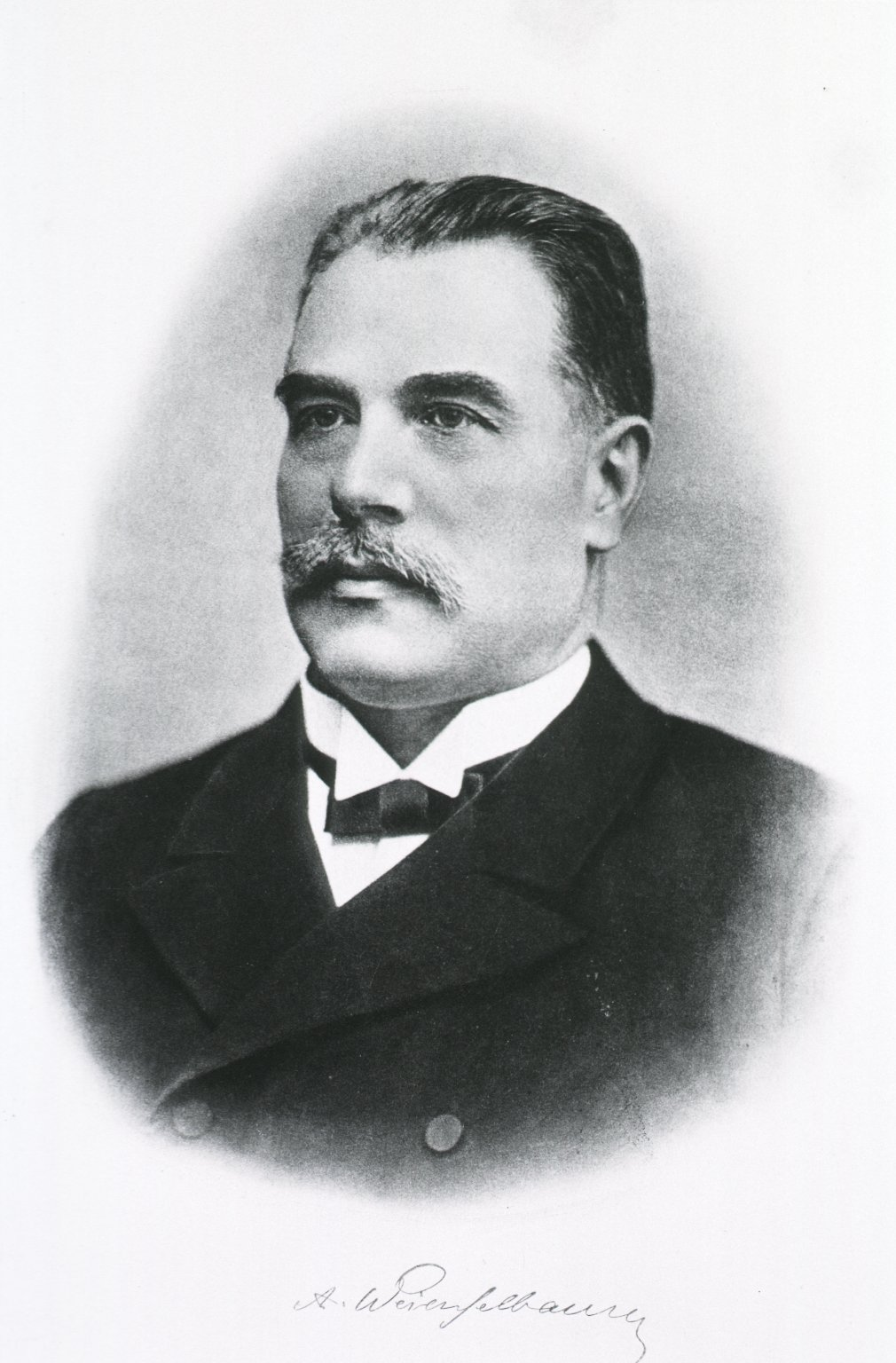
- Anton Weichselbaum (1845–1920)
- Born: 8 February 1845; Schiltern
- Died: 26 October 1920 (aged 75)
- Scientific career
- Fields: Bacteriology
- Workplaces: University of Vienna

Anton Weichselbaum (8 February 1845 – 23 October 1920) was an Austrian pathologist and bacteriologist. He was among the first scientists to recognize the importance of bacteriology for the field of pathological anatomy.

== Biography ==
Weichselbaum was born on 8 February 1845, near the town of Langenlois.

In 1869, he received his medical doctorate in Vienna, and subsequently worked as an assistant to pathological anatomist Josef Engel (1816–1899). In 1885, he was appointed an associate professor of pathological histology and bacteriology, and from 1893 to 1916, he was director of the pathological-anatomical institute at the University of Vienna. In 1912, he became university rector.

Some of his better known assistants were serologist Karl Landsteiner (1868–1943), bacteriologist Anton Ghon (1866–1936) and dermatologist Josef Kyrle (1880–1926).

In 1887, he was the first to isolate the causative agent of cerebrospinal meningitis, a bacterium he named Diplococcus intracellularis meningitidis. He conducted important research involving tuberculosis, and is credited for founding the first Lungenheilstätte (pulmonary health institute) in Austria (Alland, Niederösterreich). Also, he provided the first comprehensive description of local bone erosion in arthritis.

Weichselbaum was a son-in-law to chemist Franz Schneider (1812–1897). Weichselbaumgasse, a thoroughfare in the Favoriten district of Vienna is named in his honor.

== Written works ==
Among his better known writings was Grundriss der pathologischen Histologie (1892), being later translated into English and published as "The Elements of Pathological Histology". Other noted works by Weichselbaum are the following:

- Über Entstehung und Bekämpfung der Tuberkulose, 1896 - On formation and control of tuberculosis.
- Parasitologie, in Handbuch der Hygiene, volume 9; Jena, 1899 - Parasitology
- Epidemiologie, in Handbuch der Hygiene, volume 9; Jena, 1899 - Epidemiology
- Diplococcus pneumoniae, in Handbuch der pathogenen Mikroorganismen, volume 3; Jena, 1903.
- Meningokokken, in Handbuch der pathogenen Mikroorganismen, volume 3; Jena, 1903 - Meningococcus.
- Pneumokokkenimmunität, in Handbuch der pathogenen Mikroorganismen, volume 4; Jena, 1904 - Pneumococcal immunity.
- Über die Infektionswege der menschlichen Tuberkulose, 1907 - On the modes of transmission of human tuberculosis.
- Über die Beziehungen zwischen Körperkonstitution und Krankheit, 1912 - On the relationship between physical condition and disease.
