= Poikiloderma =

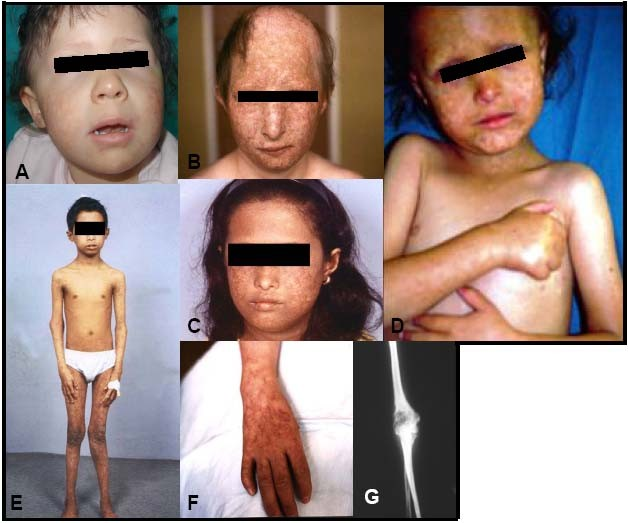
- People with varying manifestations of poikiloderma
- Specialty: Dermatology

Poikiloderma is a skin condition that consists of areas of hypopigmentation, hyperpigmentation, telangiectasias and atrophy. Poikiloderma of Civatte is most frequently seen on the chest or the neck, characterized by red colored pigment on the skin that is commonly associated with sun damage.

== Types ==
- Poikiloderma vasculare atrophicans
- Poikiloderma of Civatte
- Hereditary sclerosing poikiloderma

== Causes ==
- Congenital
1. Rothmund-Thompson syndrome
2. Dyskeratosis congenita
3. Mendes da Costa syndrome
- Other hereditary causes
1. Degos-Touraine syndrome
2. Diffuse and macular atrophic dermatosis
3. Hereditary sclerosing poikiloderma of weary
4. Kindler syndrome
5. Xeroderma pigmentosum
- Acquired
1. Injury to cold, heat, ionizing radiation, exposure to sensitizing chemicals
2. Lichen planus
3. Dermatomyositis
4. Lupus erythematosus
5. Systemic sclerosis
6. Cutaneous T cell lymphomas

== Pathogenesis ==
The exact cause of poikiloderma of Civatte is unknown; however, extended sun exposure, namely the ultraviolet light emitted by the sun, is the primary factor.

== Treatment ==
Albeit difficult, treatment of poikiloderma of Civatte involves the delivery of multiple wavelengths of intense pulsed light (IPL) to the affected area.

== See also ==
- Osteopoikilosis
- List of cutaneous conditions
- POIKTMP syndrome
