= Poikiloderma of Civatte =

- Specialty: Dermatology

Poikiloderma of Civatte is a cutaneous condition and refers to reticulated red to red-brown skin patches with telangiectasias. It is identifiable as a reddish-brown discoloration on the side of the neck, usually on both sides. It is more common in lighter-skinned individuals, in females rather than in males and more often affects middle-aged to elderly women. This disease is basically a change of the skin due to dilation of the blood vessels in the neck. "Civatte" was the French dermatologist who first identified it in the 1920s.

== See also ==
- Cutis rhomboidalis nuchae
- List of cutaneous conditions
- Poikiloderma
- Poikiloderma vasculare atrophicans
