= Hair casts =

- Specialty: Dermatology

Hair casts, also known as pseudonits, represent remnants of the inner root sheath, and often occur in great numbers and may mimic nits in the scalp.

== Signs and symptoms ==
Hair casts are distinct, solid, shining, white, freely mobile, tubular accretions that measure 2 to 7 mm in length and wrap the scalp's hair shafts.

== Causes ==
Although the exact cause is frequently unknown, pityriasis amiantacea, seborrheic dermatitis, hair nodes, scalp psoriasis, traction-based hairstyles, and hair spray use have all been linked to their occurrence.

== Diagnosis ==
According to research using electron microscopy, the real peripillous hair casts are typically constituted of the exterior root sheath, with the internal root sheath occurring infrequently. Some are even composed of both the internal and external sheaths.

== Treatment ==
Coaltar or keratolitic shampoo treatment is not effective. The best results are obtained when the cylinders are manually removed using a comb and a 0.025% retinoic acid solution.

== See also ==
- List of cutaneous conditions
