= Borderline leprosy =

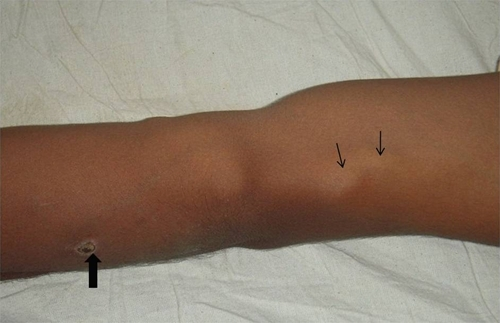
- Unusually thickened ulnar nerve (fine arrows) in a patient with borderline leprosy. There is a hypopigmented skin lesion on the dorsal aspect of the elbow (a thick arrow).
- Specialty: Infectious diseases

Borderline leprosy is a cutaneous skin condition with numerous skin lesions that are red irregularly shaped plaques.

== See also ==
- Leprosy
- Skin lesion
