= C13H12O2 =

The molecular formula C_{13}H_{12}O_{2} (molar mass: 200.23 g/mol) may refer to:

- Bisphenol F, a small aromatic organic compound
- Monobenzone, an organic chemical in the phenol family
