= Poikiloderma vasculare atrophicans =

- Other names: Parapsoriasis variegata or Parapsoriasis lichenoides
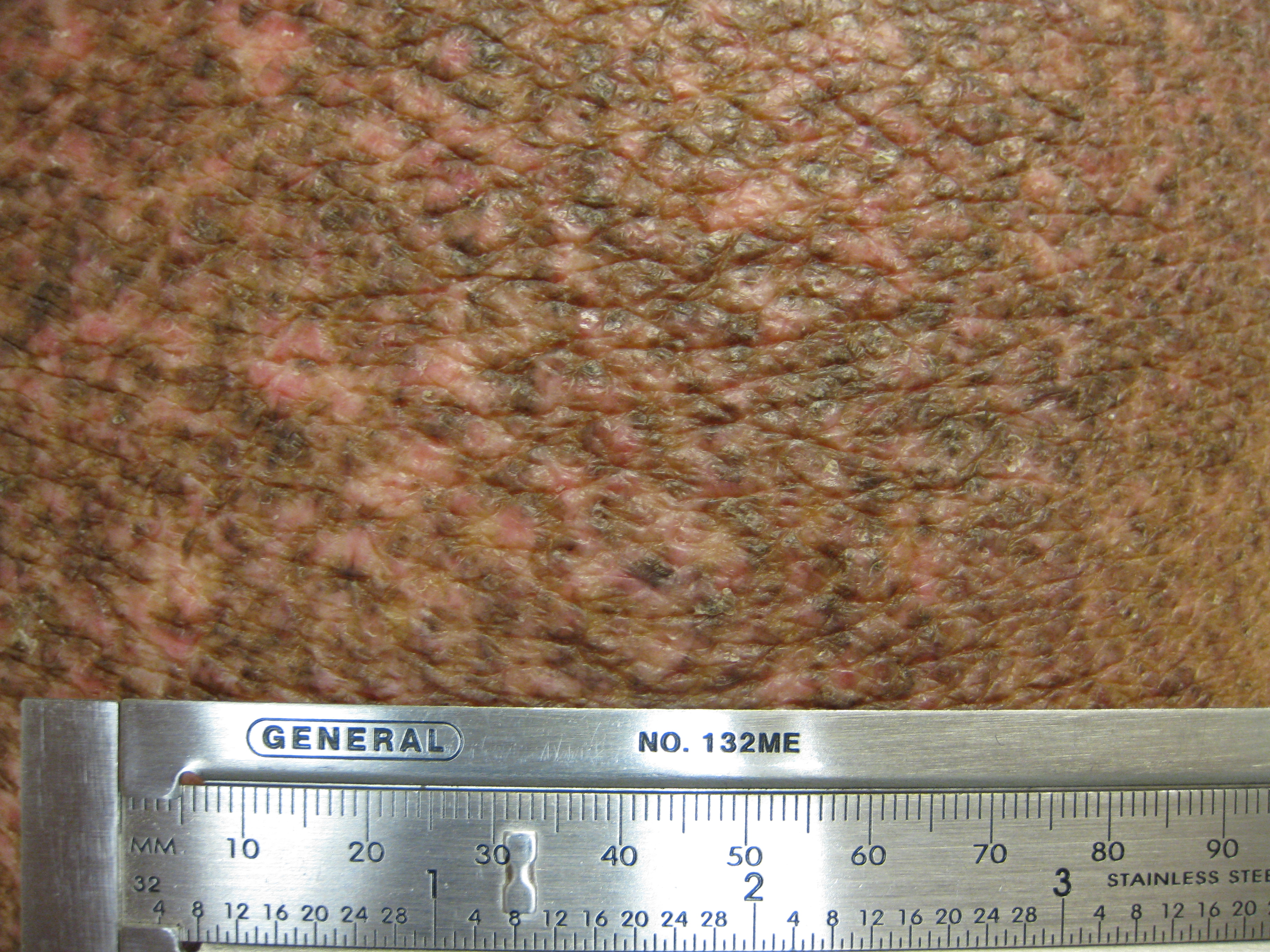
- Typical skin changes and discoloration described as poikiloderma vasculare atrophicans
- Specialty: Dermatology

Poikiloderma vasculare atrophicans (PVA), is a cutaneous condition (skin disease) characterized by hypo- or hyperpigmentation (diminished or heightened skin pigmentation, respectively), telangiectasia and skin atrophy. Other names for the condition include prereticulotic poikiloderma and atrophic parapsoriasis. The condition was first described by pioneer American pediatrician Abraham Jacobi in 1906. PVA causes areas of affected skin to appear speckled red and inflamed, yellowish and/or brown, gray or grayish-black, with scaling and a thinness that may be described as "cigarette paper". On the surface of the skin, these areas may range in size from small patches, to plaques (larger, raised areas), to neoplasms (spreading, tumor-like growths on the skin).

Mycosis fungoides, a type of skin lymphoma, may be a cause of PVA. The condition may also be caused by, associated with or accompany any of the following conditions or disorders: other skin lymphomas, dermatomyositis, lupus erythematosus, Rothmund–Thomson syndrome, Kindler syndrome, dyskeratosis congenita, and chronic radiodermatitis. Rare causes include arsenic ingestion, and the condition can also be idiopathic.

PVA may be considered a rare variant of cutaneous T-cell lymphoma, a non-Hodgkin's form of lymphoma affecting the skin. It may also be included among a number of similar conditions that are considered as precursors to mycosis fungoides. PVA is believed to be a syndrome closely associated with large-plaque parapsoriasis and its cohort retiform parapsoriasis; including PVA, all three conditions fit within an updated view of the once ambiguous classification scheme known as parapsoriasis.

== Presentation ==
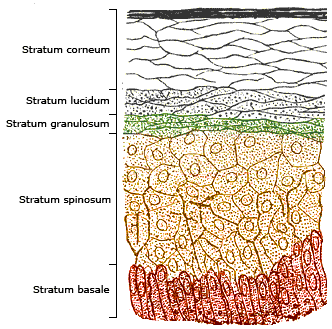
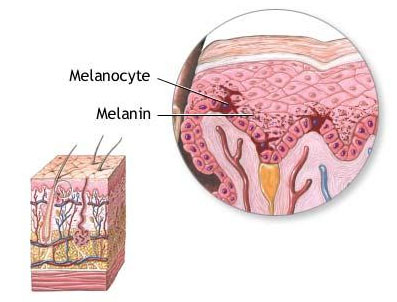
The layers of the epidermis (left). Melanocytes (rlght), located in the bottom epidermal layer, produce melanin.

PVA can be characterized by speckled, combined hyper- and hypopigmentation in the plaques or patches of affected skin. Hyperpigmentation is excess coloration, or darkening of the skin, while hypopigmentation is a diminished or pallid coloring to the skin. Pigmentation changes in PVA, apparent in the epidermal (outermost) skin layer, may be attributed to incontinence (leaking out) of melanin from melanocytes into the dermal skin layer below. Inflammation of the skin and cutaneous tissue, common with PVA, also contributes to color changes in the skin, typified by redness. Telangiectasia, the visible "vascular" element of PVA, is the dilation of small blood vessels near the skin surface. Skin atrophy, a wasting-away of the tissue comprising the skin, is a prominent part of PVA and effects the dermal, and particularly the epidermal layer. This, in part, is the result of degenerative liquefaction of the stratum basale (bottom cell-layer) of the epidermis. Atrophy of the skin gives it a thin, dry and wrinkled appearance, which in PVA-affected individuals has been described as "cigarette paper". Hyperkeratosis, a thickening of the stratum corneum (top cell-layer of the epidermis), has also been reported.

== Cause ==
PVA usually has an underlying cause, attributed to existing skin diseases and disorders associated with a cutaneous lymphoma or inflammation. Mycosis fungoides is the common lymphoma believed to cause PVA, although it may be considered a precursor when the lymphoma is occult (hidden) and undiagnosed. Large plaque parapsoriasis is another common causes of PVA. Less common causes include autoimmune-related connective tissue diseases such as lupus, dermatomyositis and scleroderma. Dermatoses and those that are genetically inspired, called genodermatoses, may also be an underlying cause of PVA. Among them, xeroderma pigmentosum and Rothmund–Thomson syndrome (poikiloderma congenita) are thought to be the most prominent. Ingestion of substances containing arsenic, such as arsphenamine, has also been suggested as a least common cause. PVA can also be idiopathic (of unknown cause), as seen in a small number of cases.

== Diagnosis ==
=== Classification ===
Poikiloderma vasculare atrophicans, or PVA, indicates that extra or altered skin pigmentation ("poikiloderma") is occurring, associated with heightened visibity of capillaries ("vasculare", referring to telangiectasia) under the skin, related to thinning and wasting away ("atrophicans") of the skin and its tissue. Telangiectasia is an enlargement of capillaries underneath the skin.

PVA also has common names that include parapsoriasis-related terminology (i.e. parapsoriasis variagata, or "variegated" parapsoriasis). Parapsoriasis is a term first used by Brocq in 1902, intended to represent a group comprising a number of uncommon skin disorders, under a once used, now antiquated classification scheme for all inflammatory dermatoses (skin diseases known to be associated with or cause inflammation). Brocq chose the term "parapsoriasis" to illustrate that the dermatoses placed in this group had or would have commonalities with psoriasiasis, including appearance and chronicity (lifelong or indefinite duration). This poorly designated grouping has led to confusion in establishing a nosology (a method of classifying diseases and disorders) that associated or distinguished these disorders, and through the years differing opinions and uses regarding parapsoriasis by both authors and physicians has caused further confusion. In more recent times, after much discussion and growing consensus, parapsoriasis and its terminology has been revisited and re-examined often. Newer thought on parapsoriasis, such as by Sutton (1956) all the way to that by Sehgal, et al. (2007) has cleared much of the confusion and has sparked increased understanding of parapsoriasis and its constituents.

PVA fits within this updated view of parapsoriasis as a syndrome often associated with large plaque parapsoriasis and, or including its variant form, retiform parapsoriasis. Additionally, it may be considered a precursor or variant of the lymphomatous skin disorder mycosis fungoides, which is also associated with large plaque parapsoriasis. Large plaque parapsoriasis consists of inflamed, oddly discolored (such as yellow or blue), web-patterned and scaling plaques on the skin, 10 cm (3.9 in) or larger in diameter. When the condition of the skin encompassed by these plaques worsens and becomes atrophic, it is typically considered retiform parapsoriasis. PVA can occur in either the large plaque or retiform stage, but it can only be considered PVA when its three constituents (poikiloderma, telangiectasia, atrophy) are present. PVA is therefore considered an independent syndrome identified by its constituents, wherever it occurs.

In modern consideration and usage, the solitary term "poikiloderma" has also come to represent all three elements of PVA. When skin diseases and disorders or skin conditions described as dermatoses contain the term poikiloderma in their assessment or diagnosis (such as with Bloom syndrome), this can sometimes be an erroneous usage of the term. Discretion has been advised. Usage of the entire term "poikiloderma vasculare atrophicans" may also be reserved to indicate it as the primary condition affecting the skin in cases where the disorder associated with it is secondary.

== See also ==
- List of cutaneous conditions
