= Cutis rhomboidalis nuchae =

- Specialty: Dermatology

Cutis rhomboidalis nuchae is a skin condition of the posterior neck, characterized by deep furrowing of the skin.

== See also ==
- List of cutaneous conditions
- Poikiloderma of Civatte
- Solar elastosis
