= Large plaque parapsoriasis =

- Other names: Parapsoriasis en plaques
- Specialty: Dermatology

Large plaque parapsoriasis are skin lesions that may be included in the modern scheme of cutaneous conditions described as parapsoriasis. These lesions, called plaques, may be irregularly round-shaped to oval and are 10 cm (4 in) or larger in diameter. They can be very thin plaques that are asymptomatic or mildly pruritic. Large-plaque parapsoriasis is a common associate of retiform parapsoriasis, can be accompanied by poikiloderma vasculare atrophicans, and can in rare occasions be a precursor to cutaneous T-cell lymphoma.

== Treatment ==
Parapsoriasis treatment consists primarily of light therapy (more specifically PUVA therapy or UVB therapy) possibly in combination with topical steroids. Large plaque parapsoriasis is usually a chronic condition that needs long-term treatment.

== See also ==
- List of cutaneous conditions
- Mycosis fungoides
