= Ushitaro Matsuura =

Japanese dermatologist and social activist (1865–1937)

- Born: November 2, 1865; Uki, Kumamoto, Japan
- Died: August 28, 1937 (aged 71)
- Occupations: Professor of Dermatology, Kyoto University and Crusader
- Known for: Naming of Pityriasis rotunda (Matsuura), (a skin disease) and Crusader against heavy drinking of alcohol and prostitution

Ushitaro Matsuura (松浦 有志太郎, Matsuura Ushitaro; November 2, 1865 – August 28, 1937) was a Japanese dermatologist at Kyoto Imperial University who, after retiring before the specified age of retirement, was engaged in a crusade against alcohol and prostitution. He named the disease pityriasis rotunda and his diagnosis is still being used today.

== Life ==
He was born as the 3rd son of Tetsuji Matsuura in Matsuai Mura, Uto gun, now Uki city, Kumamoto Prefecture. Between 1875 and 1880, he studied Han learning under Motosawa Fukuda and Bunki Morita. Later he studied German in Tokyo and entered the premedical course of Tokyo University. In 1888, he enter ed the Medical Faculty and in November 1892, he graduated from above with honors. In 1893, he worked in the Tokyo University. In May, 1885, he became the top surgeon at the Prefectural Kumamoto Hospital. In 1899, he studied in Germany and returned home in 1902. In December 1902, he was appointed Professor of Dermatology, Kyoto Imperial University. In 1918, at age 53, 7 years before the retirement age, he retired from Kyoto University and went into private practice. He concentrated in a crusade against alcohol and prostitution, the demerits of which he had been aware of professionally. Later, he recommended the use of brown rice for the prevention of beriberi. He lectured on the street or park starting in 1925, and for this purpose, he travelled even to Manchuria. In August 1937, he died of heart failure at age 71.

== Medicine ==
Pityriasis rotunda, a disease he named in 1906, can be found even today in Medline. In this disease, there are several round well marginated scaly lesions on the trunk. Matsuura was also interested in eczema, and discovered a medicine from rice bran called Pityrol for eczema, and he obtained American patent of pityrol which helped with his crusade. He verified the route of parasitism of Schistosoma japonicum using his body.

== Crusade against alcohol and prostitution ==
Morisada Hosokawa, the 17th lord of Hosokawa family of Higo, witnessed Ushitaro Matsuura addressing people in his campaign in Kyoto when Hosokawa was a student of Kyoto University. Matsuura's hair was half gray, and appeared like a farmer. He spoke against alcohol and prostitution, and recommended the use of brown rice for the prevention of beriberi, which was a big problem in Japan at that time. He even danced singing a campaign song when excited in his campaign.
