= PUVA keratosis =

Type of skin lesion

- Specialty: Dermatology

A PUVA keratosis is a precancerous keratotic skin lesion that arises from exposure to psoralen plus ultraviolet A light therapy.

== See also ==
- PUVA-induced acrobullous dermatosis
- List of cutaneous conditions
