= Pityriasis alba =

- Specialty: Dermatology

Pityriasis alba is a skin condition, a type of dermatitis, commonly seen in children and young adults as dry, fine-scaled, pale patches on the face. It is self-limiting and usually only requires use of moisturizer creams.

The condition is so named for the fine scaly appearance initially present (pityriasis), and alba (Latin for white) refers to the pallor of the patches that develop. The patches are not totally depigmented.

== Signs and symptoms ==
The dry scaling appearance is most noticeable during the winter as a result of dry air inside people's homes. During the summer, tanning of the surrounding normal skin makes the pale patches of pityriasis alba more prominent.

Individual lesions develop through 3 stages and sometimes are itchy:

1. Raised and red – although the redness is often mild and not noticed by parents
2. Raised and pale
3. Smooth flat pale patches

Lesions are round or oval raised or flat, of 0.5–2 cm in size although may be larger if they occur on the body (up to 4 cm), and usually number from 4 or 5 to over 20. The patches are dry with very fine scales. They most commonly occur on the face (cheeks), but in 20% appear also on the upper arms, neck, or shoulders.

The diagnostic differential should consider tinea and vitiligo amongst other causative factors.

== Cause ==
Any dermatitis may heal leaving pale skin, as may excessive use of corticosteroid creams used to treat episodes of eczema. The hypopigmentation is due to both reduced activity of melanocytes with fewer and smaller melanosomes.

The cause of pityriasis alba is not known. Dry skin and atopic dermatitis may co-exist. The patches may become more apparent after sun exposure, when the normal surrounding skin is tanned. The role of ultraviolet radiation, bathing or not bathing, low serum copper and Malassezia yeasts is not clear.

== Diagnosis ==
Diagnosis is mainly done by clinical examination. Shining a Wood's light over the skin may reveal further lesions not obviously visible otherwise.

== Differential diagnosis ==
- Pityriasis versicolor and leprosy.

== Treatment ==
No treatment is required and the patches in time will settle. The redness, scale and itch if present may be managed with simple emollients and sometimes hydrocortisone, a weak steroid, is also used.

As the patches of pityriasis alba do not darken normally in sunlight, effective sun protection helps minimise the discrepancy in colouration against the surrounding normal skin. Cosmetic camouflage may be required.

Tacrolimus has been reported as speeding resolution.

In exceptionally severe cases PUVA therapy may be considered.

== Prognosis ==
The patches of pityriasis alba may last from 1 month to about one year, but commonly on the face last a year. However it is possible that the white patches may last for more than 1 year on the face.

== Epidemiology ==
It occurs in mainly children and adolescents of all races, particularly people with dark skin. The worldwide prevalence is 5% in children, with boys and girls affected equally. adults can also have this disease.

Up to a third of US school children may at some stage have this condition. Single-point prevalence studies from India have shown variable rates from 8.4% to 31%. Other studies have shown prevalence rates in Brazil of 9.9%, Egypt 13.49%, Romania 5.1%, Turkey 12% where higher rates were seen in those with poor socioeconomic conditions, and just 1% in school children in Hong Kong. In 1963, one school health clinic reported features of pityriasis alba in two fifths of their children.

== History ==
It was first described in 1923. Having been known under a variety of names, the term 'Pityriasis alba', coined in 1956, has stayed.

== See also ==
- Leprosy
- List of cutaneous conditions
- Vitiligo which, by comparison, causes total loss of skin colour or on the face and tends to occur around the mouth and eyes.
