= Hereditary sclerosing poikiloderma =

- Other names: Hereditary sclerosing poikiloderma, Weary type
- This condition is inherited in an autosomal dominant manner.
- Specialty: Dermatology

Hereditary sclerosing poikiloderma is an autosomal dominant conditions with skin changes consisting of generalized poikiloderma appearing in childhood.

== See also ==
- Mandibuloacral dysplasia
- Poikiloderma
- Skin lesion
