= Pityriasis rubra pilaris =

- Other names: Devergie's disease, lichen ruber acuminatus, and lichen ruber pilaris
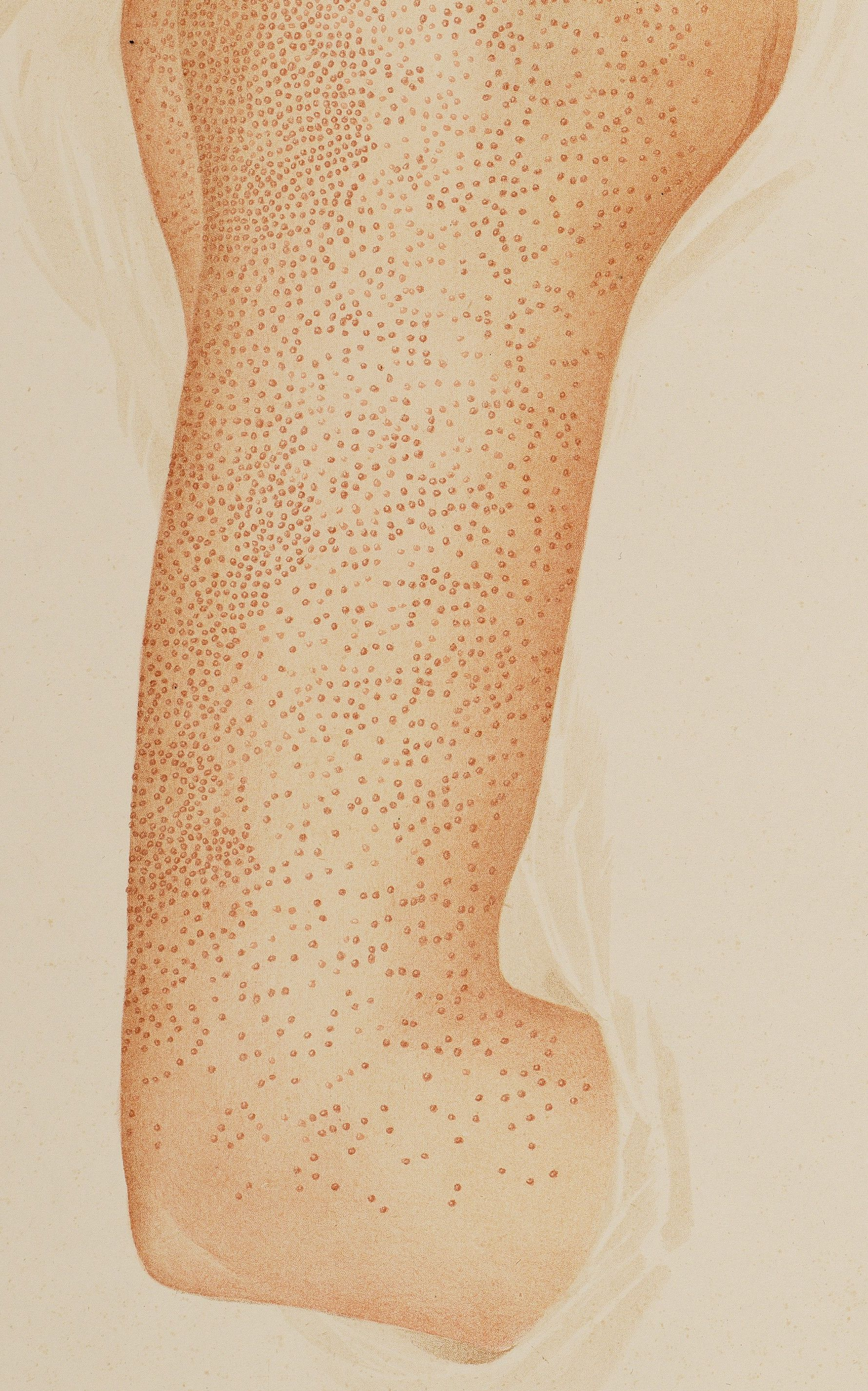
- Arm with pityriasis rubra pilaris
- Specialty: Dermatology
- Frequency: 0.0005%

Pityriasis rubra pilaris refers to a group of chronic disorders characterized by reddish orange, scaling plaques and keratotic follicular papules. Symptoms may include reddish-orange patches (Latin: rubra) on the skin, severe flaking (Latin: pityriasis), uncomfortable itching, thickening of the skin on the feet and hands, and thickened bumps around hair follicles (Latin: pilus for hair). For some, early symptoms may also include generalized swelling of the legs, feet and other parts of the body. PRP has a varied clinical progression and a varied rate of improvement. There is currently no known cause or cure for PRP.

It was first described by Marie-Guillaume-Alphonse Devergie in 1856, and the condition is also known as Devergie's disease.

== Diagnosis ==
=== Classification ===
Dr. W.A.D. Griffiths, from Great Britain, classified six forms of PRP in the early 1980s. At this time, the causes of PRP are still unknown and symptoms can be difficult to diagnose. Frequently, more than one medical professional will be consulted before an accurate PRP diagnosis is made.

Dermatologists have identified both an acquired form and an inherited form (familial) of PRP and have described them in medical journals. The acquired form usually shows a spontaneous or gradual remission of symptoms within several years although long-term symptoms may continue for years. The inherited form starts early in childhood with persistent long-term symptoms into adulthood.

Although most people who develop PRP are over age 50, individuals of any age, race, and nationality can be affected. Women and men seem to be equally affected.

== Treatment ==
Treatment with emollients is used to relieve symptoms of cracking and dryness. Application of lubricants under plastic occlusion before bedtime appears to aid removal of scales on hands and feet. Other topical options include: topical corticosteroids alone, or combined with keratolytics, such as urea and vitamin D3 analogues. The most effective therapy is long term use of oral retinoids, such as acitretin and isotretinoin. Other effective systemic approaches include: methotrexate, cyclosporin and corticosteroids. There are also reports that the monoclonal antibody ustekinumab (which blocks IL-23/ IL-12) may be effective.

== See also ==
- List of cutaneous conditions
