= Pityriasis lichenoides =

Pityriasis lichenoides et varioliformis acuta
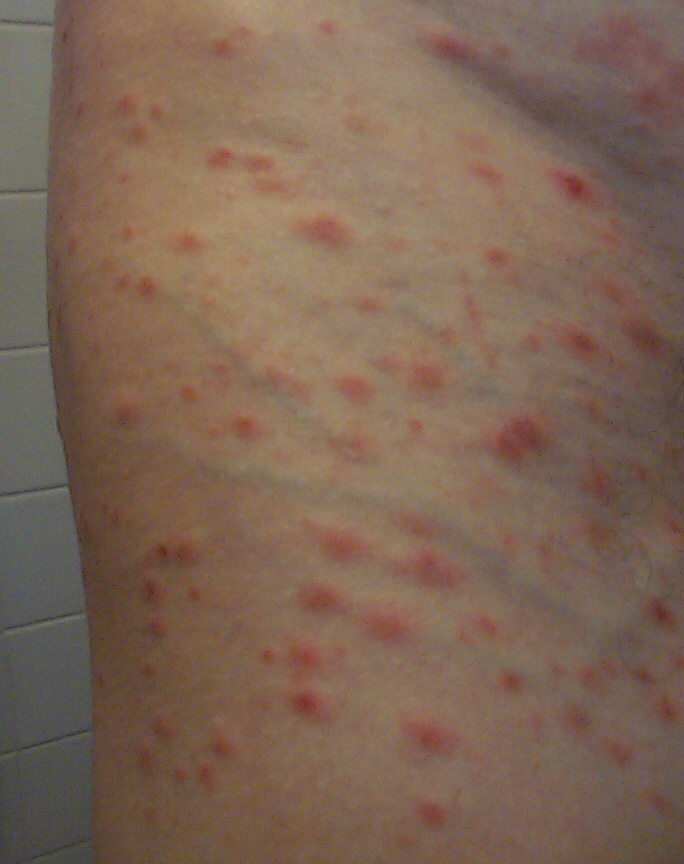
- Photo of the Pityriasis lichenoides et varioliformis acuta or Mucha–Habermann disease, showing the right leg
- Specialty: Dermatology

Pityriasis lichenoides represents a distinct subset of inflammatory skin disorders that includes pityriasis lichenoides chronica, febrile ulceronecrotic Mucha–Habermann disease, and pityriasis lichenoides et varioliformis acuta (PLEVA).

PLEVA typically manifests as an acute to subacute skin eruption of several tiny red papules that grow into polymorphic lesions. It may also leave behind varicella-like scars and hyper- or hypopigmentation sequelae.

Pityriasis lichenoides chronica (PLC) has very small reddish-brown flat maculopapules with a mica-like scale that appear more gradually; it also has long remission intervals between episodes of relapse.

Febrile ulceronecrotic Mucha–Habermann disease (FUMHD) is best treated as a dermatological emergency because it is an acute, severe, widespread eruption of purpuric and ulceronecrotic plaques that can have a 25% fatality rate and accompanying systemic involvement.

== Signs and symptoms ==
The characteristic feature of PLEVA is the rapid evolution of 2- to 3-mm-diameter erythematous macules into papules with a fine micaceous scale. The thicker the scale, the more frequently it breaks free at the edges while staying attached in the middle. The central punctum of the papule frequently develops into a vesiculopustular structure, experiences hemorrhagic necrosis, ulcerates, and is covered in reddish-brown crusts. There may be postinflammatory hyper- and hypopigmentation as well as varioliform scars. Pruritus and burning are among the symptoms. Although diffuse and widespread patterns can also occur, the trunk, extremities, and flexural areas are the most common sites for PLEVA to occur. Lesions can occur at any stage of development, making the eruption polymorphous. Subsequent crops of lesions can persist for weeks, months, or even years.

The rapid progression of necrotic papules to large coalescent ulcers with necrotic crusts, hemorrhagic bullae, and pustules distinguishes Febrile ulceronecrotic Mucha–Habermann disease from PLEVA. Both a secondary infection of the ulcers and a large, painful necrosis of the skin are possible. The mucosa of the mouth and genitalia may also be impacted. Atrophic scars and hypopigmentation are common after ulcer healing.

PLC presents with a far slower clinical course than both febrile ulceronecrotic Mucha–Habermann disease and PLEVA. Similar to PLC, the lesion begins as an erythematous papule that turns reddish-brown and is easily detached to reveal a shiny, pinkish-brown surface. The lesion also has a centrally adherent micaceous scale. In contrast to PLEVA and febrile ulceronecrotic Mucha–Habermann disease, the papule in question regresses and flattens on its own over a few weeks. Frequently, a hyper- or hypopigmented macule is left behind.

== Diagnosis ==
The clinical examination of the skin is used to diagnose and distinguish between the various forms of pityriasis lichenoides. For pityriasis lichenoides, a skin biopsy followed by a histopathologic examination is a confirmatory procedure. Histologically, interface dermatitis with a noticeable lymphocytic infiltrate is the hallmark of pityriasis lichenoides.
