= PUVA lentigines =

Type of skin condition

PUVA lentigines is a cutaneous condition caused by PUVA therapy.
