= Parapsoriasis =

- Specialty: Dermatology

Parapsoriasis refers to one of a group of skin disorders that are characterized primarily by their resemblance to psoriasis (red, scaly lesions), rather than by their underlying cause.

Neoplasms can develop from parapsoriasis. For example, it can develop into cutaneous T-cell lymphoma.

The word "parapsoriasis" was formed in 1902.

== Classification ==
The parapsoriasis groups, described and debated for nearly a century, has spawned a confusing nomenclature. There are some authors who prefer to limit the term "parapsoriasis" to large- and small-plaque variants only. However, the following classification scheme is now generally accepted:

- Large-plaque parapsoriasis
- Small-plaque parapsoriasis
- Pityriasis lichenoides
  - Pityriasis lichenoides chronica
  - Pityriasis lichenoides et varioliformis acuta
- Lymphomatoid papulosis

== See also ==
- Mycosis Fungoides
- Poikiloderma vasculare atrophicans
- List of cutaneous conditions
