= Vitiligo =

Skin condition where patches lose pigment

- Nonsegmental vitiligo of the hand
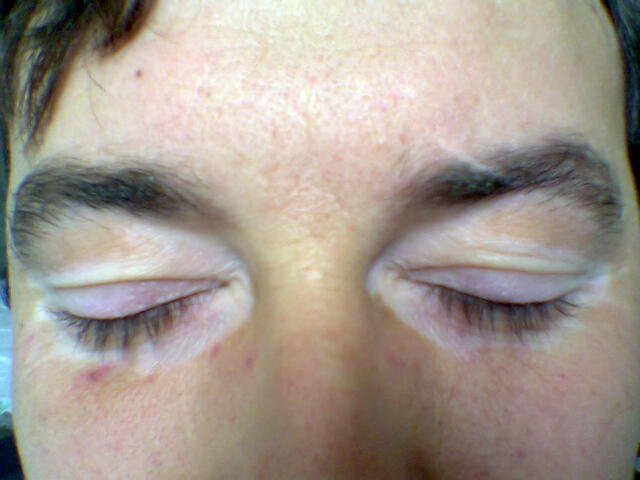
- Nonsegmental vitiligo of the eyelids
- Pronunciation: /ˌvɪtɪˈlaɪɡoʊ/ vi-ti-leye-goh
- Specialty: Dermatology
- Symptoms: Patches of white skin
- Usual onset: Childhood, young adult
- Duration: Long term
- Causes: Immune system changes with genetic factors
- Risk factors: Family history, other autoimmune diseases
- Diagnostic method: Tissue biopsy
- Treatment: Immunosuppressants, ultraviolet phototherapy (often with antioxidants or creams), and skin grafting
- Frequency: 0.1–2.1%

Vitiligo (/ˌvɪtɪˈlaɪɡoʊ/ VIT-ih-LY-goh) is a chronic autoimmune disorder that causes skin to lose pigment in patches that vary in size and can appear anywhere on the body. The result is the skin becomes light in colour.

The development of vitiligo is linked to aberrant attachments between melanocytes (which produce melanin) and laminins, an extracellular protein. The disorder is thought to be caused by immune system changes with potential genetic factors. Often first appearing by young adulthood, it may be triggered by environmental factors, sun or chemical exposure, stress, and physical trauma. The most common form tends to affect more skin over time. Potential treatments include topical immunosuppressants and ultraviolet light therapy, especially 311-nm UVB in combination with antioxidants. (Note: UVA carries a higher risk of skin cancer.)

In antiquity, the disorder was often conflated with leprosy, an infectious disease. Some public figures have had vitiligo, such as the singer Michael Jackson, who obscured his condition until it affected his entire body.

== Signs and symptoms ==
The only sign of vitiligo is the presence of pale, patchy areas of depigmented skin, which tend to occur on the extremities. Some people may experience itching before a new patch appears. The patches are initially small, but often grow and change shape. When skin lesions occur, they are most prominent on the face, hands, and wrists. The loss of skin pigmentation is particularly noticeable around body orifices, such as the mouth, eyes, nostrils, genitalia and umbilicus. Some lesions have increased skin pigment around the edges. Additionally, the hair of affected areas can turn white or gray due to the loss of melanin.

Those affected by vitiligo who are stigmatized for their condition may experience depression and similar mood disorders.

Vitiligo also appears in other mammals, being conspicuous for instance on Arabian horses.

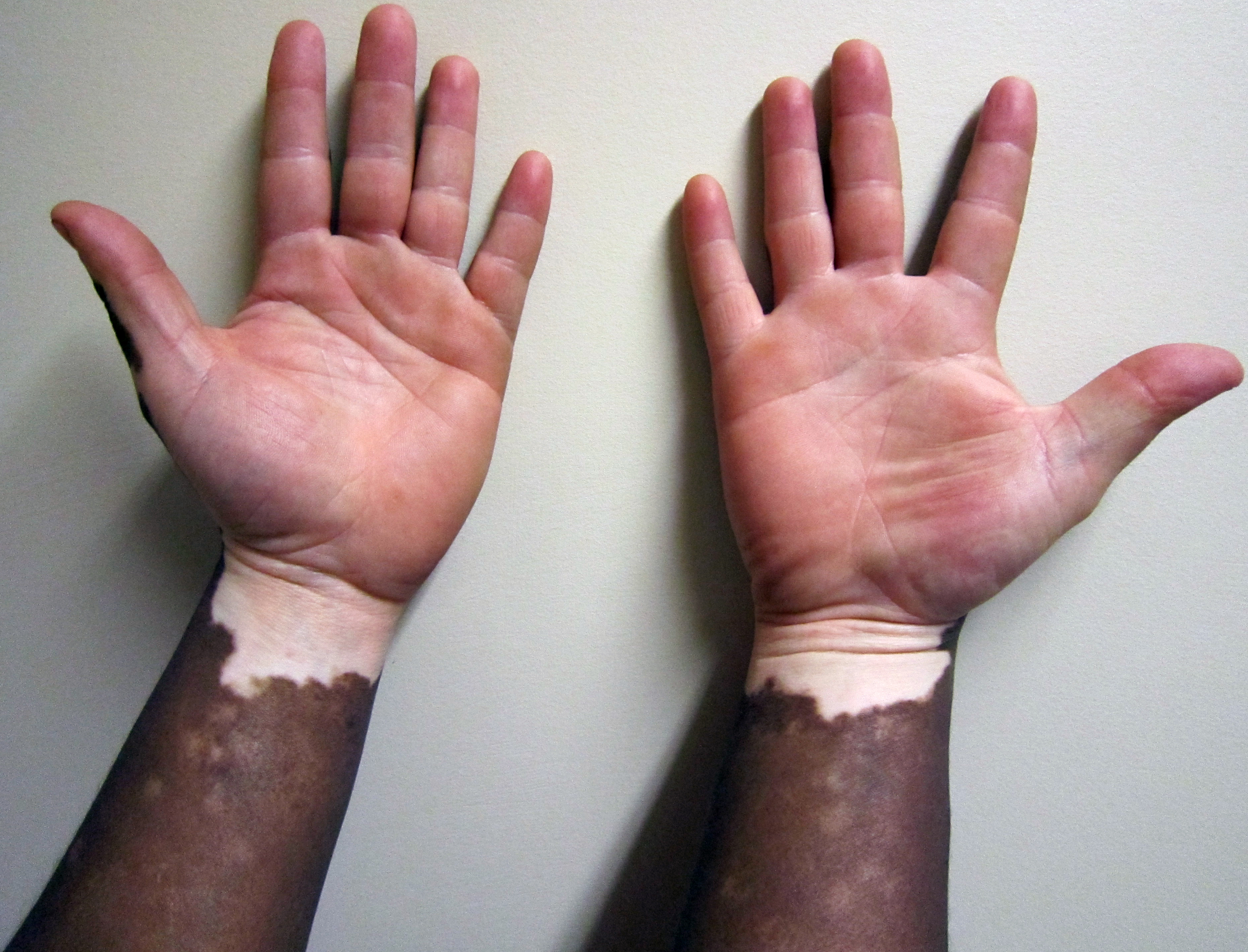
Nonsegmental vitiligo on dark skin, with the hands facing up

Vitiligo on lighter skin

== Causes ==
The development of vitiligo is linked to aberrant attachments between melanocytes (which produce melanin) and laminins, a kind of glycoprotein. When the basement membrane (the fibrous layer between cells and adjacent connective tissue) becomes enriched in laminin-332, melanocytes attach to that protein instead of the normal laminin-211 (via an integrin receptor instead of dystroglycan). Rather than disappearing, melanocytes appear to dedifferentiate and thus lose the ability to produce pigment, altering the actin cytoskeleton of affected cells.

Melanocyte loss may also be caused by the activation of the signaling pathway formed by Janus kinases (JAKs) and signal transducer and activator of transcription proteins (STATs), being triggered by T cells and creating a positive feedback loop with interferon-gamma (IFN-γ) chemokines (a form of cytokine signaling protein) secreted by keratinocytes, the primary cell type of the epidermis.

According to one study, segmental vitiligo (SV) is linked to the dysfunction of sympathetic nerves and demonstrates increased adrenoceptor responses in the affected areas as well as three times higher local blood flow. Meanwhile, a blood flow increase of about 1.5 times occurs in the more common nonsegmental vitiligo (NSV).

The disorder has occurred in recipients of bone marrow and lymphocytes from donors with vitiligo.

=== Immune system ===
Strong statistical evidence links vitiligo to changes in the immune system. It is thought to be caused by the immune system attacking and destroying melanocytes. Variations in genes expressed in immune cells or melanocytes have been associated with the disorder. A genome-wide association study found approximately 36 independent susceptibility loci for generalized vitiligo. One of them is the gene that encodes the protein tyrosinase, a melanocyte enzyme that catalyzes melanin biosynthesis and is a major autoantigen in generalized vitiligo.

It has been hypothesized that damaging environmental factors can disrupt redox reactions necessary for protein folding, so skin cells may initiate the unfolded protein response, which releases cytokines and thus triggers an immune response. Additionally, artificial sweeteners such as sucralose can make gut bacteria more aggressive, potentially damaging pigment-producing cells.

Vitiligo is sometimes associated with autoimmune and inflammatory diseases such as Hashimoto's thyroiditis, scleroderma, rheumatoid arthritis, type 1 diabetes mellitus, psoriasis, Addison's disease, pernicious anemia, alopecia areata, systemic lupus erythematosus, and celiac disease.

Among the inflammatory products of NLRP1 are caspase 1 and caspase 7, which activate the inflammatory cytokine interleukin-1β. Interleukin-1β and interleukin-18 are expressed at high levels in people with vitiligo. In one of the mutations, the amino acid leucine in the NALP1 protein was replaced by histidine (Leu155 → His). The original protein and sequence are highly conserved in evolution, and are found in humans, chimpanzees, rhesus monkeys, and bush babies. Addison's disease (typically an autoimmune destruction of the adrenal glands) may also be seen in individuals with vitiligo.

=== Environmental and physical factors ===
Susceptibility to vitiligo appears to be affected by region, especially early in life (e.g. a lack of exposure to microbes weakening the immune system). Most cases seem to start before the age of 20. Exposure to radiation and/or toxins, a sunburn, stress, and emotional distress can both trigger and exacerbate the condition. Existing cases of vitiligo may also be aggravated by temperature changes (causing dryness or sweating), poor hydration, or unprotected sun exposure.

Skin depigmentation can occur at the site of physical trauma, an example of the Koebner phenomenon; unlike in other skin diseases, this can be caused by daily activities, especially chronic friction on particular areas of the body. The phenomenon occurs in a third of patients with NSV but is rarely seen in SV.

Vitiligo may be a multifactorial disease, with environmental factors triggering preexisting genetic susceptibilities.

=== Oxidative stress ===
Numerous whole-exome sequencing studies have demonstrated that vitiligo is associated with polymorphisms in genes involved in the response to oxidative stress, supporting the association of elevated levels of reactive oxygen species in melanocytes with the induction of an autoimmune response. Thus, diseases presenting with altered mitochondrial function such as MELAS, Vogt–Koyanagi–Harada and Kabuki syndrome are associated with an increased risk of vitiligo.

In line with these observations, genetic alterations in mitochondrial DNA (mtDNA) of melanocytes associated with altered mitochondrial function lead to a release of mtDNA that can be detected in the skin of vitiligo patients. This mtDNA can be sensed by the cGAS–STING pathway, resulting in pro-inflammatory cytokine and chemokine production promoting the recruitment of cytotoxic T cells.

== Diagnosis ==
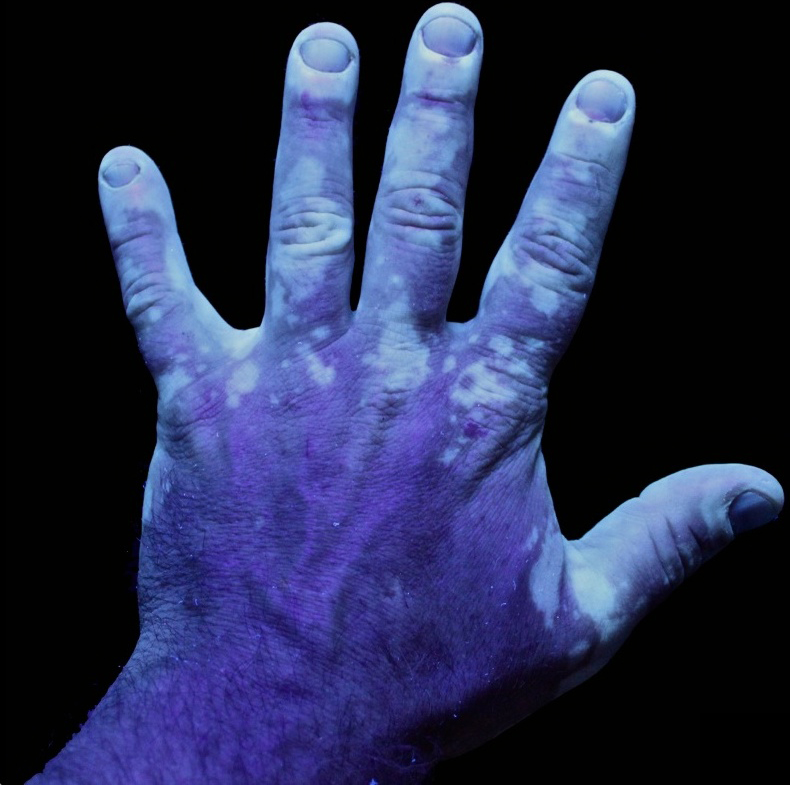
UV photograph of a hand with vitiligo

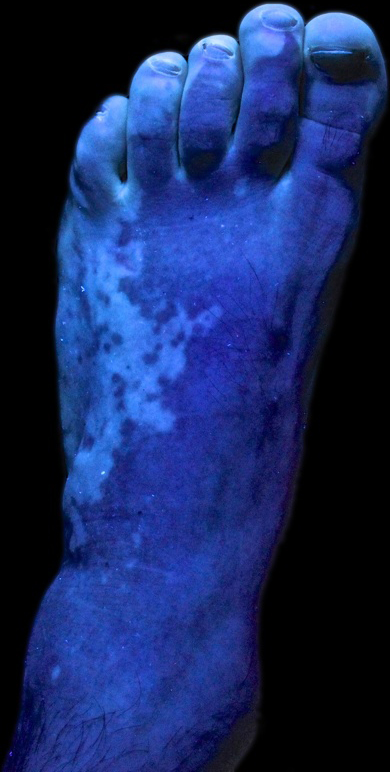
UV photograph of a foot with vitiligo

An ultraviolet light can be used in the early phase of this disease for identification and to determine the effectiveness of treatment. Under a Wood's light, skin will change colour (fluoresce) when it is affected by certain bacteria, fungi, and changes to pigmentation of the skin.

Past classifications of vitiligo have been somewhat inconsistent, but two forms are currently recognized.

=== Nonsegmental vitiligo ===
In NSV, there is usually a degree of symmetry in the location of depigmentation. It tends to affect more skin over time and can occur in patches or over large portions of the body. NSV can occur at any age (while segmental vitiligo usually first appears in teenagers).

Classes of nonsegmental vitiligo include the following:

- Generalized vitiligo: the most common pattern, wide and randomly distributed areas of depigmentation
- Universal vitiligo (vitiligo universalis): depigmentation encompasses most of the body
- Focal vitiligo: one or a few scattered macules in one area, most common in children
- Acrofacial vitiligo: fingers and periorificial areas
- Mucosal vitiligo: depigmentation of only the mucous membranes

=== Segmental vitiligo ===
SV differs in appearance, cause, and frequency of associated illnesses. It tends to affect areas of skin that are associated with dorsal roots from the spinal cord, is most often unilateral (affecting only one side of the body), tends to occur in youth, and stabilizes after a couple of years' progression. An autoimmune link, once believed not to characterize SV, has been discovered in recent research.

SV is highly resistant to medical treatment. Surgeries such as cellular grafting can be effective, but not while the disorder is active.

=== Differential diagnosis ===
Chemical leukoderma is a similar condition due to multiple chemical exposures. Vitiligo, however, is a risk factor. Triggers may include inflammatory skin conditions, burns, intralesional steroid injections, and abrasions.

Other conditions with similar symptoms include the following:

- Albinism
- Halo nevus
- Idiopathic guttate hypomelanosis (white sunspots)
- Piebaldism
- Pityriasis alba
- Postinflammatory hypopigmentation
- Primary adrenal insufficiency
- Progressive macular hypomelanosis
- Tinea versicolor
- Tuberculoid leprosy

=== Other associations ===
According to 2025 analysis, those with either vitiligo or melasma (in which pigment is increased) have an increased chance of developing the other condition.

A series of studies ending in early 2026 found that those with vitiligo had a statistically significant decreased incidence of squamous-cell carcinoma, a cancer that develops from the skin.

== Treatment ==
There is no cure for vitiligo but several treatment options are available, including topical medication and ultraviolet light, or a combination of the two, although phototherapy may pose a risk of skin cancer. According to one study, lesions on the hands, feet, and joints are the most difficult to repigment; those on the face are easiest to return to the natural skin color as the skin is thinner.

=== Topical applications ===
Topical preparations of immunosuppressing medications, including glucocorticoids (such as 0.05% clobetasol or 0.10% betamethasone) and calcineurin inhibitors (such as tacrolimus or pimecrolimus) are considered to be first-line treatments for vitiligo.

In July 2022, ruxolitinib cream (a Janus-kinas inhibitor sold under the brand name Opzelura) was approved for medical use in the United States for the treatment of vitiligo.

According to one study, there is moderate evidence that topical steroids have a positive effect.

=== Phototherapy ===
Phototherapy is considered a second-line treatment for vitiligo. Due to the higher risks of skin cancer with ultraviolet A (UVA) light, the United Kingdom's National Health Service suggests that it be used only if primary treatments are ineffective. The risk of skin cancer with UVB is unclear and commercially available lamps are not regulated, but 311 nm is considered the most effective wavelength, with the combined intake of antioxidant supplements believed to suppress oxidative stress.

UVA treatments are normally carried out in a hospital clinic. Psoralen and ultraviolet A light (PUVA) treatment involves taking a drug that increases the skin's sensitivity to ultraviolet light and then exposing the skin to high doses of UVA light. Treatment is required twice a week for 6–12 months or longer. Due to the high doses of UVA and psoralen, PUVA may cause side effects such as sunburn-type reactions or skin freckling.

Broadband ultraviolet B therapy is given three times a week. Narrowband ultraviolet B (NBUVB) phototherapy lacks the side effects caused by psoralens and is as effective as PUVA. Treatment is carried out 2–3 times weekly in a clinic. Longer treatment is often recommended over at least 6 months. The most effective responses are on the face and neck.

Topical calcineurin inhibitors plus phototherapy produces better results than phototherapy alone, hydrocortisone plus laser light is better than laser light alone, ginkgo biloba is better than placebo, and oral mini-pulse of prednisolone (OMP) plus NB-UVB is better than OMP alone. Additionally, a 2026 study found that oral intake of the antioxidant superoxide dismutase (coated by gliadin to protect its passage through the gut) seems to suppress oxidative stress during UV therapy.

=== Surgery ===
In October 1992, a study reported the successful transplantation of melanocytes to vitiligo-affected areas, effectively repigmenting the region. The procedure involved taking a thin layer of pigmented skin from the person's gluteal region. Melanocytes were then separated out to a cellular suspension that was expanded in culture. The area to be treated was then denuded with a dermabrader and the melanocytes graft applied. From 70–85% of people with vitiligo experienced nearly complete repigmentation of their skin, although the longevity of the repigmentation differed individually.

=== Cosmetic camouflage ===
In mild cases, vitiligo patches can be hidden with makeup or other cosmetic camouflage solutions. If the affected person is pale-skinned, the patches can be made less visible by avoiding tanning of unaffected skin.

=== Depigmentation ===
In cases of extensive vitiligo, the option to depigment the unaffected skin with topical medications, such as monobenzone, mequinol, or hydroquinone may be considered to even out skin tone. The removal of all the skin pigment with monobenzone is permanent and vigorous. Lifelong sun safety is required to avoid severe sunburn and melanomas. Depigmentation takes about a year to complete.

=== Other research ===
As of July 2013, afamelanotide was in phase II and III clinical trials for vitiligo and other skin diseases. A medication for rheumatoid arthritis, tofacitinib, has been tested for the treatment of vitiligo.

According to a 2021 review, JAK inhibitors like ruxolitinib show promise in targeting the IFN-γ-chemokine signaling axis implicated in vitiligo pathogenesis and improving NSV. In mid-2026, pharmaceutical corporation Pfizer announced positive phase III trial results of ritlecitinib, a kinas-inhibiting drug, to treat NSV. Additionally, a 2026 study published in The Lancet showed positive results with the JAK inhibitor upadacitinib.

As of 2024, mitochondrial antioxidants, NRF2 inhibitors, and TBK1 inhibitors were emerging as potential therapeutic options to block the effects of melanocytic mtDNA release associated with vitiligo.

The head of a 2025 Osaka Metropolitan University research team suggested that its discoveries, which included the presence of dormant pigment cells in vitiligo patches, could lead to new treatment approaches.

== History ==
Descriptions of a disease believed to be vitiligo date back to a passage in the Ebers Papyrus (c. 1500 BC), an ancient Egyptian medical text. Additionally, the Hebrew word "Tzaraath" from the Old Testament book of Leviticus (c. 1300 BC) described a group of skin diseases associated with white spots; a subsequent translation to Greek led to continued conflation of those with vitiligo with leprosy and spiritual uncleanliness.

Medical sources in the ancient world, such as Hippocrates, often did not differentiate between vitiligo and leprosy, grouping these diseases. The historical conflation of vitiligo with leprosy contributed to social stigma surrounding the condition in many societies, despite vitiligo being neither infectious nor physically disabling. The name "vitiligo" was first used by the Roman physician Aulus Cornelius Celsus in his classic medical text De Medicina.

The term vitiligo is believed to be derived from "vitium", meaning "defect" or "blemish".

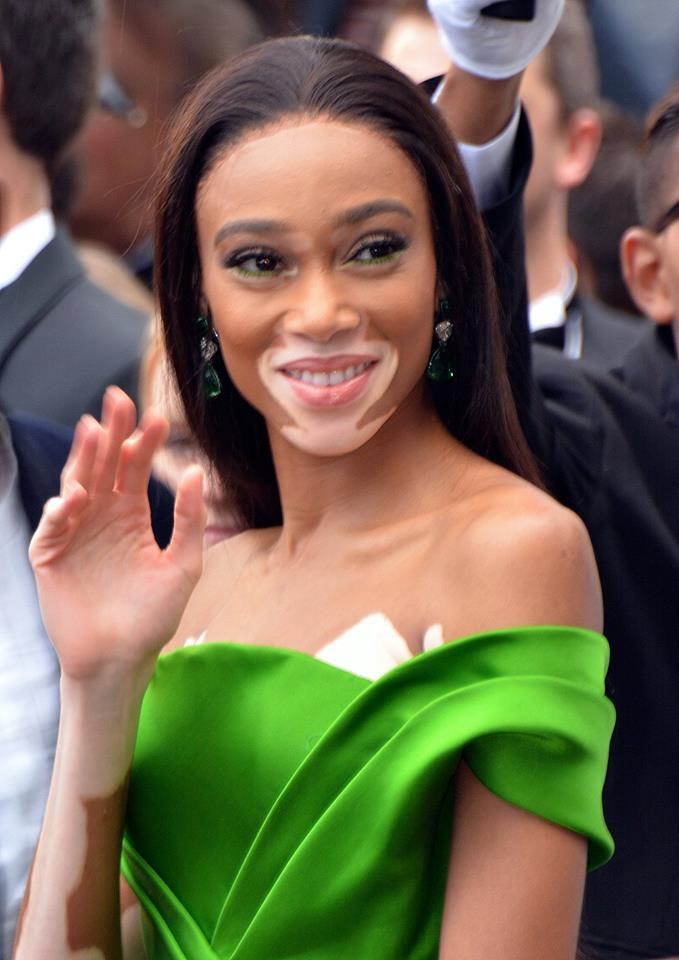
Winnie Harlow

== Society and culture ==
The altered appearance caused by vitiligo can affect a person's emotional and psychological well-being. It may lead to employment difficulties, particularly if vitiligo develops on visible areas of the body, such as the face, hands, or arms. Participating in a vitiligo support group may improve social coping skills and emotional resilience.

=== Notable people ===
The American pop singer Michael Jackson had the condition, which he obscured with costumes and makeup until it covered his body. This led to some inaccurate speculation that he had bleached his skin. Other notable cases include the American rapper Krizz Kaliko, the Canadian fashion model Winnie Harlow, the New Zealand singer-songwriter Kimbra, the American actor David Dastmalchian, the Argentine musician Charly García, the professional wrestler Bryan Danielson, the French actor Michaël Youn, the former French Prime Minister Édouard Philippe, Miss Universe Egypt 2024 Logina Salah, governor of Pampanga Eddie Panlilio, and the Colombian model Taliana Vargas.

=== In popular culture ===
The adult animated sitcom The Boondocks satirizes the idea of vitiligo in Uncle Ruckus, one of the show's characters. Ruckus, who is black, frequently claims to be white, often stating that he has "re-vitiligo, the opposite of what Michael Jackson had". He frequently uses this argument to maintain that he is actually white, leading him to commit delusional and racist antics.

== See also ==
- Chronic condition
