= Halo nevus =

- Other names: Leukoderma acquisitum centrifugum of sutton
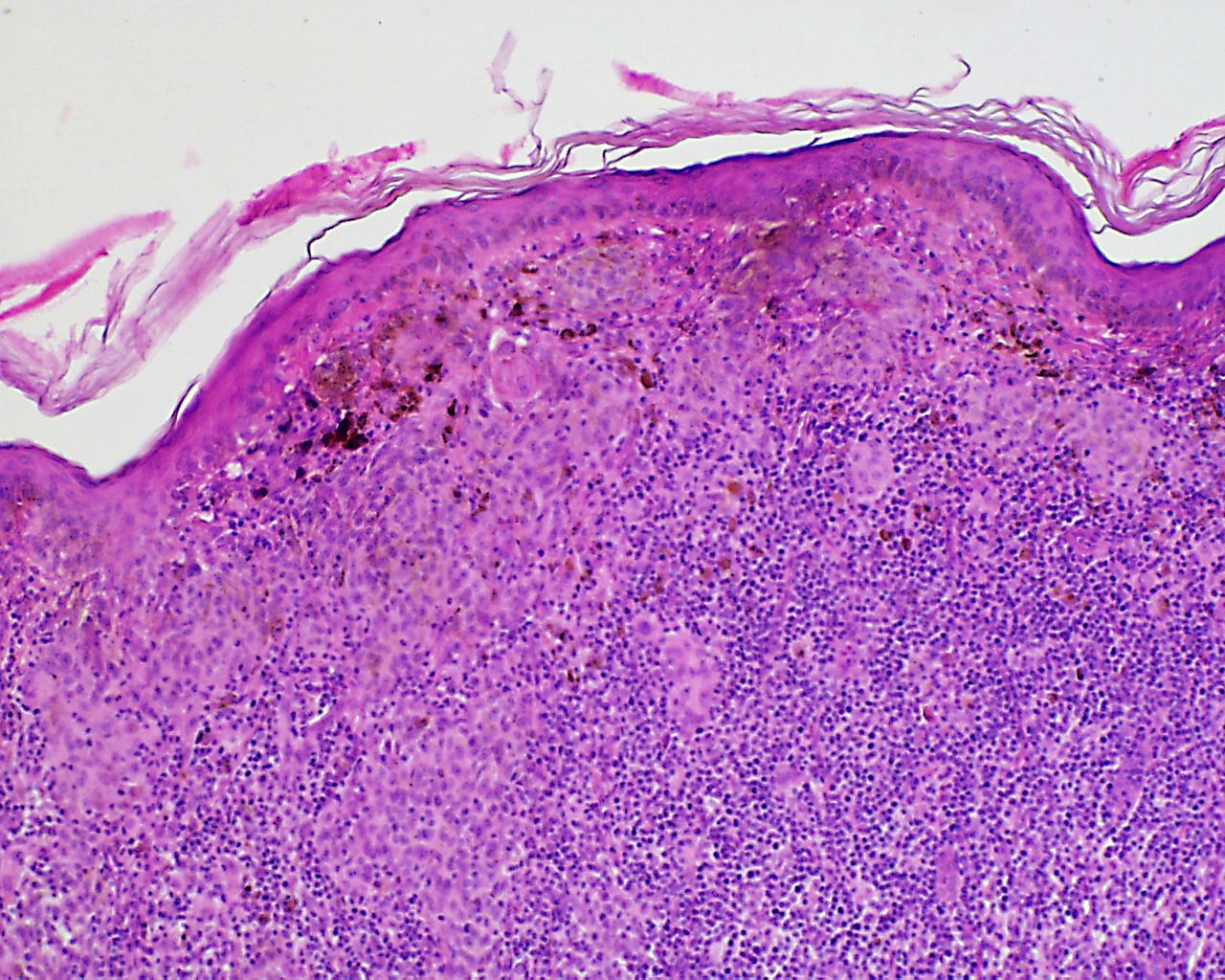
- Specialty: Dermatology

Halo nevus is a mole that is surrounded by a pale ring or 'halo'. It is generally noticed in the summer, when surrounding skin tans, and usually occurs on the chest, but can be anywhere. There may be one or, more typically, several. Onset is usually in teenagers and young adults. It typically follows a pattern of appearing at first as a dark mole surrounded by a halo before the nevus fades and disappears. A single halo-nevus-like lesion appearing in an older adult may be a melanoma.

It occurs in around 1% of the general population, and males and females are affected equally.

== Presentation ==
Halo nevi are also known as Sutton's nevi, or leukoderma acquisitum centrifugum. Halo nevi are named such because they are a mole (nevus) that is surrounded by an area of depigmentation that resembles a halo.

Halo nevi are associated with vitiligo. Sometimes the pale (hypopigmented) areas will spontaneously regress, and pigment returns.

== Causes ==
The formation of a halo surrounding a nevi is believed to occur when certain white blood cells called CD8+ T lymphocytes destroy the pigment-producing cells of the skin (melanocytes). The cause for the attack is unknown.

== Treatment ==
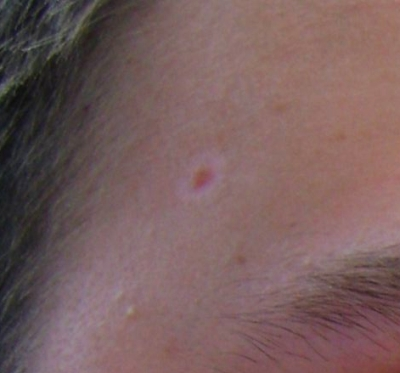
Photograph of a halo nevus on a face

As halo nevi are only of cosmetic significance, no treatment is required, and patients will be asymptomatic. Although halo nevi are harmless, it is important to monitor the lesion on a regular basis. Watch out for any changes in appearance of existing or new halo nevi. If there is any change in appearance or is associated with pain, itch, and infection, a doctor should be consulted immediately to exclude the possibility of melanoma.

== Epidemiology ==
Halo nevi are estimated to be present in approximately 1% of the general population and are found to be more prevalent in people with vitiligo, melanoma, or Turner syndrome. All races and sexes are equally susceptible to this disease, although a familial tendency has been reported. The average age of onset is in a person's teenage years.

== See also ==
- Nevus
- List of cutaneous conditions
