= Pityriasis lichenoides et varioliformis acuta =

- Other names: Acute guttate parapsoriasis, Acute parapsoriasis, Acute pityriasis lichenoides, Mucha–Habermann disease, Parapsoriasis acuta, Parapsoriasis lichenoides et varioliformis acuta, Parapsoriasis varioliformis)
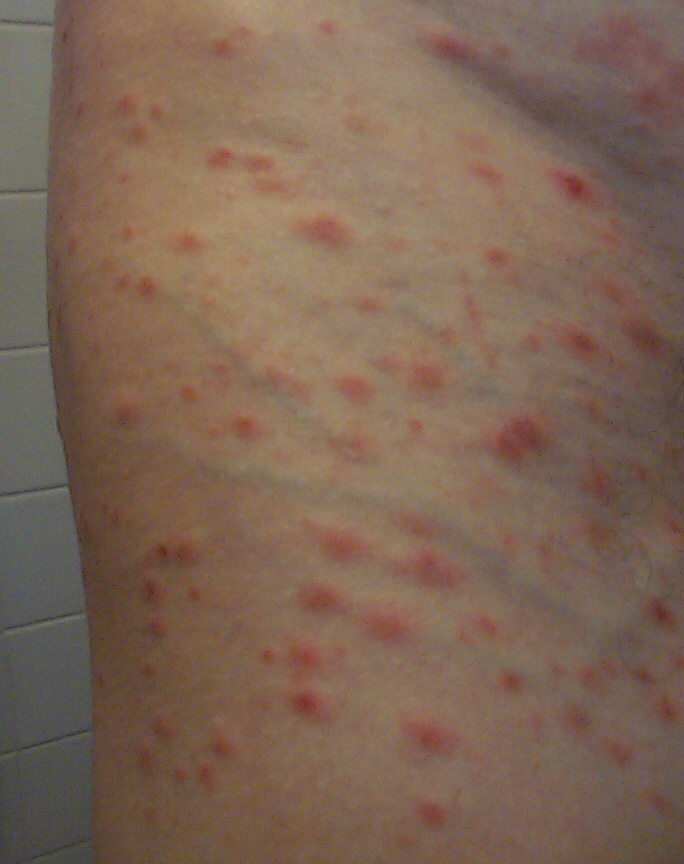
- Specialty: Dermatology

Pityriasis lichenoides et varioliformis acuta is a disease of the immune system. It is the more severe version of pityriasis lichenoides chronica. The disease is characterized by rashes and small lesions on the skin. The disease is more common in males and usually occurs in young adulthood, although it has been seen in every age group and every race. It is possible for the disease to go into remission for short periods of time or forever.

== Causes ==
There is no known cause of this disease; however, there is some evidence associating it with parvovirus B19.

== Diagnosis ==
It is commonly misdiagnosed as chickenpox or rosacea, or misidentified as a form of staphylococcal infection. The most accurate way to diagnose it is by biopsy. This disease has not been known to be life-threatening.

== Treatment ==
It is not contagious and currently there is no cure for the disease, although the lesions can be treated with phototherapy as well as antibiotics, including erythromycin, azithromycin and tetracycline. Treatment often involves multiple therapies that address the immune system and bacterial, viral, or dermatological causes.

== Eponym ==
Pityriasis lichenoides et varioliformis acuta is also known as Mucha–Habermann disease. It is named for Rudolf Habermann (1884–1941), a German dermatologist, and Viktor Mucha, an Austrian dermatologist.

== See also ==
- Cutaneous T-cell lymphoma
- Pityriasis lichenoides
- Parapsoriasis
- List of cutaneous conditions
