= Monobenzone =

Chemical compound

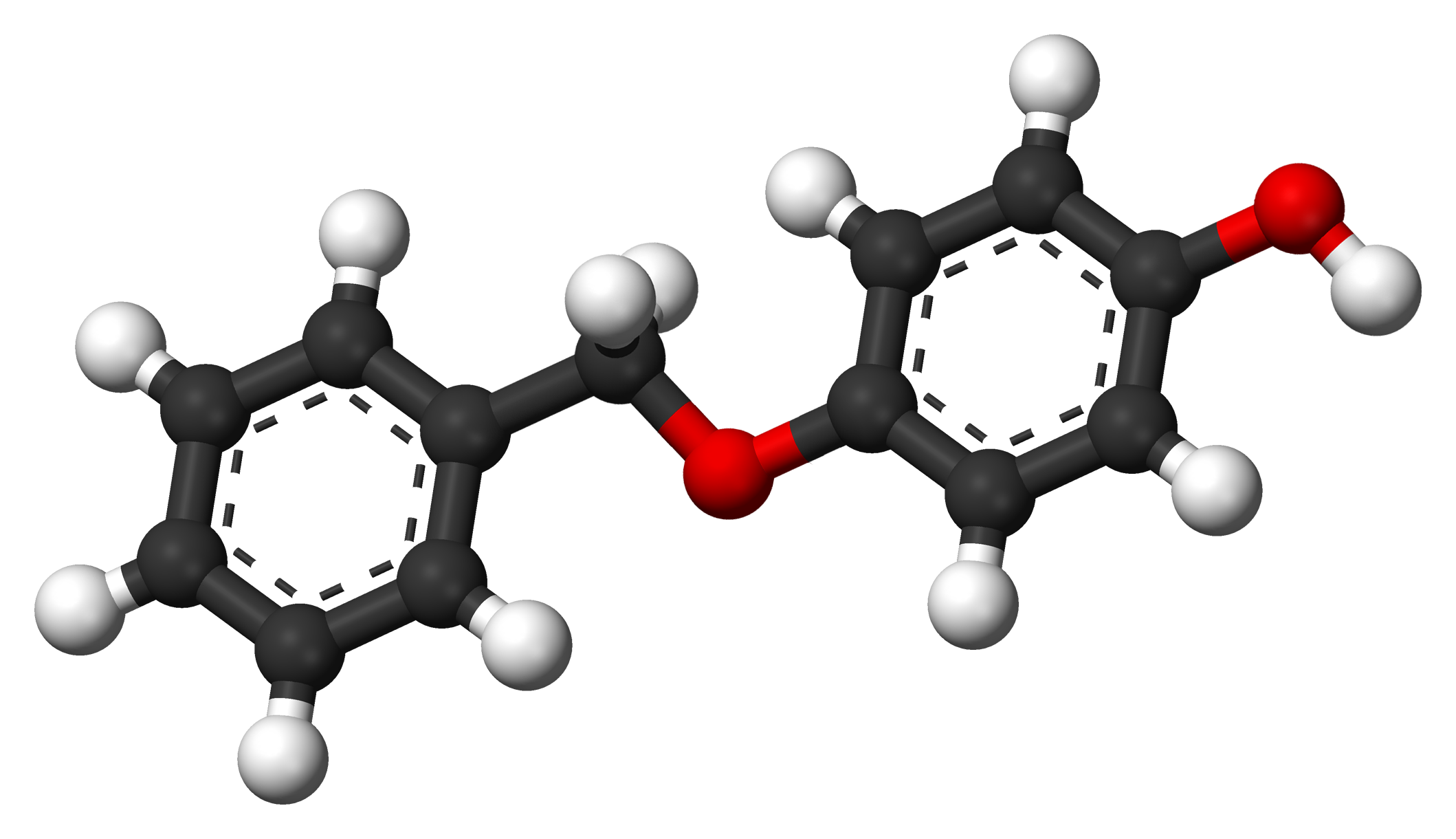

Clinical data
- Other names: Hydroquinone benzyl ether, Hydroquinone monobenzyl ether, Benzyl p-hydroxyphenyl ether, Benzyl hydroquinone, Benzoquin, 4-(phenylmethoxy)phenol
- AHFS/Drugs.com: International Drug Names
- Routes of administration: Topical
- ATC code: D11AX13 (WHO)

Legal status
- Legal status: CA: Unscheduled; US: ℞-only Unscheduled

Identifiers
- IUPAC name: 4-(benzyloxy)phenol
- CAS Number: 103-16-2
- PubChem CID: 7638
- IUPHAR/BPS: 6830
- DrugBank: DB00600
- ChemSpider: 7356
- UNII: 9L2KA76MG5
- KEGG: D05072
- ChEMBL: ChEMBL1388
- CompTox Dashboard (EPA): DTXSID2020717
- ECHA InfoCard: 100.002.804

Chemical and physical data
- Formula: C_{13}H_{12}O_{2}
- Molar mass: 200.237 g·mol^{−1}

Monobenzone, also called 4-(Benzyloxy)phenol and monobenzyl ether of hydroquinone (MBEH) is an organic chemical in the phenol family with chemical formula C_{6}H_{5}CH_{2}OC_{6}H_{4}OH. It is used as a topical drug for medical depigmentation. It is a colourless solid that is classified as the monobenzyl ether of hydroquinone. Monobenzone is soluble in alcohol, benzene, and diethyl ether, and practically insoluble in water.

== Pharmacology ==
The topical application of monobenzone in animals increases the excretion of melanin from melanocytes. The same action is thought to be responsible for the depigmenting effect of the drug in humans. Monobenzone may cause destruction of melanocytes and permanent depigmentation.

The histology of the skin after depigmentation with topical monobenzone is the same as that seen in vitiligo; the epidermis is normal except for the absence of identifiable melanocytes. Therefore, monobenzone is used as a topical medicine to permanently depigment normal skin surrounding vitiliginous lesions only in patients with disseminated (greater than 50 percent of body surface area) idiopathic vitiligo. Monobenzone is also being considered for the treatment of melanoma.
