= Papulosquamous disorder =

- Specialty: Dermatology

A papulosquamous disorder is a condition which presents with both papules and scales, or both scaly papules and plaques.

Examples include psoriasis, lichen planus, and pityriasis rosea.

== See also ==
- List of cutaneous conditions
