= Josef Engel (anatomist) =

Austrian anatomist (1816–1899)

Josef Engel (1816 in Vienna – 1899) was an anatomist from Austria-Hungary.

He was appointed professor of anatomy at Zürich in 1844 and later he became professor of physiology also. Five years afterward, he was appointed professor of pathological anatomy at the University of Prague. In 1854, he became professor of anatomy at the Josephsakademie (Josephinum), Vienna, in which position he remained until 1874. He made many important contributions to the systematization of anatomical science and its study.

== Works ==
His principal works are Lehrbuch der pathologischen Anatomie (“Textbook of pathological anatomy”), and Kompendium der topographischen Anatomie (“Compendium of topographical anatomy,” 1859).
