= PUVA therapy =

Ultraviolet light therapy treatment

- MeSH: D011701

PUVA (psoralen and UVA) is an ultraviolet light therapy treatment for skin diseases: vitiligo, eczema, psoriasis, graft-versus-host disease, mycosis fungoides, large plaque parapsoriasis, and cutaneous T-cell lymphoma, using the sensitizing effects of the drug psoralen. The psoralen is applied or taken orally to sensitize the skin, then the skin is exposed to UVA.

Photodynamic therapy is the general use of nontoxic light-sensitive compounds that are exposed selectively to light, whereupon they become toxic to targeted malignant and other diseased cells. Still, PUVA therapy is often classified as a separate technique from photodynamic therapy.

== Procedure ==
Psoralens are materials that make the skin more sensitive to UV light. They are photosensitizing agents found in plants naturally and manufactured synthetically. Psoralens are taken as pills (systemically) or can be applied directly to the skin, by soaking the skin in a solution that contains the psoralens. They allow UVA energy to be effective at lower doses. When combined with exposure to the UVA in PUVA, psoralens are highly effective at clearing psoriasis and vitiligo. In the case of vitiligo, they work by increasing the sensitivity of melanocytes, the cells that manufacture skin color, to UVA light. Melanocytes have sensors that detect UV light and trigger the manufacture of brown skin color. This color protects the body from the harmful effects of UV light. It can also be connected to the skin's immune response.

LED PUVA lamps give much more intense light compared to fluorescent type lamps. This reduces the treatment time, makes the treatment more effective, and enables the use of a weaker psoralen.

The physician and physiotherapists can choose a starting dose of UV based on the patient's skin type. The UV dose will be increased in every treatment until the skin starts to respond, normally when it becomes a little bit pink.

Normally the UVA dose is increased slowly, starting from 10 seconds and increased by 10 seconds a day, until the skin becomes a little bit pink. When the skin is little bit pink the time should be steady.

To reduce the number of treatments, some clinics test the skin before the treatments, by exposing a small area of the patient's skin to UVA, after ingestion of psoralen. The dose of UVA that produces redness 12 hours later, called the minimum phototoxic dose (MPD), or minimal erythema dose (MED) becomes the starting dose for treatment.

=== Comparison with narrowband UVB therapy ===
At least for vitiligo, narrowband ultraviolet B (UVB) nanometer phototherapy is now used more commonly than PUVA since it does not require the use of the psoralen and is easier to use with larger involved areas. As with PUVA, treatment is carried out twice per week in a clinic or every day at home, and there is no need to use psoralen.

Narrowband UVB therapy is less effective for the legs and hands, compared to the face and neck. To the hands and legs PUVA may be more effective. The reason can be because UVA penetrates deeper in the skin, and the melanocytes in the skin of the hands and legs are positioned deeper in the skin. Narrowband UVB 311 nanometer is blocked by the topmost skin layer, and UVA 365 nanometer reaches the melanocytes that are in the bottom skin layer.

Melanin is a dark pigment of the skin and the melanocytes produce it. The melanocytes produce melanin when their receptors detect UV light. The purpose of the melanin is to block UV light so that it will not cause damage to the body cells under the skin.

== Side effects and complications ==
For small spots of vitiligo, it is possible to use psoralen as drops, applied only on the spots. This method does not have side effects since the amount is very low.

For larger area, the psoralen is taken as a pill, and the amount is high (10 mg); some patients experience nausea and itching after ingesting the psoralen compound. For these patients PUVA bath therapy may be a good option.

Long term use of PUVA therapy with a pill has been associated with higher rates of skin cancer.

The most significant complication of PUVA therapy for psoriasis is squamous cell skin cancer. Two carcinogenic components of the therapy include the nonionizing radiation of UVA light as well as the psoralen intercalation with DNA. Both processes negatively contribute to genome instability.

== History ==
In Egypt around 2000 BC, the juice of Ammi majus was rubbed on patches of vitiligo after which patients were encouraged to lie in the sun. In the 13th century, vitiligo was treated with a tincture of honey and the powdered seeds of a plant called "aatrillal", which was abundant in the Nile Valley. The plant has since been identified as A. majus, which contains significant amounts of both bergapten and methoxsalen, two psoralen derivatives well known for their photosensitizing effects.

In the 1890s Niels Ryberg Finsen of Copenhagen developed a bulky phototherapy machine to treat skin diseases using UV light. In 1900, the French electrical engineer Gustave Trouvé miniaturized Finsen's machine with a series of portable light radiators to heal skin diseases such as lupus and epithelioma. Such machines have only been available in a chemically synthesized form since the 1970s.

In the 1940s, Abdel Monem El Mofty from Cairo University Medical School used crystalline methoxsalen (8-methoxypsoralen, also called xanthotoxin) followed by sunlight exposure to treat vitiligo. This began the development of modern PUVA therapy for the treatment of vitiligo, psoriasis, and other diseases of the skin.

== See also ==
- Goeckerman therapy
- PUVA lentigines
