= Goeckerman therapy =

Regimen for treatment of moderate to severe plaque psoriasis

Goeckerman therapy is a regimen for treatment of moderate to severe plaque psoriasis using a combination of crude coal tar and artificial ultraviolet radiation. It is a specialized form of light therapy.

First formulated in 1925 by American dermatologist William H. Goeckerman (1884–1954), Goeckerman therapy continues to be used due to its efficacy and safety profile. Individual institutions have modified the Goeckerman regimen and developed their own protocols. Standard therapy includes use of 2–4% crude coal tar in a petroleum base applied daily to the psoriatic plaques. The minimum period of time for tar application is 2-hours, although it has been recognized that greater periods of time produce better results. The patient is then exposed to broad-band ultraviolet B (UVB) radiation, although narrow-band UVB may also be used. Laboratory studies have shown that the combination of coal tar and UV light reduces epidermal DNA synthesis.

== Modifications ==
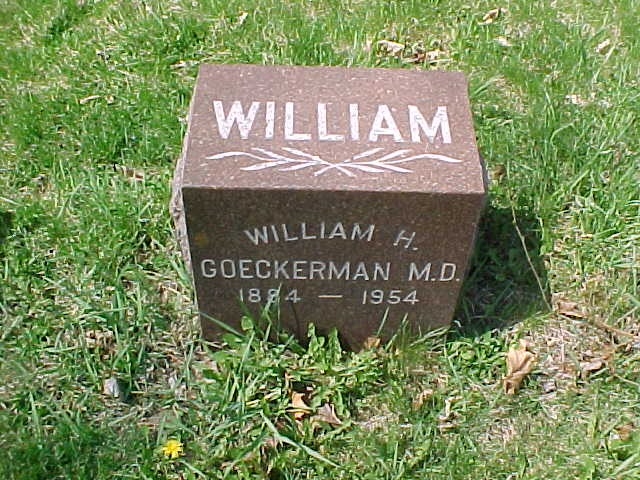
Headstone of William H. Goeckerman

In 1953, John Ingram, an English dermatologist, added topical anthralin paste to his Goeckerman regimen. This is known as the Ingram method.

== Cost ==
Recent publications have compared Goeckerman therapy with treatment with more expensive biologic agents. Historically, Goeckerman therapy was performed as an inpatient treatment. However, today the treatment can be done with reduced cost as an outpatient. It has been stated by de Miguel et al., that an annual three-week outpatient course of Goeckerman treatment costs $10,000 to 12,000 but repeat treatment may be extended to two years with the use of a $2,000 home UVB treatment lamp. The authors state that biologic therapy costs $22,000 to 59,000 per year.

== Safety ==
Goeckerman regimens use crude coal tar, which contains polycyclic aromatic hydrocarbon, a carcinogen. However, Goeckerman therapy is considered safe although use of tar may have the side-effects of contact dermatitis and mild local burning due to tar hypersensitivity. A retrospective study by Stern et al., of 1,373 patients concluded that there was an increase in skin cancers in those receiving repeated Goeckerman treatments compared to the control group. This has been refuted by other authors, including Pittelkow et al., who state there has not been an increase in skin cancers among those treated compared to the general population and Menter and Cran, who felt that the Stern study was too crude to have validity and felt a 10-year prospective study would be needed to confirm safety concerns.

== Efficacy ==
With the increased use of biologic medications in treatment of moderate-to-severe psoriasis there has been a shift away from Goeckerman therapy. A 2007 comparative study of psoriasis treatment found Goeckerman therapy to be more efficacious at 12-weeks than biologics. It has also been successfully used in patients who have failed some biologic therapies.
