= Pityriasis lichenoides chronica =

- Other names: Chronic guttate parapsoriasis, Chronic pityriasis lichenoides, Dermatitis psoriasiformis nodularis, Parapsoriasis chronica, Parapsoriasis lichenoides chronica
- Specialty: Dermatology
- Usual onset: It appears in crops. Erythematous scaly papules mixed with hyper or hypopigmented macules over trunk, limbs are seen. removal of scale reveals shiny brown surface underneath.
- Duration: can be chronic. lasting over weeks to months.
- Causes: Not known. previous bacterial or viral infection can be suspected.
- Diagnostic method: Clinical and morphological evaluation can be difficult. Skin biopsy from a scaly papule can be diagnostic.

Pityriasis lichenoides chronica is an uncommon, idiopathic, acquired dermatosis, characterized by evolving groups of erythematous, scaly papules that may persist for months.

== Symptoms and signs ==
Although other forms of the disease occur at younger ages, some individuals start having long term symptoms at thirty years of age. This disease also affects adolescents and young adults. This also affects the immune system which therefore results in rashes. The symptoms rarely affect the face or scalp, but occurs at other sites of the body. The duration may last for months or even several years. For instance, new crops of lesions appear every few weeks.

== Causes ==
Pityriasis lichenoides chronica is probably caused by a hypersensitivity reaction to infectious agents such as the Epstein–Barr virus. Other infectious agents include the adenovirus and Parvovirus B19.

== Treatment ==
There is no standard treatment for pityriasis lichenoides chronica. Treatments may include ultraviolet phototherapy, sun exposure, oral antibiotics, and corticosteroid creams and ointments to treat rash and itching. One study identified the enzyme bromelain as an effective therapeutic option for pityriasis lichenoides chronica.

== See also ==
- Cutaneous T-cell lymphoma
- Parapsoriasis
- Pityriasis lichenoides
- List of cutaneous conditions
