= Hypopigmentation =

Area of skin becoming lighter than the baseline skin color

- Hypopigmentation in vitiligo
- Specialty: Dermatology

Hypopigmentation is characterized specifically as an area of skin becoming lighter than the baseline skin color, but not completely devoid of pigment. This is not to be confused with depigmentation, which is characterized as the absence of all pigment. It is caused by melanocyte or melanin depletion, or a decrease in the amino acid tyrosine, which is used by melanocytes to make melanin. Some common genetic causes include mutations in the tyrosinase gene or OCA2 gene. As melanin pigments tend to be in the skin, eye, and hair, these are the commonly affected areas in those with hypopigmentation.

Hypopigmentation is common and approximately one in twenty have at least one hypopigmented macule. Hypopigmentation can be upsetting to some, especially those with darker skin whose hypopigmentation marks are seen more visibly. Most causes of hypopigmentation are not serious and can be easily treated.

== Presentation ==
=== Associated conditions ===
It is seen in:

- Albinism
- Idiopathic guttate hypomelanosis
- Leprosy
- Leucism
- Phenylketonuria
- Pityriasis alba
- Vitiligo
- Angelman syndrome
- Tinea versicolor
- Yaws
- An uncommon adverse effect of imatinib therapy
- Injections of high concentrations of corticosteroids (transient)

== Diagnosis ==
Areas of lighter pigmentation can be indications of hypopigmentation. Biopsies and genetic information are also used to diagnose.

== Treatments ==
Often, hypopigmentation can be brought on by laser treatments; however, the hypopigmentation can be treated with other lasers or light sources. Micropigmentation can also be used to obtain a more normal appearance of the hypopigmentated skin.

Treatment for hypopigmentation depends on the initial cause of the discoloration.

Treatments for Hypopigmentation
Initial Cause of Discoloration	Treatment
Idiopathic guttate hypomelanosis	No treatment
Postinflammatory hypopigmentation	Treat the underlying inflammatory disease to restore pigmentation
Pityriasis versicolor	A topical ointment, such as selenium sulfide 2.5% or imidazoles. Can also use oral medications, such as oral imidazoles or triazoles.
Vitiligo	Topical immunosuppressants, including calcineurin inhibitors. Patients can also have transplants if they are stable or a depigmentation with topical MBEH if the patient has widespread discoloration.
Chemical or drug induced leukoderma	Avoidance of causative agent with subsequent treatment similar to vitiligo.
Piebaldism	None; occasionally transplants.

== See also ==
- Hyperpigmentation
