= Idiopathic guttate hypomelanosis =

Acquired medical condition

- Other names: Leukopathia symmetrica progressiva
- Specialty: Dermatology
- Risk factors: Older age
- Diagnostic method: Appearance

Idiopathic guttate hypomelanosis is characterised by multiple small whitish flat spots. They are typically irregular, well defined and frequently appear on the arms, legs, and faces of older people.

It occurs in up to 80% of people over 70 years old. Females may notice it at a younger age than males.

== See also ==
- List of cutaneous conditions
- Skin lesion
