= Pityriasis amiantacea =

- Other names: Tinea amiantacea
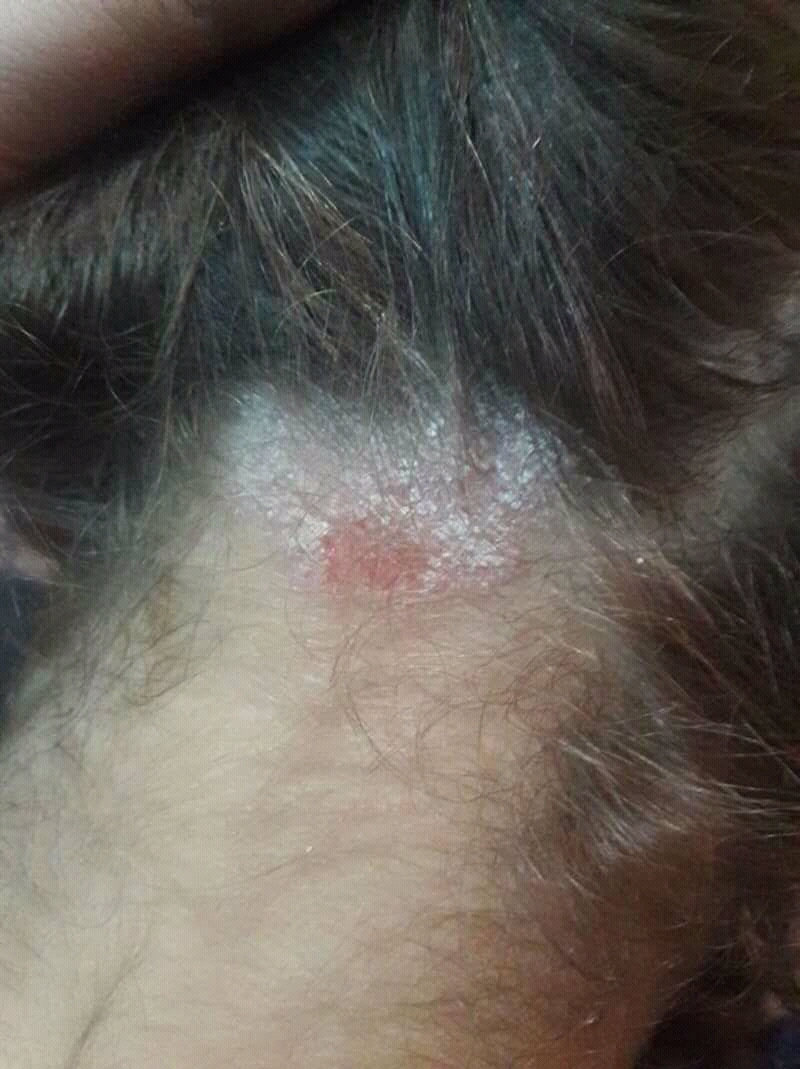
- Specialty: Dermatology

Pityriasis amiantacea is an eczematous condition of the scalp in which thick tenaciously adherent scale infiltrates and surrounds the base of a group of scalp hairs. It does not result in scarring or alopecia.

Pityriasis amiantacea was first described by Alibert in 1832. Pityriasis amiantacea affects the scalp as shiny asbestos-like (amiantaceus) thick scales attached in layers to the hair shaft. The scales surround and bind down tufts of hair. The condition can be localised or covering over the entire scalp. Temporary alopecia and scarring alopecia may occur due to repeated removal of hairs attached to the scale. It is a rare disease with a female predilection.

== Diagnosis ==
Pityriasis amiantacea can easily be misdiagnosed due to its close resemblance to other scalp diseases such as psoriasis, seborrhoeic dermatitis or lichen planus. However, in pityriasis amiantacea the scales are attached to both the hair shaft and the scalp. Pityriasis amiantacea may be present with other inflammatory conditions such as atopic dermatitis or seborrhoeic dermatitis and sebaceous scales and alopecia can occur. According to Bolognia's textbook "Dermatology," this rare condition is most often combined with psoriasis, but it may also develop as secondarily infected atopic dermatitis, seborrheic dermatitis, and/or tinea capitis.

== Treatment ==
The bacteria staphylococci are present in the majority of cases. Treatment with systemic antibiotics and coal tar shampoo can completely clear the condition when Staphylococcus aureus bacteria are found. Fungal infections such as tinea capitis are known to mimic the symptoms of the condition and can be cleared with antifungal treatment.

== See also ==
- List of cutaneous conditions
