= Ernst Finger =

Austrian dermatologist

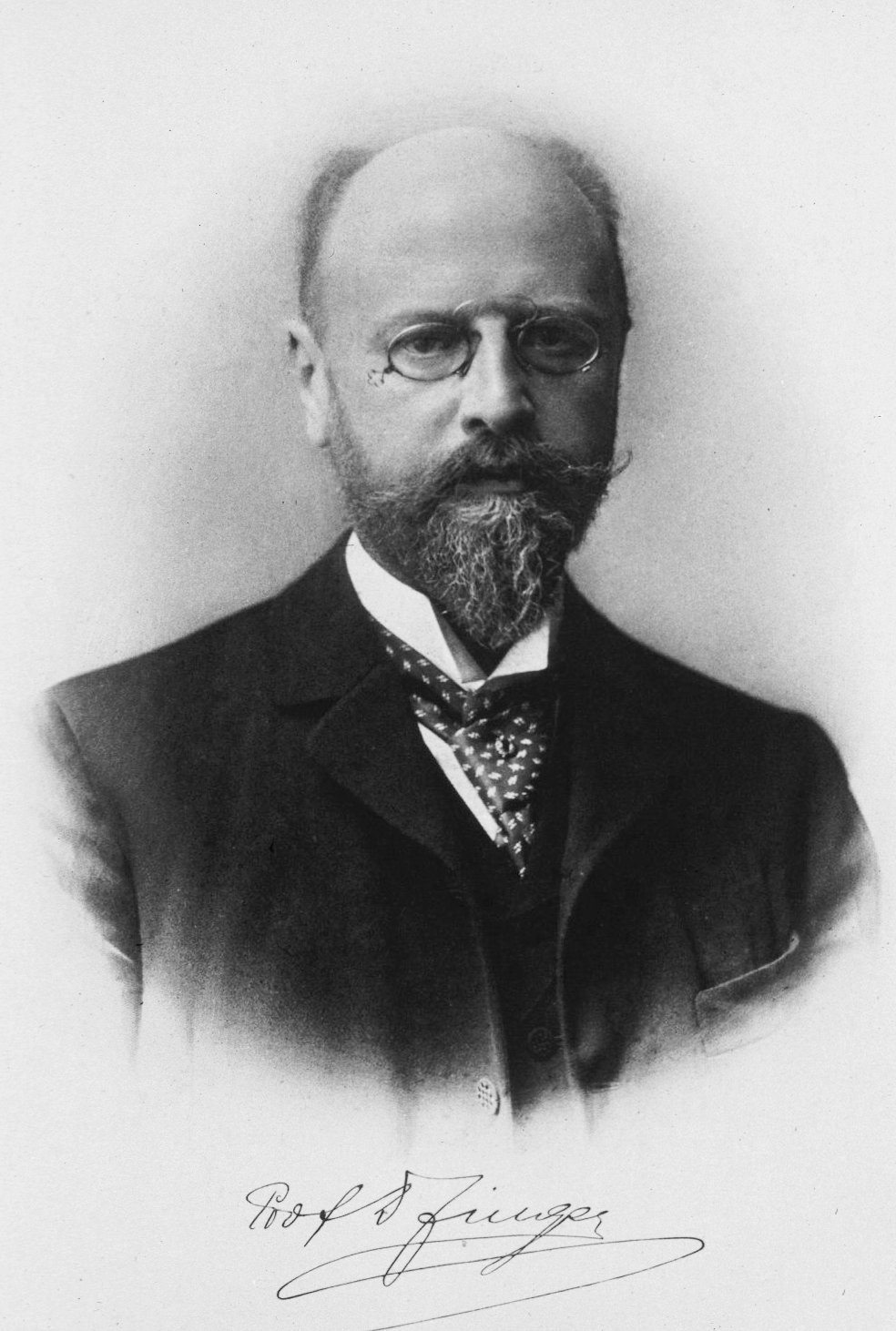
Ernst Finger

Ernst Anton Franz Finger (name also spelled Ernest; 8 July 1856 – 17 April 1939) was an Austrian dermatologist born in Prague. He was a leading authority regarding venereal disease.

In 1878 he obtained his medical doctorate at the University of Vienna, and later was an assistant to Hermann Edler von Zeissl (1817–1884) and Isidor Neumann (1832–1906) at the Vienna clinic of skin diseases and syphilis. Beginning in 1883 he worked as a privat-docent of dermatology, becoming an associate professor in 1894. From 1904 to 1927 he served in Vienna as director of the second department of dermatology and sexually transmitted diseases.

He was the author of the highly regarded Die Blennorrhoe der Sexualorgane und ihre Complicationen (Blennorrhea of the sexual organs and associated complications), a book that was published in several editions, and also Die Vererbung der Syphilis, a book that was an edition of Jean Alfred Fournier's work on congenital syphilis. Other noted works by Dr. Finger include.

- Die Syphilis und die venerischen Krankheiten (Syphilis and venereal diseases), (three editions 1886–1896).
- Die Pathologie und Therapie der Sterilität beim Manne (The pathology and treatment of sterility in men); (1898).

From 1906 to 1919 he was president of the Wiener Ärztekammer (Vienna Medical Association), and from 1925 to 1931, he served as president of the Obersten Sanitätsrates (Supreme Health Council).
