= Pityriasis rotunda =

- Other names: Pityriasis circinata, tinea circinata
- Specialty: Dermatology

Pityriasis rotunda is a disorder of keratisation of the skin that manifests as a perfectly circular, scaly patches on the torso and proximal portions of the extremities. It may be associated with diseases like hepatocellular carcinoma in racially predisposed groups.

== See also ==
- Skin lesion
- List of cutaneous conditions
- Ushitaro Matsuura
