= Α-Arbutin =

Glycoside

α-Arbutin

Names
- IUPAC name 4-Hydroxyphenyl-α-d-glucopyranoside
- Systematic IUPAC name (2R,3S,4S,5R,6R)-2-(hydroxymethyl)-6-(4-hydroxyphenoxy)oxane-3,4,5-triol
- Other names: α-arbutin; Hydroquinone-O-α-d-glucopyranoside; 4-Hydroxyphenyl α-d-gluco-hexopyranoside

Identifiers
CAS Number	84380-01-8
3D model (JSmol)	Interactive image
Beilstein Reference	89675
ChEMBL	ChEMBL226495
ChemSpider	139552
DrugBank	DB14109
ECHA InfoCard	100.103.679
EC Number	440-470-8/617-561-8
KEGG	C12079
PubChem CID	158637
UNII	72VUP07IT5
CompTox Dashboard (EPA)	DTXSID20233358
- InChI: InChI=1S/C12H16O7/c13-5-8-9(15)10(16)11(17)12(19-8)18-7-3-1-6(14)2-4-7/h1-4,8-17H,5H2/t8-,9-,10+,11-,12+/m1/s1 Key: BJRNKVDFDLYUGJ-ZIQFBCGOSA-N
- SMILES: C1=CC(=CC=C1O)O[C@@H]2[C@@H]([C@H]([C@@H]([C@H](O2)CO)O)O)O

Properties
Chemical formula	C_{12}H_{16}O_{7}
Molar mass	272.25
Melting point	201 °C (394 °F; 474 K)
Boiling point	285 °C (545 °F; 558 K) at 102.17 kPa
Solubility in water	151 g/L
log P	2.05×10^{−2}
UV-vis (λ_{max})	280 nm

Pharmacology
ATC code	D11 (WHO)
Routes of administration	Topically
- Pharmacokinetics
Bioavailability	0.53% percutaneous absorption
Legal status	US: Not FDA approved; EU: Unscheduled

Hazards
- Occupational safety and health (OHS/OSH)
Ingestion hazards	Harmful
Eye hazards	Mild irritant
Skin hazards	Non-irritant
- GHS labelling
Pictograms	(GHS07: Exclamation mark)
Signal word	Warning
Hazard statements	H302
NFPA 704 (fire diamond)	0 1 0

Related compounds
Related compounds	Arbutin (β-Arbutin); γ-Arbutin
- Except where otherwise noted, data are given for materials in their standard state (at 25 °C [77 °F], 100 kPa). Infobox references

α-Arbutin, is a glycosylated hydroquinone, and an anomer of the naturally occurring arbutin. α-Arbutin is used in the cosmetic and pharmaceutical industries for its skin lightening effects, treatment of hyperpigmentation, and as a safer alternative to hydroquinone.

== Properties and synthesis ==
α-Arbutin is a synthetic substance that can be produced by enzymatic glycosylation of hydroquinone in the presence of α-amylase and dextrin. In one example, this has been done in recombinant Escherichia coli, using amylase of Bacillus subtilis and sucrose phosphorylase of Leuconostoc mesenteroides.

Structurally it is the α-anomer of arbutin (β-arbutin), and like the β-form it is an enzyme inhibitor of human tyrosinase.

== Uses ==
α-Arbutin is used in the cosmetic and pharmaceutical industries for its skin lightening effects, treatment of hyperpigmentation, and as a possibly safer alternative to hydroquinone. It may also possess antioxidant properties, which can protect the skin from free radical damage.

It is used in products aimed at fading solar lentigo, freckles, melasma, and other forms of hyperpigmentation where excess melanin is a concern, providing a more even skin complexion. For this purpose, concentrations of up to 2% α-arbutin are found in face creams and serums and 0.5% in body creams.

α-Arbutin showed a significant reduction in melanin synthesis in cultured human melanoma cells and a three-dimensional human skin model, with melanin synthesis reduced to 40% of the control, indicating its potency as a skin lightening agent without affecting cell viability.

== Mechanism of action ==
α-Arbutin's mechanism of action as a skin lightening agent is primarily through the competitive enzymatic inhibition of tyrosinase, leading to a decrease in melanin production without affecting the mRNA gene expression of tyrosinase. It is more potent an inhibitor of tyrosinase than arbutin.

α-Arbutin directly inhibits the enzymatic activity of tyrosinase, which is essential for melanin synthesis. Tyrosinase catalyzes the first two steps in melanin production: the hydroxylation of tyrosine to l-DOPA and the oxidation of l-DOPA to dopaquinone. By inhibiting tyrosinase, α-arbutin reduces the formation of melanin in melanocytes.

α-Arbutin does not affect the gene expression of tyrosinase mRNA. This means that while α-arbutin inhibits the activity of the tyrosinase enzyme, it does not decrease the enzyme's production at the genetic level.

This reduction in melanin leads to lighter skin tones and can help in the treatment of hyperpigmentation disorders. The efficacy of α-arbutin in reducing melanin synthesis was demonstrated in cultured human melanoma cells and a three-dimensional human skin model, where it effectively reduced melanin synthesis.

== Safety and regulation ==
α-Arbutin is generally considered safe for topical application in cosmetic products. However, its usage concentrations in the European Union (EU) are restricted by the European Commission Scientific Committee on Consumer Safety to 2% in facial creams and 0.5% in body lotions.
