= Arbutin =

Glycoside

Names
- IUPAC name 4-Hydroxyphenyl-β-d-glucopyranoside
- Systematic IUPAC name (2R,3S,4S,5R,6S)-2-(Hydroxymethyl)-6-(4-hydroxyphenoxy)oxane-3,4,5-triol
- Other names: beta-Arbutin; β-Arbutin; Arbutoside; Hydroquinone β-d-glucopyranoside; 4-Hydroxyphenyl β-d-gluco-hexopyranoside

Identifiers
CAS Number	497-76-7
3D model (JSmol)	Interactive image
Beilstein Reference	89673
ChEBI	CHEBI:18305
ChEMBL	ChEMBL232202
ChemSpider	389765
DrugBank	DB11217
ECHA InfoCard	100.007.138
EC Number	207-850-3
KEGG	C06186
MeSH	Arbutin
PubChem CID	346
RTECS number	CE8663000
UNII	C5INA23HXF
CompTox Dashboard (EPA)	DTXSID7040152
- InChI: InChI=1S/C12H16O7/c13-5-8-9(15)10(16)11(17)12(19-8)18-7-3-1-6(14)2-4-7/h1-4,8-17H,5H2/t8-,9-,10+,11-,12-/m1/s1 Key: BJRNKVDFDLYUGJ-RMPHRYRLSA-N; Key: BJRNKVDFDLYUGJ-RMPHRYRLBW
- SMILES: C1=CC(=CC=C1O)O[C@H]2[C@@H]([C@H]([C@@H]([C@H](O2)CO)O)O)O

Properties
Chemical formula	C_{12}H_{16}O_{7}
Molar mass	272.25
Appearance	Colorless to white solid powder
Melting point	197–201 °C (387–394 °F; 470–474 K)
Solubility in water	5.0 g/100 mL
Solubility	slightly soluble in ethyl ether, benzene and chloroform
Solubility in ethanol	soluble
log P	–1.35
Vapor pressure	2.3×10^{−12} mm Hg (25 °C)
Acidity (pK_{a})	10.10
UV-vis (λ_{max})	285 nm

Pharmacology
ATC code	D11 (WHO)
Routes of administration	Topically
- Pharmacokinetics
Bioavailability	0.53% percutaneous absorption
Legal status	US: Not FDA approved; EU: Unscheduled

Hazards
- Occupational safety and health (OHS/OSH)
Ingestion hazards	Low level of toxicity
Eye hazards	Irritation
Skin hazards	Irritation
- GHS labelling
Pictograms	(GHS07: Exclamation mark)
Signal word	Warning
Hazard statements	H315, H319, H335
NFPA 704 (fire diamond)	0 1 0
- Lethal dose or concentration (LD, LC)
LD_{50} (median dose)	9.8 g/kg (mouse, oral), 8.7 g/kg (rat, oral), 978 mg/kg (rat, mouse, dermal) (maximum practically applicable dosage)
Safety data sheet (SDS)	Sigma-Aldrich

Related compounds
Related compounds	α-Arbutin; γ-Arbutin
- Except where otherwise noted, data are given for materials in their standard state (at 25 °C [77 °F], 100 kPa). verify (what is ?) Infobox references

β-Arbutin, also known by its International Nomenclature of Cosmetic Ingredients (INCI) name, arbutin, is a glycosylated derivative of hydroquinone. It is naturally present in the leaves and bark of a variety of plants, notably the bearberry plant, Arctostaphylos uva-ursi.

It is an active ingredient in topical treatments for hyperpigmentation. Its skin lightening mechanism of action involves inhibiting the activity of tyrosinase, an essential enzyme for melanin synthesis in the human skin.

It is an anomer of α-arbutin, which has a similar skin lightening effect.

== Properties ==
Arbutin is a compound where a glucose molecule, specifically d-glucose, is chemically bound to hydroquinone. In aqueous solutions, glucose can exist in one of three stereoisomeric forms: α, β, or γ, with the β-anomer being the predominant form. The standard known form of arbutin, β-Arbutin, has a molecular formula of C_{12}H_{16}O_{7} and a molecular weight of 272.25 g/mol. Its stereoisomers, α-arbutin and γ-arbutin, share the same molecular formula and weight but are distinct in their atoms' spatial arrangement.

β-Arbutin is soluble in water, presenting typically as a white powder that remains stable under standard storage conditions. It exhibits stability in both ethanol and water and demonstrates resistance to light exposure. When dissolved in water, β-arbutin may undergo hydrolysis, converting to hydroquinone, which can subsequently oxidize to benzoquinone.

α- and β-Arbutin do not interconvert easily (epimerize). They are stable in water and methanol without buffer or stabilizer, and no epimerization was observed in any of the tested conditions.

== Occurrence and preparation ==
The compound is naturally occurring and can be extracted from several plant species. Traditionally extracted from the bearberry plant (Arctostaphylos uva-ursi), it also occurs in high levels in plants in the families of Ericaceae and Saxifragaceae. Others include the pear (Pyrus spp.), and certain species of wheat. It is also found in very small quantities in Viburnum opulus, Bergenia crassifolia and Schisandra chinensis.

It was first isolated from Arctostaphylos uva-ursi in 1852 using the lead subacetate method. It was named "arbutin" because at the time, Arctostaphylos uva-ursi was classified as Arbutus uva-ursi. Its structure was discovered by synthesis in 1912.

Synthetically, it can also be prepared from the reaction of acetobromoglucose and hydroquinone in the presence of an alkali.

== Uses ==
The main application of β-arbutin is in the cosmetic industry, where it is incorporated into various skin care products, including creams, serums and lotions, aimed at lightening skin tone and correcting hyperpigmentation. Its efficacy and safety profile make it a sought-after ingredient for products targeting solar lentigo, freckles, melasma, and other forms of hyperpigmentation.

In cosmetics, it is considered safe at concentration up to 7% in face creams, provided that the contamination of hydroquinone in the cosmeticformulations remains below 1 ppm. Hydroquinone itself is a skin bleaching agent.

=== Herbal medicine ===
For centuries, β-arbutin has been used in phytotherapy, or herbal medicine. Extracted from the leaves of bearberry plants, it is used as a mixture with other herbal drugs as a treatment for urinary tract infections.

== Mechanism of action ==
=== Regulation of melanin synthesis ===
β-Arbutin acts as an enzyme inhibitor of cellular tyrosinase by inactivating it. Tyrosinase is an enzyme needed in melanin synthesis in the melanin producing cell of the skin, the melanocyte. By reducing the activity of tyrosinase, β-arbutin reduces the synthesis of melanin, leading to a lighter skin tone and the diminished appearance of hyperpigmentation. It is not as potent an inhibitor of tyrosinase as α-arbutin.

It has also been shown act as a substrate for tyrosinase. Tyrosinase catalyses the hydroxylation of tyrosine, an amino acid, to l-DOPA (levodopa) and the oxidation of d-DOPA to dopaquinone which is then further metabolised to melanin. β-Arbutin is thought to have structural similarities to the substrate tyrosine, and this may inhibit the activity of tyrosinase.

=== Decomposition into hydroquinone ===
Conflicting evidence shows that β-arbutin may also work by being decomposed into hydroquinone. If this occurs, the amount of hydroquinone created by decomposition would be small and its contribution to inhibiting the creation of melanin as small.

== Safety and regulation ==
β-Arbutin is generally considered safe for topical application in cosmetic products. However, its usage concentrations in the European Union (EU) are restricted by the European Commission Scientific Committee on Consumer Safety to 7% in facial creams, provided the contamination of hydroquinone remains below 1 ppm.

=== Skin-lightening agent ===
Bearberry extract is used in skin lightening treatments designed for long term and regular use. An active agent in brands of skin lightening preparations, it is more expensive than traditional skin lightening ingredients like hydroquinone, which is now banned in many countries. In vitro studies of human melanocytes exposed to arbutin at concentrations below 300 μg/mL reported decreased tyrosinase activity and melanin content with little evidence of cytotoxicity.

==== Risks ====
Arbutin is glucosylated hydroquinone, and may carry similar cancer risks, although there are also claims that arbutin reduces cancer risk. The German Institute of Food Research in Potsdam found that intestinal bacteria can transform arbutin into hydroquinone, which creates an environment favorable for intestinal cancer.

== See also ==
- Ferulic acid
- Taxifolin
