= C12H16O7 =

The molecular formula C_{12}H_{16}O_{7} may refer to:

- α-Arbutin
- β-Arbutin
