= Decapaptide-12 =

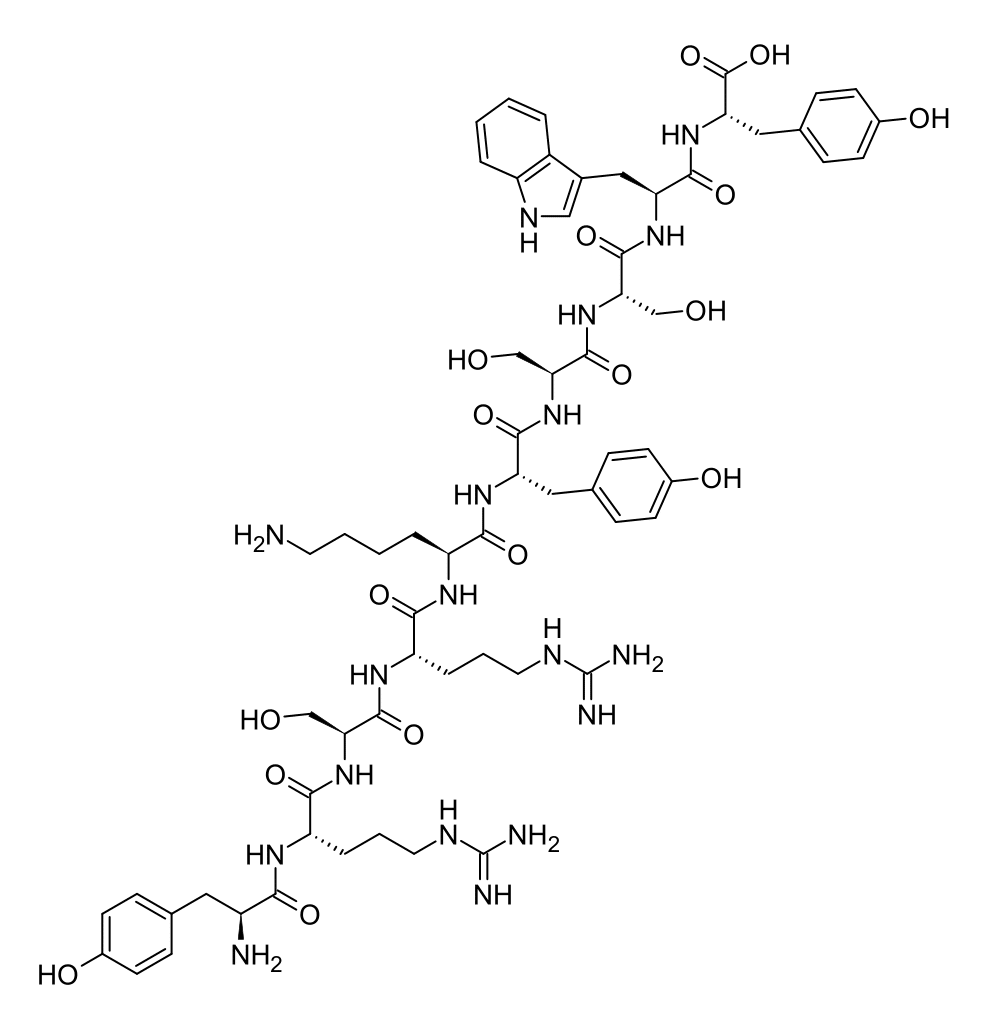

Identifiers
- IUPAC name: (2S)-2-[[(2S)-2-[[(2S)-2-[[(2S)-2-[[(2S)-2-[[(2S)-6-amino-2-[[(2S)-2-[[(2S)-2-[[(2S)-2-[[(2S)-2-amino-3-(4-hydroxyphenyl)propanoyl]amino]-5-(diaminomethylideneamino)pentanoyl]amino]-3-hydroxypropanoyl]amino]-5-(diaminomethylideneamino)pentanoyl]amino]hexanoyl]amino]-3-(4-hydroxyphenyl)propanoyl]amino]-3-hydroxypropanoyl]amino]-3-hydroxypropanoyl]amino]-3-(1H-indol-3-yl)propanoyl]amino]-3-(4-hydroxyphenyl)propanoic acid
- CAS Number: 137665-91-9
- PubChem CID: 25077748
- ChemSpider: 17310554

Chemical and physical data
- Formula: C_{65}H_{90}N_{18}O_{17}
- Molar mass: 1395.544 g·mol^{−1}
- 3D model (JSmol): Interactive image
- SMILES: C1=CC=C2C(=C1)C(=CN2)C[C@@H](C(=O)N[C@@H](CC3=CC=C(C=C3)O)C(=O)O)NC(=O)[C@H](CO)NC(=O)[C@H](CO)NC(=O)[C@H](CC4=CC=C(C=C4)O)NC(=O)[C@H](CCCCN)NC(=O)[C@H](CCCN=C(N)N)NC(=O)[C@H](CO)NC(=O)[C@H](CCCN=C(N)N)NC(=O)[C@H](CC5=CC=C(C=C5)O)N
- InChI: InChI=1S/C65H90N18O17/c66-24-4-3-9-45(76-55(91)47(11-6-26-73-65(70)71)77-60(96)51(32-84)81-57(93)46(10-5-25-72-64(68)69)75-54(90)43(67)27-35-12-18-39(87)19-13-35)56(92)78-48(28-36-14-20-40(88)21-15-36)58(94)82-53(34-86)62(98)83-52(33-85)61(97)79-49(30-38-31-74-44-8-2-1-7-42(38)44)59(95)80-50(63(99)100)29-37-16-22-41(89)23-17-37/h1-2,7-8,12-23,31,43,45-53,74,84-89H,3-6,9-11,24-30,32-34,66-67H2,(H,75,90)(H,76,91)(H,77,96)(H,78,92)(H,79,97)(H,80,95)(H,81,93)(H,82,94)(H,83,98)(H,99,100)(H4,68,69,72)(H4,70,71,73)/t43-,45-,46-,47-,48-,49-,50-,51-,52-,53-/m0/s1; Key:OYVFAMLECFSFEI-XJHNTGDTSA-N

Decapaptide-12 (Lumixyl) is a synthetic 10-amino acid peptide with the sequence YRSRKYSSWY or Tyr-Arg-Ser-Arg-Lys-Tyr-Ser-Ser-Trp-Tyr, which acts to inhibit the synthesis of melanin by blocking the enzyme tyrosinase. It has been investigated for medical uses in treatment of hyperpigmentation disorders such as melasma, and has also been sold off-label as a skin-lightening product.

== See also ==
- Hydroquinone
- Melanotan II
