= Skin lightening in Ghana =

== History of Skin Lightening ==
The practice of skin lightening and bleaching is a lucrative industry in Ghana, where a higher marital value and societal/economic privilege, is placed upon a woman's complexion. This phenomenon has been present since the sixteenth century and was influenced by contemporary practices, and it is an ongoing controversial topic. White skin asserted class privilege and distinct racial privilege, prompting many Ghanaians to bleach their skin to achieve a similar color. Skin bleaching is a practice where women and men use various chemicals and cosmetic products to attempt to lighten or whiten the color of the skin.The practice of skin bleaching has caused controversy due to the negative side effects to the central nervous system and kidneys. These products often contain one or both of two chemicals: hydroquinone and mercury and can sometimes lead to negative physical effects, such as cancer and can cause rash and flaky skin, as well as uneven light and dark patches on the skin.There are two forms of Mercury; inorganic mercury is the purest and most toxic agent that is heavily used in countries that are closer to the equator and raw mercury that is not as strong and it is commonly used in countries further away from the equator. The use of mercurial preparations to the skin is a contemporary practice passed down from Greek and Roman traditions whom used Mercury to develop skin bleaching cosmetics. Although Mercury is commonly used as a skin lightening agent it is toxin that can be used in traditional Asian medicines/remedies, cultural and religious practices, and can be used as a preservative in some vaccines.

== Skin Lightening's Influence on the Marriage Market in Ghana ==
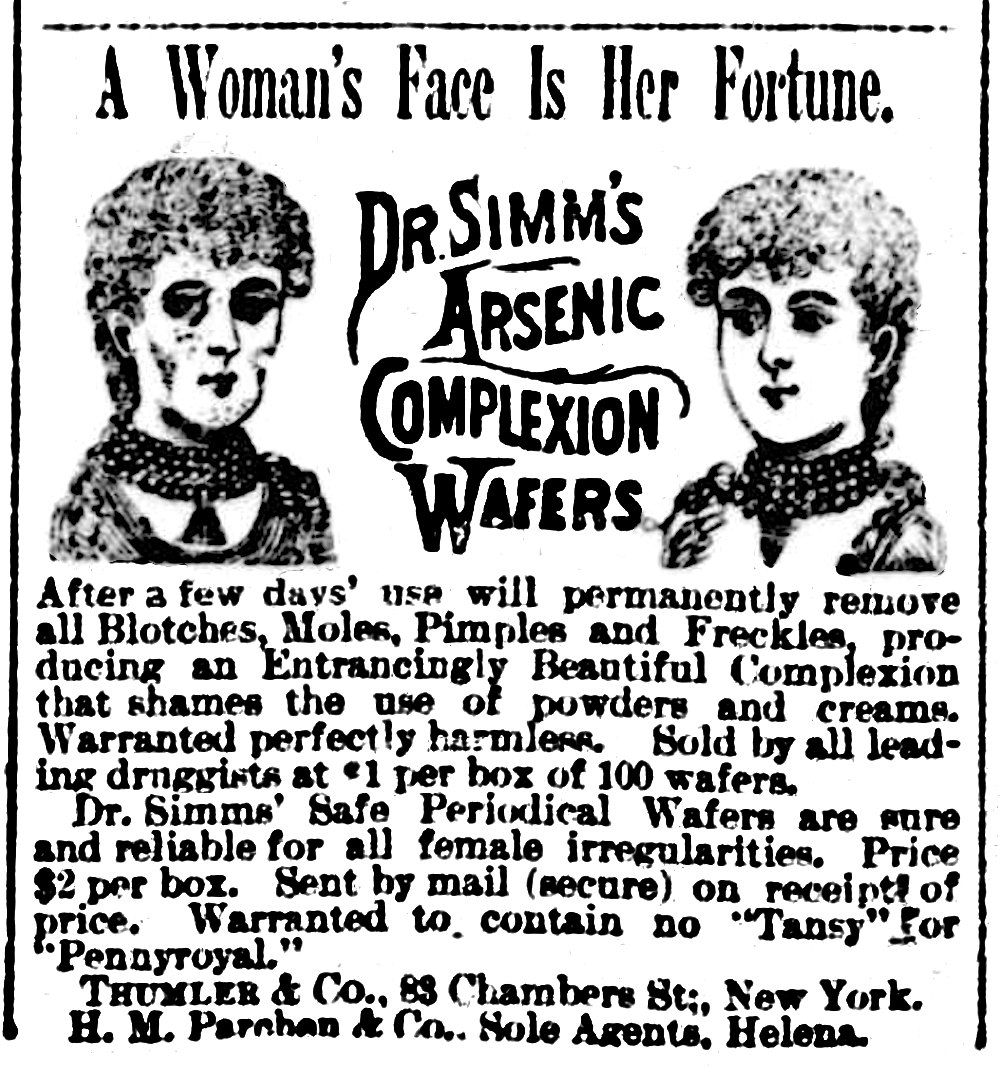

The heavy demand for skin lightening products resulted in manufactures producing body creams, hair dyes, shampoos/conditioners, and moisturizers all containing Mercury. Mercurial preparations to the skin has become a lucrative industry in Ghana and other countries by advertising models that have a fair skin complexion on billboards and in the media. The media glorifies and profits from women whom are sexually objectified so majority of the models featured in the skin bleaching advertisements are visually seducing modern women. BODY/WHITE is a popular brand that advertises a 'body clearing gel'; their high demand products are Gel and Savon Eclaircissant as well as a Gel Creme. According to BODY/WHITE they recommend customers to use the Gel Creme (concentrate moisturizer), Gel Eclaircissant (bleach agent), and the Savon Eclaircissant (skin lightening soap) to achieve more of a fair skin complexion. By advertising attractive yet modern women in commercials and magazines it easily influenced the average person to purchase the products in hopes to experience the exclusivity and attention women of a lighter skin tone receive. It is likely for most Ghanaians to assume that if an individual with a lighter skin complexion is in a position of power, because they bleached their skin to get into that position and is continuously bleaching to maintain it. The lighter pigmentation of skin a married woman in Ghana has is associated with a higher social and economical status. Over time this also became a major determinant of beauty, especially among Ghanaian women, and by the 1980s skin bleaching had spread throughout all socioeconomic classes of women. Scholars such as Jemima Pierre have theorized that the desire for lighter colored skin in Africa stems from the European colonization of the continent. Women in Ghana prioritize marriage because their culture stigmatizes unmarried women as unfaithful, socially deviant, lacks sexual allure and is considered as a "threat" to women whom are married. It is fairly common in Ghana for a woman's skin complexion and her level of attractiveness to determine her value in the marriage market. Despite being a common practice among Ghanaians, lower-class people are often openly ridiculed for skin bleaching. Blacks who bleach their skin (regardless of socioeconomic status) are often ridiculed for aspiring and ultimately failing to become white.

== Negative Health Risk Associated with Skin Lightening ==
Due to the negative health risks associated with skin lightening, Ghana has implemented legislation against the use of skin lightening products. According to the Skin Lightening Practices Among female High School Students in Ghana article 30-70% of females reported harmful affects after using skin bleaching agents over an extended time. The negative physical and mental impact skin bleaching has on individuals is what has caught the media and political officials attention in recent years. Kidney failure, neurological symptoms, kidney failure's, and skin cancers are a few negative physical effects from using skin lightening products. Although in recent years researchers have discovered that skin lightening is a cutaneous atrophy leading to telangiectasia, striae, and fragile skin. In recent years majority of skin bleaching products have recently been banned, Ghanaian women can still acquire these ingredients through illegal means by creating homemade skin lightening chemicals. The practice of skin bleaching is an inevitable phenomenon because traces of Mercury agents in cosmetics is unavoidable.
