= Skin lightening in the Middle East =

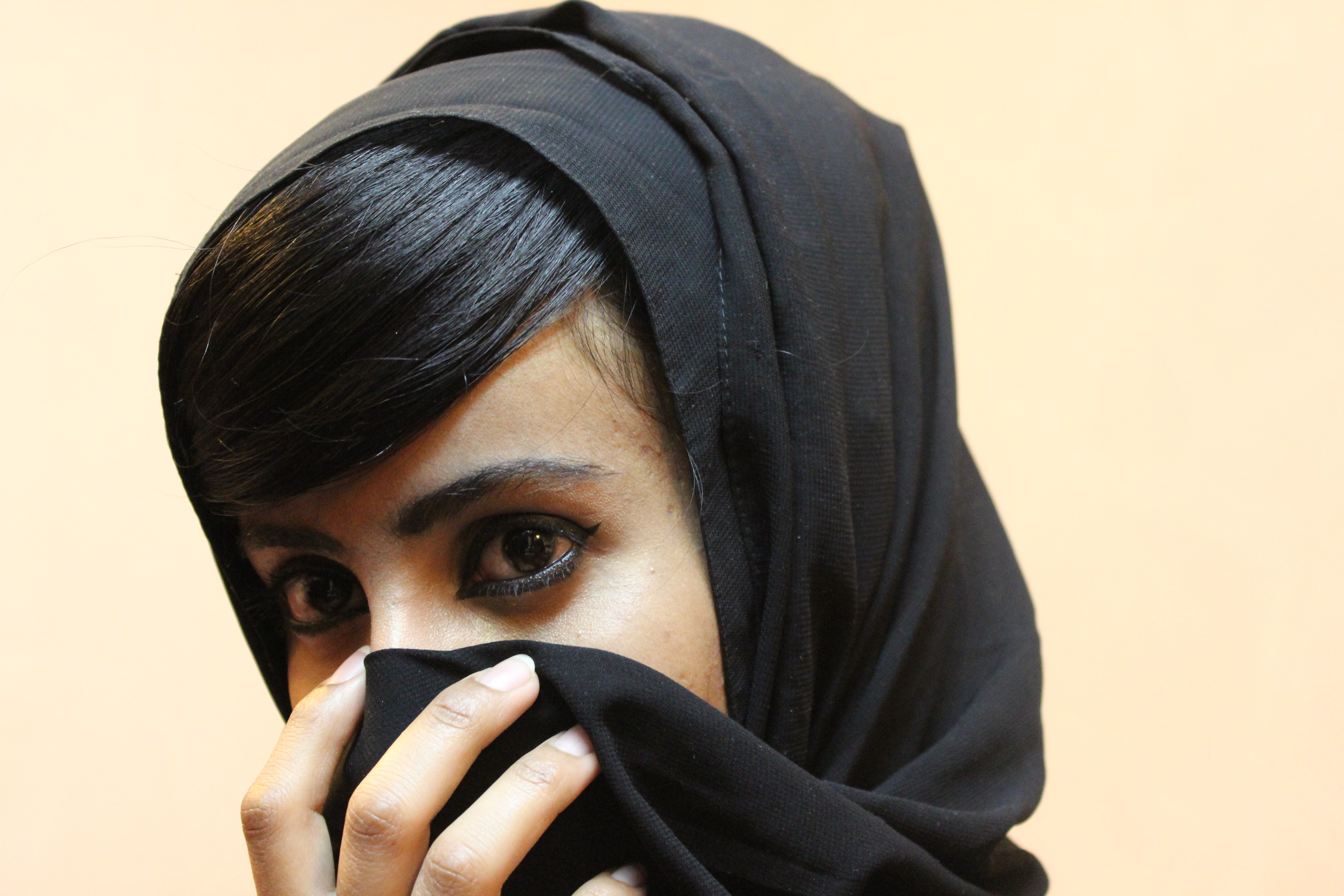
Skin lightening has been found to be a common practice in several Middle Eastern countries, most notably Jordan and Saudi Arabia.

Skin lightening is a common practice in several Middle Eastern countries, particularly among women. The use of skin lightening products among Middle Eastern women has been attributed to the perceived association between light skin and beauty, as well as marriage and employment opportunities. Furthermore, the portrayal of light skin as the beauty ideal in popular media has contributed to the use of skin lightening products among Middle Eastern women.

== History ==
Palestinian scholar Sonia Nimr has stated that the preference for lighter skin can be found in old Arabic and pre-Islamic poetry, stating:

For centuries there’s been an image that if you’re pale or whiter, it means you’re a lady. You don’t have to go out of the tent to do hard work.

== By country ==
=== Jordan ===
In a 2010 study conducted among 318 Jordanian women at selected pharmacy stores, 60.7% of the women reported using skin lightening products at some point in their lives.

=== Palestine ===
In 2009, a correspondent from The Christian Science Monitor investigated the use of skin lightening products among women in the city of Ramallah, by interviewing users of skin lightening products, as well as businesses which sold these products.

When interviewed, an employee at a beauty salon expressed the following sentiment:

Palestinians believe that white skin is beautiful. In the West, they sunbathe to get darker skin, but here, people like to lighten their skin and they hide from the sun at all costs.

A 2023 study found that Palestinian women from urban areas and those with a bachelor's degree were more likely to use skin lightening products.

=== Saudi Arabia ===
Skin lightening is prevalent among Saudi women, as indicated by several studies.

A 2019 study conducted among 760 Saudi female students found that 56.2% of the participants had used skin lightening products at some point in their lives. Women with lower socioeconomic status were more likely to use skin lightening products.

In another 2019 study, 605 Saudi women were asked about their use of skin lightening products. 63.1% of the participants reported using skin lightening products at some point in their lives.

== Media ==
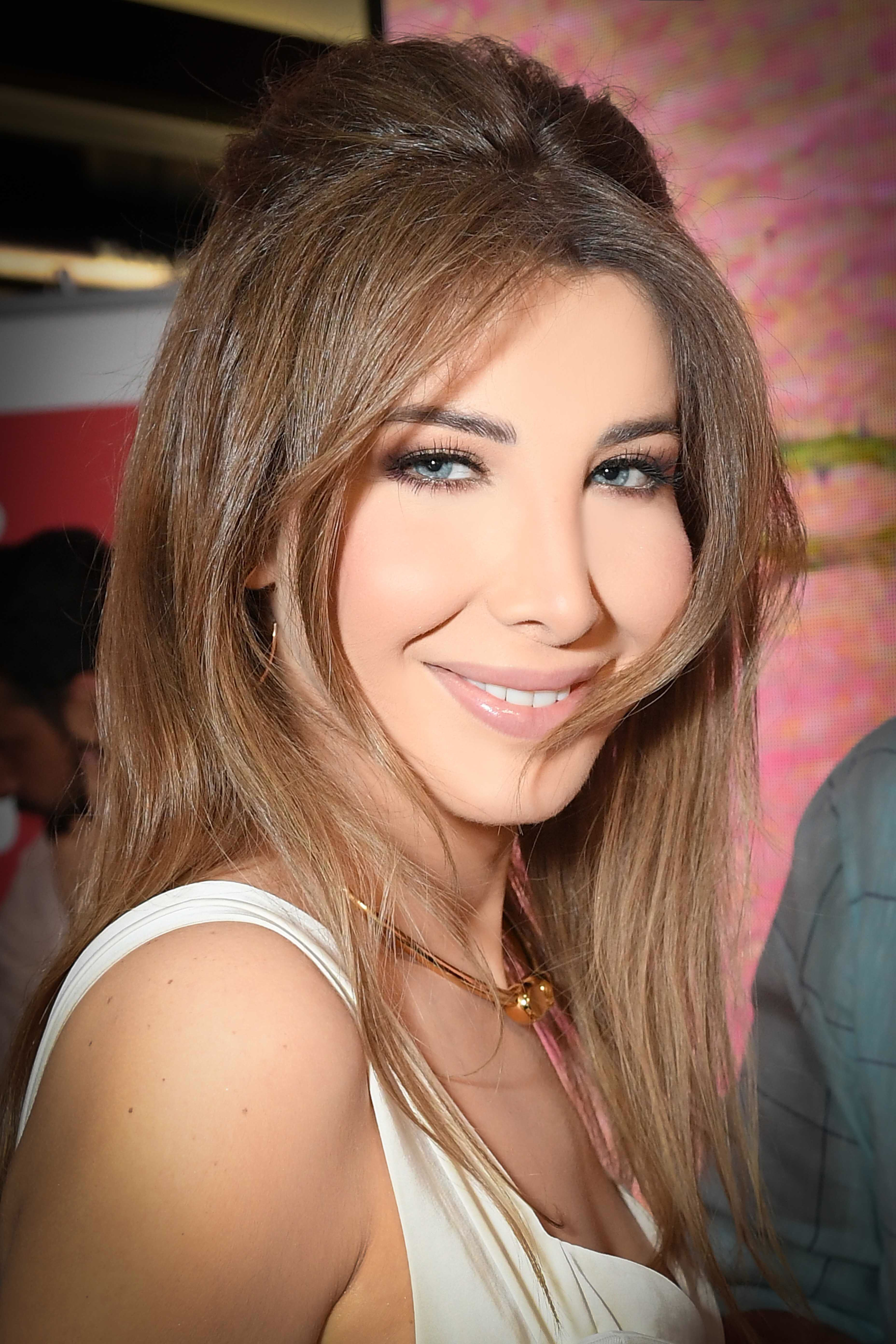
Nancy Ajram

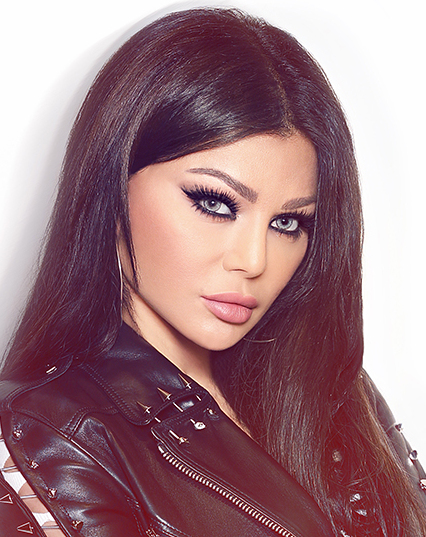
Haifa Wehbe

The portrayal of light skin as the beauty ideal in Middle Eastern popular media has contributed to the use of skin lightening products among Middle Eastern women. An investigation by a correspondent from The Christian Science Monitor conducted in the Palestinian city of Ramallah found that Lebanese singers with Eurocentric features, including Haifa Wehbe and Nancy Ajram are widely considered beauty icons. Furthermore, Sudanese-born writer Nesrine Malik stated

Lebanese standards of beauty and complexion have taken the Arab world by storm since the resurgence of the Lebanese in media ... further limiting the accepted definition of beauty as light-skinned, catty-eyed and slim-nosed.

== See also ==
- Human skin color
- Colorism
