= Skin whitening =

Practice of using chemical substances to lighten the skin

- Other names: Skin lightening, brightening, depigmentation, bleaching

Skin whitening, also known as skin lightening and skin bleaching, is the practice of using chemical substances in an attempt to lighten the skin or provide an even skin color by reducing the melanin concentration in the skin. Several chemicals have been shown to be effective in skin whitening, while some have proven to be toxic or have questionable safety profiles. This includes mercury compounds which may cause neurological problems and kidney problems.

In a number of African countries, above 25% of women regularly use skin-whitening products. In Asia, this number is around 40%. In India, over 50% of skin-care product sales are attributed to skin-lightening formulations. In Pakistan, where skin lightening products are popular, creams have been found to contain toxic levels of hydroquinone and mercury.

Efforts to lighten the skin date back to at least the 16th century in Asia. While a number of agents — such as kojic acid and alpha hydroxy acid — are allowed in cosmetics in Europe, a number of others such as hydroquinone and tretinoin are not. While some countries do not allow mercury compounds in cosmetics, others still do, and they can be purchased online.

== Use ==
Areas of increased pigmentation such as moles may be depigmented to match the surrounding skin. Effective agents for specific areas include corticosteroids, tretinoin, and hydroquinone. These agents are not allowed in cosmetics in Europe due to concerns about side effects. Attempts to whiten large areas of skin may also be carried out by certain cultures. This may be done for reasons of appearance, politics, or economics.

Skin whiteners can help achieve lighter skin tones, but many of them contain harmful ingredients, such as the steroid clobetasol propionate, inorganic mercury (mercuric chloride or amalgamated mercury), glutathione (an antioxidant traditionally used in cancer treatment), and the organic compound hydroquinone. Skin lighteners' main health risks are linked to (i) The overuse of topical clobetasol, which can cause systemic steroid effects from daily usage, especially on broad skin regions; and (ii) concealed mercury content, which can lead to mercury poisoning depending on individual susceptibility. Many skin whiteners contain a toxic form of mercury as the active ingredient. Their use, therefore, may harm a person's health and is illegal in many countries.

== Types ==
- Hydroquinone is a commonly used agent in skin whiteners. The European Union banned it from cosmetics in 2000. It works by decreasing melanin production.
- Tretinoin, also known as all-trans retinoic acid, may be used to whiten specific areas. It may be used in combination with steroids and hydroquinone.
- Alpha hydroxy acid (AHA) is used as a skin bleacher. Its biochemical mechanism is unclear. Side effects may include sun sensitivity, skin redness, thickening, or itching. Low concentrations may be used in cosmetics.
- Kojic acid has been found to be an effective lightener in some studies and is also allowed to be used in cosmetics. Side effects include redness and eczema.
- Glutathione is the most common agent taken by mouth to whiten the skin. It can be used as a cream. It is an antioxidant normally made by the body. Whether or not it actually works is unclear as of 2019. Due to side effects that may result from intravenous use, the government of the Philippines recommends against such use.
- One 2017 review found tentative evidence of benefit of tranexamic acid in melasma. Another 2017 review found that evidence to support its use was insufficient.
- Azelaic acid may be a second-line option for melasma.
- Decapaptide-12 and related peptides which act as tyrosinase inhibitors have been used as skin-lightening agents.
- A number of types of laser treatments have been used in melasma with some evidence of benefit. Reoccurrence is common, and certain types of lasers can result in more pigmentation.

== Side effects ==
Skin lightening creams have commonly contained mercury, hydroquinone, and corticosteroids. Because these compounds can induce both superficial and internal side effects, they are illegal to use and market in multiple nations. However, various chemical studies indicate that these compounds continue to be used in sold cosmetic products, though they are not explicitly declared as ingredients.

Prolonged usage of mercury-based products can ultimately discolor the skin, as mercury will accumulate within the dermis. Mercury toxicity can cause acute symptoms such as pneumonitis and gastric irritation. However, according to a study by Antoine Mahé and his colleagues, mercurial compounds can also contribute to long-term renal and neurological complications, the latter of which includes insomnia, memory loss, and irritability.

Other studies have explored the impact of hydroquinone exposure on health. Hydroquinone rapidly absorbs into the body via dermal contact; long-term usage has been found to cause nephrotoxicity and benzene-induced leukemia in the bone marrow. A study by Pascal del Giudice and Pinier Yves indicated that hydroquinone usage is strongly correlated with the development of ochronosis, cataracts, patchy depigmentation, and contact dermatitis. Ochronosis can lead to lesions and squamous cell carcinomas. While hydroquinone has not been officially classified as a carcinogen, it can metabolize into carcinogenic derivatives and induce genetic changes in the form of DNA damages.

Corticosteroids have become some of the most commonly incorporated lightening agents. Long-term usage over large areas of skin may promote percutaneous absorption, which can produce complications such as skin atrophy and fragility, glaucoma, cataracts, edemas, osteoporosis, menstrual irregularities, and growth suppression. A 2000 study performed in Dakar, Senegal, indicated that chronic usage of skin lighteners was a risk factor for hypertension and diabetes.

Chemically lightened skin is more highly susceptible to sun damage and dermal infection. Long-term users of skin bleachers can easily develop fungal infections and viral warts. Pregnant users may also experience health complications for both them and their children.

== Rate of usage ==
In 2013, 77% of Nigerian women, 52% of Senegalese women, and 25% of Malian women were using lightening products. In 2020, Der Spiegel reported that in Ghana, "When You Are Light-Skinned, You Earn More", and that "[s]ome pregnant women take tablets in the hopes that it will lead their child to be born with fair skin. Some apply bleaching lotion [...] to their babies, in the hopes that it will improve their child's chances."

Skin whiteners typically range widely in pricing. Olumide attributes this to the desire to portray whitening as financially accessible to all. These products are marketed to both men and women, though studies indicate that, in Africa, women use skin bleachers more than men do. A study by Lester Davids and his colleagues indicated that nations in Africa present high rates of usage for skin bleachers. Though many products have been banned due to toxic chemical compositions, Davids found that regulating policies are often not strictly enforced.

In India, the sales of skin lightening creams in 2012 totaled around 258 tons, and in 2013 sales were about US$300 million. By 2018, the industry for lightening cosmetics in India had achieved a net worth of nearly $180 million and an annual growth rate of 15%. As of 2013, the global market for skin lighteners was projected to reach $19.8 billion by 2018, based on sales growth primarily in Africa, Asia, and the Middle East.

In the United Kingdom, many skin whiteners are illegal due to possible adverse effects. Such products are frequently still sold even after shops have been prosecuted. Trading standards departments lack the resources to deal with the problem effectively.

== Motivations ==
According to Yetunde Mercy Olumide, advertisements for skin lighteners often present their products as stepping stones to attain greater social capital. For example, representatives of India's Glow & Lovely cosmetics asserted that their products allowed for socioeconomic mobility, akin to education.

In some parts of Africa, people with lighter skin are thought to be more attractive and likely to find more financial success than those with darker skin tones.

In 2009, historian Evelyn Nakano Glenn attributed sensitivities to skin tone among African Americans to the history of slavery. Lighter-skinned African Americans were perceived to be more intelligent and skilled than dark-skinned African Americans, who were relegated to more physically taxing, manual labor.

Studies have linked paler skin to achieving increased social standing and social mobility. A 2011 study found that in Tanzania, residents choose to bleach their skin to appear more European and impress peers and potential partners. Both advertisements and consumers have suggested that whiter skin can enhance individual sexual attractiveness. In 2011, sociologist Margaret Hunter noted the influence of mass-marketing and celebrity culture emphasizing whiteness as an ideal of beauty. A 2018 study found that lighter skin tones in both men and women in India improved their prospects for marriage.

Skin whitening is practiced by some people in several parts of Asia. In South Korea, light skin is generally considered to be an ideal of beauty. The K-pop and K-drama industries are generally saturated with fair-skinned celebrities, some of whom serve as brand ambassadors and beauty ideals. The increasing popularity of South Korean culture and K-beauty has been a factor in popularizing the skin whitening trend elsewhere in Asia, especially in poorer countries like Thailand, where many have begun to use unsafe skin-whitening products. In Nepal, cultural influence from Bollywood, which prominently features lighter skinned lead actors, has been linked to the use of skin whitening creams among some darker-skinned men.

Other motivations for skin whitening include desiring softer skin and wanting to conceal discolorations arising from pimples, rashes, or chronic skin conditions. Individuals with depigmenting conditions such as vitiligo have also been known to lighten their skin to achieve an even skin tone.

== Mechanism of action ==
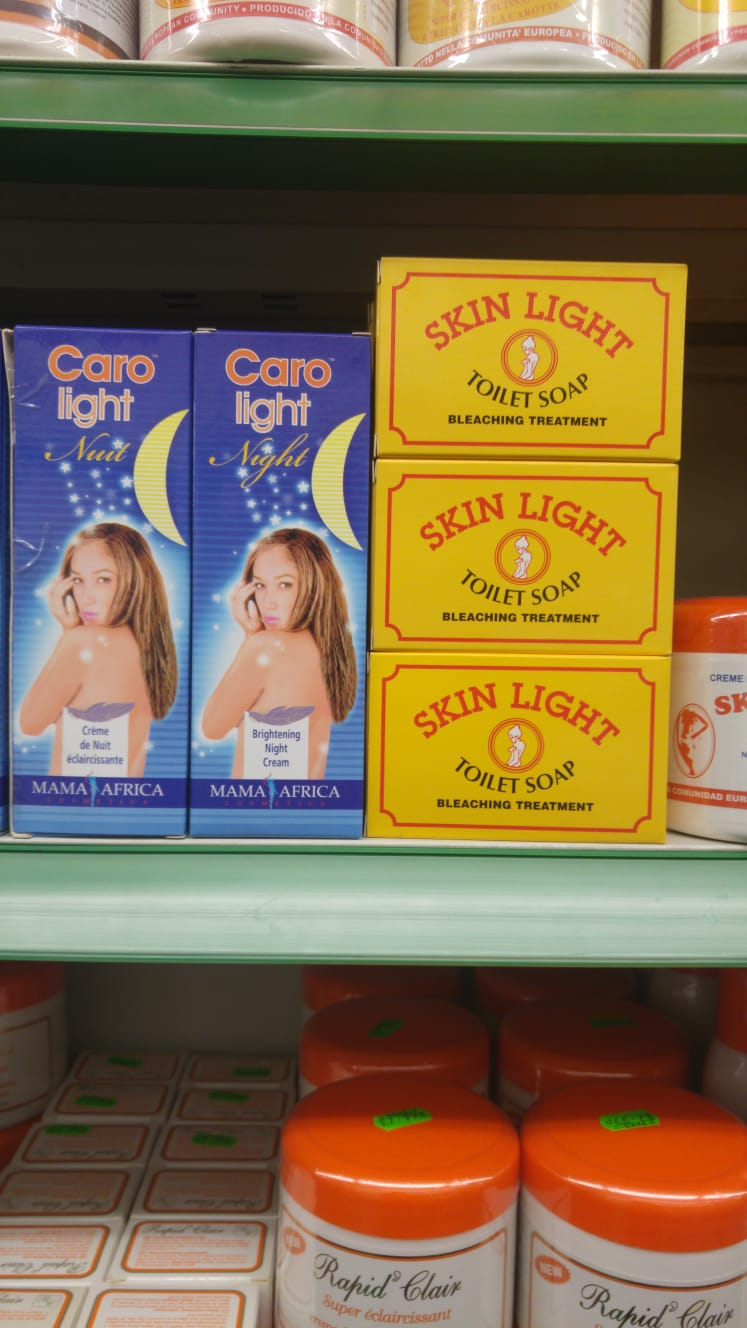
Skin lightening soaps

Skin whitening agents work by reducing the presence of melanin pigment in the skin. To accomplish this, there are several possible mechanisms of action:

- Inhibition of the activity of tyrosinase: The catalytic action of tyrosinase is inhibited by the skin whitening agent.
- Inhibition of the expression or activation of tyrosinase: The anti melanogenic agent causes less tyrosinase to be generated or prevents tyrosinase from being activated to its functional form.
- Scavenging of the intermediate products of melanin synthesis.
- Preventing the transfer of melanosomes to keratinocytes.
- Directly destroying existing melanin.
- Destroying melanocytes.

=== Inhibition of tyrosinase ===
Upregulation of tyrosinase caused by tyrosinase inhibitors. Several skin whitening agents, including tyrosinase inhibitors, have been found to cause an increase in the expression of tyrosinase, which by itself would increase melanin synthesis.

Microphthalmia-associated transcription factor (MITF) is the master transcription factor that controls the expression of TYR, TRP1, and TRP2, MART1, PMEL17, and many other important proteins involved in the function of melanocytes. (Note: "The transcriptional level is the first stage by which the expression of tyrosinase and related melanogenic enzymes may be modulated. Influential in this process, the microphthalmia-associated transcription factor (MITF) is a basic helix-loop-helix leucine zipper transcription factor that regulates melanocyte cellular differentiation as well as the transcription of melanogenic enzymes (tyrosinase, TYRP1, and TYRP2) and melanosome structural proteins (MART-1 and PMEL17) [references omitted].") Downregulation of MITF decreases melanogenesis and is a mechanism of action of some skin whitening agents. Various signaling pathways and genetic mutations influence the expression of MITF. (Note: Many papers have described the signaling pathways affecting melanogenesis and other functions of melanocytes. The following reviews are suggested reading (all of which are available online at no cost): Smit, Vicanova, Pavel (2009). For a description with emphasis on physiology, see Yamaguchi, Hearing (2009) or Kondo (2011). An extensive and detailed review was written by Slominski et al. (2004).)

=== MC1R receptor and cAMP ===
The melanocortin 1 receptor (MC1R) is a transmembrane and G-protein coupled receptor expressed in melanocytes. MC1R is an important target for the regulation of melanogenesis. Agonism of MC1R increases the ratio of eumelanin to pheomelanin and increases the generation of melanin overall.

The MC1R and cAMP signaling pathway starts with the activation of MC1R, which causes activation of adenylyl cyclase (AC), which produces cyclic adenosine monophosphate (cAMP), which activates protein kinase A (PKA), which activates by protein phosphorylation cAMP response element-binding protein (CREB), which upregulates MITF, of which CREB is a transcription factor.

Alpha-melanocyte stimulating hormone (α-MSH), beta-melanocyte stimulating hormone (β-MSH), and adrenocorticotropic hormone are endogenous agonists of MC1R. Agouti signaling protein (ASIP) appears to be the only endogenous antagonist of MC1R. Synthetic MC1R agonists have been designed, such as the peptides afamelanotide and melanotan II.

Mutations of the MC1R gene correlate are at least partially responsible for red hair, white skin, and an increased risk for skin cancer in some individuals.

=== Transfer of melanosomes ===
Within the skin, melanocytes are present in the basal layer of the epidermis; from these, melanocytes originate dendrites that reach keratinocytes. (Note: "In the skin, melanocytes are situated on the basal layer, which separates the dermis and epidermis. Approximately 36 keratinocytes surround one melanocyte. Together, they form the so-called epidermal melanin unit. The melanin produced and stored inside the melanocyte in the melanosomal compartment is transported via dendrites to the overlaying keratinocytes." "Each melanocyte resides in the basal epithelial layer and, by virtue of its dendrites, interacts with approximately 36 keratinocytes to transfer melanosomes and protect the skin from photo-induced carcinogenesis. Furthermore, the amount and type of melanin produced and transferred to the keratinocytes with subsequent incorporation, aggregation, and degradation influences skin complexion coloration [reference omitted]." Wu, Hammer (2014) describe the number of keratinocytes per melanocyte as above 40.)

Melanosomes, along with the melanin they contain, are transferred from melanocytes to keratinocytes when keratinocytes are low in the epidermis. (Note: Research about the mechanism of melanosome transfer has been reviewed by Wu, and Hammer (2014).) Keratinocytes carry the melanosomes with them as they move toward the surface. Keratinocytes contribute to skin pigmentation by holding the melanin originating in melanocytes and inducing melanogenesis through chemical signals directed at melanocytes. The transfer of melanosomes to keratinocytes is a necessary condition for the visible pigmentation of the skin. Blocking this transfer is a mechanism of action of some skin whitening agents.

The protease-activated receptor 2 (PAR2) is a transmembrane and G-protein coupled receptor expressed in keratinocytes and involved in melanocyte transfer. (Note: References about PAR2 and its role in skin pigmentation: Kim et al. (2016), Choi et al. (2014), Wu, Hammer (2014), Ando et al. (2012), Ando et al. (2010).) Antagonists of PAR2 inhibit the transfer of melanosomes and have skin whitening effects, while agonists of PAR2 have the opposite effect.

=== Destroying melanocytes ===
Some compounds are known to destroy melanocytes; this mechanism of action is often used to remove the remaining pigmentation in cases of vitiligo.

== History ==
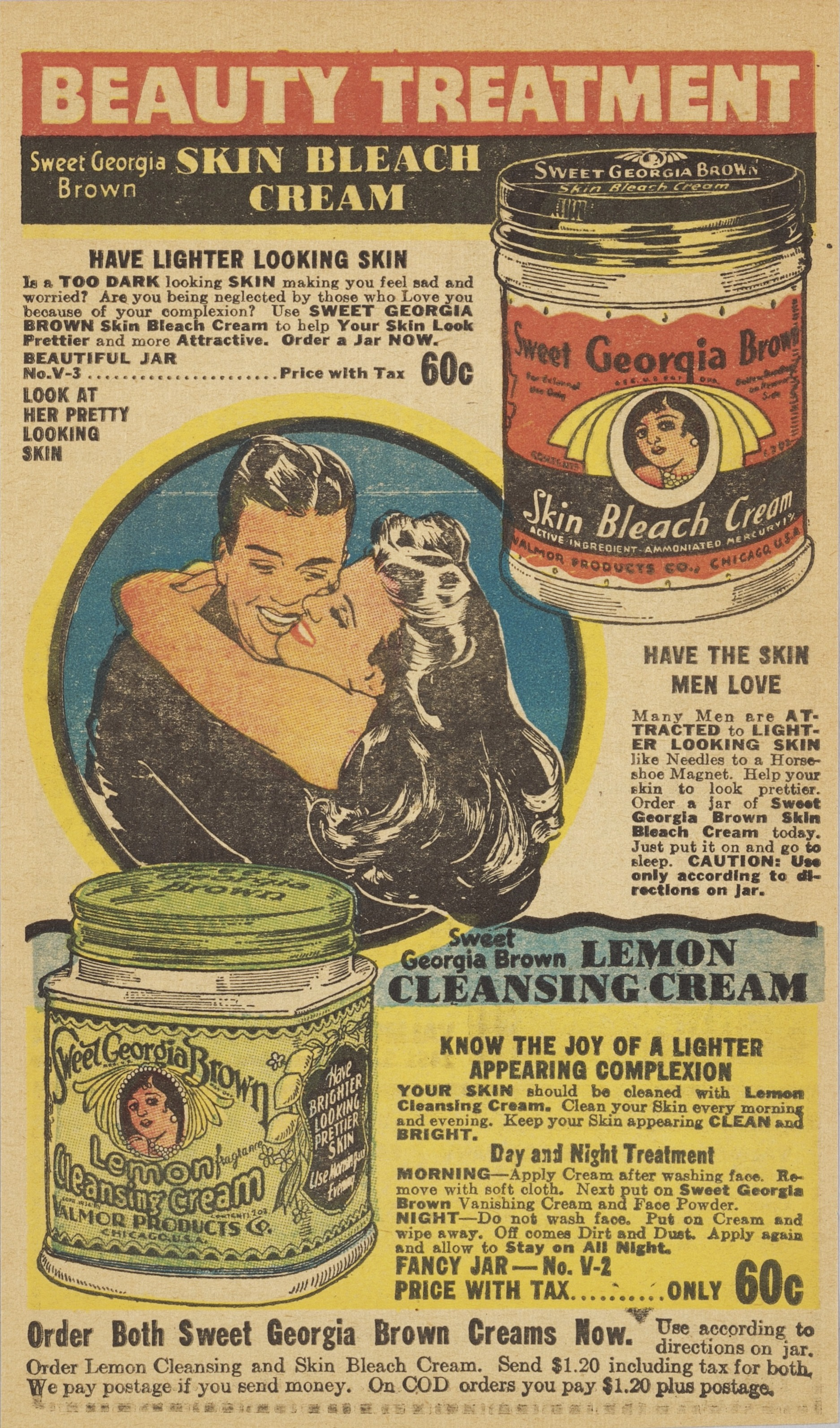
An advertisement from the 1930s for Sweet Georgia Brown skin bleaching cream

Early skin whitening practices were not well-documented. Skin whitening is a practice that has made its way across the entire globe with a multitude of cultures adopting the practice under various ideologies. Commonly, the practice has been marketed towards women under the pretense that porcelain skin was the ideal representation of beauty and status. The first recorded practices of skin whitening can be traced back to over 200 B.C. across a multitude of civilizations that utilized natural sources of ingredients to facilitate the production of skin whitening substances.

One of these methods include the use of honey and olive oil as a method of whitening the skin in different civilizations such as in Egypt as well as in Greek culture. According to anthropologist Nina Jablonski, these practices did not become publicized until famous figures, such as Cleopatra and Queen Elizabeth, began to use them regularly. Cosmetic formulas initially spread from continental Europe and China to Britain and Japan, respectively.

Various historians argue that, across cultures, skin lightening became a desirable norm due to implications of wealth. Although the majority methods of which the skin whitening process is undertaken have been deemed unsafe due to various side effects, they are still used for a range of purposes, including the desire for improvement of one's socioeconomic status as well as the socialization in some cultures of one's perceived inferiority based on having darker or lighter skin than others.

This process through which perceived inferiority can be exercised physically can be looked back on through a foundational perspective of the "Nigrescence Theory". This theory explains the distinction of one's own socialized identity through various stages, and the pigmentation of the skin that someone is born with that is associated with the socialization process within a culture. More specifically, out of the four stages associated with this theory, the first one, named the "pre-encounter" stage, highlights the underlying concept one not associating themselves with their own culture or values due partly to the misinformation one has been taught to believe and therefore seeks validation and worthiness from those who have misinformed that person.

=== East Asia ===
The history of skin whitening in East Asia dates to ancient times. To be light in an environment in which the sun was harsh implied wealth and nobility because those individuals were able to remain indoors while servants had to labor outside.

Ancient Asian cultures also associated light skin with feminine beauty. "Jade" white skin in Korea is known to have been the ideal as far back as the Gojoseon era. Japan's Edo period saw the start of a trend of women whitening their faces with rice powder as a "moral duty". Chinese women valued a "milk white" complexion and swallowed powdered pearls towards that end.

Skin-lightening practices had achieved great importance in East Asia as early as the 16th century. Similar to early European cosmetics, white makeup was reported to cause severe health problems and physical malformations. In Japan, samurai mothers who used lead-based white paint on their faces often had children who exhibited symptoms of lead toxicity and stunted bone growth. Japanese nobility, including both men and women, often applied white lead powder to their faces prior to the Meiji restoration.

Following the Meiji restoration, men and women reserved white lead makeup and traditional attire for special occasions. In China, Korea, and Japan, washing one's face with rice water was also practiced, as it was believed to naturally whiten skin. Historians also noted that as East Asian women immigrated to the United States, immigrant women engaged in skin lightening more frequently than women who did not immigrate.

Advertisements were a large influence in the marketable appeal of skin whitening in China and Taiwan. Skincare products that are recognized to protect the skin included chemicals that assist in skin whitening. These products were marketed and promoted as the solution to appearing young forever. Skincare products have been predominantly created to serve as anti-aging to women in China and Taiwan of all ages.

=== South East Asia ===
Nina Jablonski and Evelyn Nakano Glenn both assert that skin whitening in many South and Southeast Asian nations such as the Philippines grew in popularity through these nations' histories of European colonization. Multiple studies find that preferences for lighter skin in India were historically linked to both the Indian caste system and centuries of outside rule by light-skinned nations. In the Philippines and many Southeast Asian countries, lighter skin was associated with higher social status. Historians indicate that the social hierarchies in the Philippines encompasses a spectrum of skin tones due to intermarriages between indigenous populations, East Asian settlers from Japan and China, and European and American colonists.

=== South Asia ===
In South Asia, the color of one's skin determined social status as it implied the circumstances of one's positionality. While pale skin suggested being away from the sun, darker skin signified the result of working in external conditions. With colonial influence from Britain's occupation, there was a distinction in superiority and inferiority. With those in power attributing pale complexions, there was an association tied among class and position. The South Asian film industry was a contributing factor from colonialism in the reinforcement of these narratives. Turmeric was a used ingredient in lightening skin tone complexion to be seen as desirable.

=== Middle East ===
Skin lightening is a common practice among women in several Middle Eastern countries, most notably Jordan and Saudi Arabia. This practice has been attributed to a perceived association between light skin and beauty, as well as marriage and employment opportunities.

=== Europe ===
Skin whitening practices have been documented in ancient Greece and Rome. Bleaching cosmetics often incorporated white lead carbonate and mercury as lightening agents. These products were ultimately known to cause skin erosion.

Skin whitening was frequently documented during the Elizabethan era. Queen Elizabeth's own usage of skin lighteners became a prominent standard of beauty. According to medieval historians, light skin was an indicator of aristocracy and higher socioeconomic class, as laborers were more frequently exposed to outdoor sunlight. Men and women lightened their skin superficially and chemically, using white powder and Venetian ceruse, respectively. Venetian ceruse consisted of a lead and vinegar mixture, known to cause hair loss, skin corrosion, muscle paralysis, tooth deterioration, blindness, and premature aging. Venetian ceruse was also reported as a source of lead poisoning. Lye and ammonia, found in other skin whiteners, compounded the toxic effects of lead. Other practices done in the name of skin whitening included washing one's face in urine and ingesting wafers of arsenic.

=== United States ===
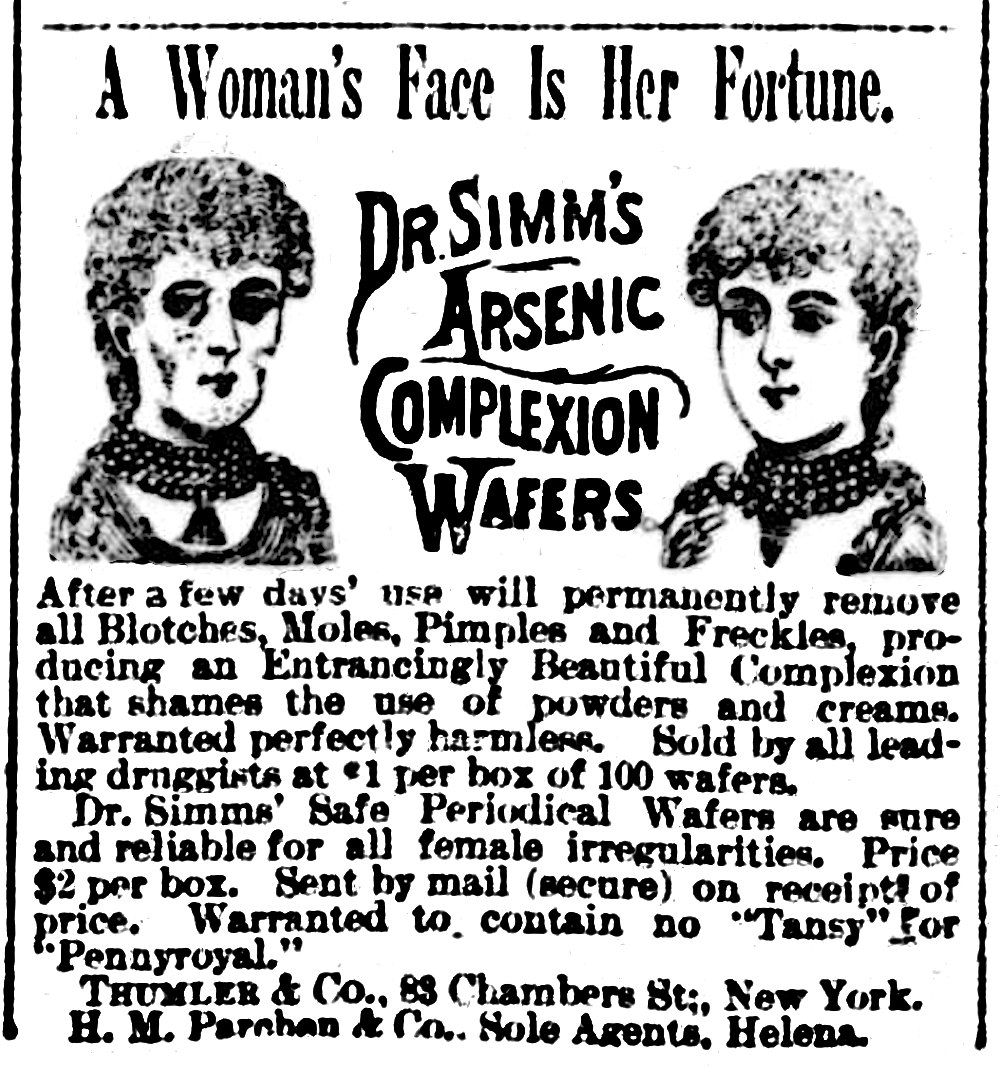
An advertisement from 1889 for arsenic wafers in the United States

According to scholar Shirley Anne Tate, skin whiteners in the United States were initially predominantly used by white women. European immigrants introduced recipes for cosmetic skin lighteners into the American colonies, where they eventually evolved to incorporate indigenous and West African herbal traditions. Skin whitening grew in popularity in the 1800s, as white women in the United States began to emulate the skin-whitening practices performed by those in Europe. As such, American women similarly used ceruse, arsenic wafers, and products that contained toxic dosages of lead and mercury. Mormon denominations, like the Church of Jesus Christ of Latter-day Saints (LDS church), taught into the 1970s that God would whiten the skin color of Native American adherents, and that skin color was correlated with premortal obedience to God.

In the 2015 book, Skin bleaching in Black Atlantic zones: shade shifters, author Shirley Anne Tate writes that skin lightening was often not well-received in Black culture. Women in Black cultures who used skin whiteners were described as artificial, while Black men who used skin whiteners were described as overly effeminate. Despite this reception, skin whitening remained a popular practice. Historians note that advertisements for skin whiteners in the 20th century often associated pale skin with gentility.

According to historian Kathy Peiss, skin whitening among black American women had been documented starting in the mid-nineteenth century. Historians credited the increased marketing of skin whiteners to the culture of the Jim Crow era, as black Americans faced continued social and legal restrictions. Cosmetic advertisements directed at black consumers often framed resulting lighter complexions as cleaner and better. Simultaneously, cosmetic and beauty magazines often published criticisms of black women who used skin bleachers, arguing that they appeared unnatural and fraudulent.

In the 1930s, tanned skin became popular among white women as a new symbol of wealth. Some historians assert that industrialization had created indoor settings for labor, causing tanned skin to be associated more with sunbathing, travel, and leisure. The growth of the Black is Beautiful movement in the 1960s, combined with greater awareness of potential health hazards, also temporarily slowed the sale and popularity of skin bleachers. However, by the 1980s, paler skin once again became more desirable, as tanning became linked to premature aging and sun damage.

=== Americas ===
Skin whitening practices have also been well documented in South America and the Caribbean. Sociologists such as Jack Menke noted that early skin-lightening practices among indigenous women were motivated by the attentions of conquistadores. Recovered journals from women in Suriname indicated that they used vegetable mixtures to lighten their skin, which produced painful side effects.

Various studies have linked the prevalence of skin whitening in Latin American nations to their histories and legacies of colonization and slavery. Witness accounts in colonial Jamaica reported that women practiced "flaying" and "skinning" on themselves, using astringent lotions to appear lighter. Caribbean creole women were also observed to treat their skin with cashew nut oil, which burned the external layers of skin.

Skin whitening practices grew in popularity, partly as a consequence of blanqueamiento in Latin America. The ideologies behind blanqueamiento promoted the idea of social hierarchy, based on Eurocentric features and skin tone.

=== Africa ===
Records indicate prominent usage of skin lighteners in South Africa beginning in the 20th century. Historians suggest that this may be associated with the passage of the Coloured Labor Preference Act, in 1955. Skin lighteners in South Africa were first marketed to white consumers, then eventually to consumers of color. Initially, skin whitening was typically practiced by rural and poor South African women; however, studies indicate that the practice has become increasingly prevalent among black women with higher incomes and levels of education.

Historian Lynn Thomas attributes the initial popularity of these skin whiteners to the socially desired implications of limited outdoor labor, sexual relationships with lighter-skinned partners, and lighter-skinned heritage. Starting in the 1970s, the South African government established regulations for skin-whitening products, banning products that contained mercury or high levels of hydroquinone. By the 1980s, critiques of skin whitening had become incorporated into the anti-apartheid movement, given skin-whitening's adverse consequences on health and its social implications of colorism.

In Ghana, preferences for lighter skin had been documented beginning in the 16th century. Shirley Anne Tate attributes this to the aesthetics and statuses promoted during the period of colonial rule, citing the social influence and wealth of notable Euro-Ghanaian families. Other studies found that, in Tanzania, skin bleaching has been regularly practiced by middle and working classes, as light skin was perceived to facilitate social mobility.

Skin whitening practices in several other African countries increased following the onset of independence movements against European colonial rule. Maya Allen attributed this to the increased flow of European products and commercial influence into colonized regions. Several historians have suggested that the increased prevalence of skin whitening in "the Global South" is potentially tied to both precolonial notions of beauty and post-colonial hierarchies of race.

== Health hazards ==
Several chemical substances have been found to be effective in skin whitening, but some have been proven or suspected to be toxic. This includes compounds containing mercury, which can cause neurological and kidney problems. These products also contain collagen, which can be harmful to the skin. It is present in day creams and beauty masks. Collagen is an insoluble fibrous protein that is too large to penetrate the skin, thus it can clog pores.

The use of these products can be hazardous to health, potentially causing acne, stretch marks, skin cancer, hypertension, or diabetes, especially when the product contains hydroquinone, mercury, cortisone, or vitamin A. Allergic reactions or undesirable effects, such as uneven hyperpigmentation or patchy depigmentation, can also occur.

Among the ingredients, hydroquinone is also commonly found and is responsible for multiple side effects. It can interfere with the reagents used in capillary blood glucose meters, artificially raising blood glucose levels.

In 1997, in Paris, the French police dismantled a network involved in the illegal trafficking of skin lightening products, primarily targeting Congolese migrants. Such products represent a significant market despite their health risks. Users resort to preparations containing mercury or bleach, or products containing corticosteroids or quinine. The Saint-Louis Hospital in Paris had to establish a specialized department to deal with the skin disorders caused by skin bleaching.

The World Health Organization (WHO) has noted the significant presence of inorganic mercury added to skin lightening products, which is known to be associated with skin cancer.

== See also ==
- Colorism
- Light skin
- Ethnic plastic surgery
- Anal bleaching
- Hypopigmentation
- Depigmentation
- Xeesal, skin bleaching technique in Senegal
- Racial whitening
- Colonial mentality

== Notes ==
Italics have been preserved whenever they appear in quotations. Text between square brackets are additional notes not present in the source.
