= Xeesal =

Senegalese skin bleaching technique

Xeesal is a technique of skin bleaching practiced by Senegalese women. It is a way of making their skin paler by applying ointments. Wealthy women prefer to buy the products from the pharmacy. Those with less money buy the products from markets, or make their own. However, all of these products have common side effects: namely, an offensive odour, and the ability to cause, among other things, skin cancer.
