= Pigmentatio reticularis faciei et colli =

- Specialty: Dermatology

Pigmentatio reticularis faciei et colli is a cutaneous condition characterized by a disturbance of human pigmentation.

== See also ==
- Erythromelanosis follicularis faciei et colli
- List of cutaneous conditions
