= Cosmetic camouflage =

Concealment of skin irregularities using makeup creams or powders

Cosmetic camouflage is the application of make-up creams and/or powders to conceal color or contour irregularities or abnormalities of the face or body. Cosmetic camouflage may be used to address skin-related problems such as angiomas, redness, telangiectasia, vitiligo, sunspots, senile spots, acne, burns, stretch-marks, scars, bruises, and tattoos. Furthermore, cosmetic camouflage may reduce the psychological impact of skin imperfections. Cosmetic camouflage creams were first developed by plastic surgeons during World War II to cover the massive burns received by fighter pilots. In modern times, men, women and children may use cosmetic camouflage.

== Examples ==
- Birthmarks – A birthmark is a blemish on the skin formed after birth. Port wine stains are a type of birthmark characterized by large, splotchy, wine colored marks. They can be camouflaged to quite an extent with a green concealer.
- Rosacea – Rosacea is a skin condition that results in dilated facial blood vessels with redness sometimes combined with pustules. A green concealer should be applied to the affected areas to neutralize redness.
- Vitiligo
- Chloasma
- Cutaneous lupus erythematosus
- Jessner lymphocytic infiltrate
- Veins
- Burns – A burn is a type of injury to the skin caused by heat, electricity, chemicals, light, radiation or friction. It can be camouflaged using green concealer.
- Scarring from surgery, trauma, acne, etc. A scar results from the biologic process of wound repair in the skin and other tissues of the body. Thus, scarring is a natural part of the healing process. E.g. Blepharoplasty (Eye lift). Blepharoplasty gives a completely new look to the face by removing the crepey, laggy skin & tired looks of the eyes. Green concealer should be used sparingly in the area where there is redness. It is preferable not to use kohl or mascara for at least 3–4 weeks after surgery.
- Tattoos – A tattoo is a marking made by inserting indelible ink into the dermis layer of the skin to change the pigment for decorative or other reasons. Tattoos on humans are a type of decorative body modification.
- Many other dermatological conditions.

Cosmetic camouflage is also called camouflage makeup, cover makeup, or corrective makeup.
