= Erythromelanosis follicularis faciei et colli =

- Specialty: Dermatology

Erythromelanosis follicularis faciei et colli is an erythematous pigmentary disease involving the follicles, characterized by a reddish-brown, sharply demarcated, symmetrical discoloration involving the preauricular and maxillary regions.

== Signs and symptoms ==
Erythromelanosis follicularis faciei et colli is characterized by patches of erythema (with or without telangiectasia), follicular papules (follicular plugging), and bilateral and symmetrical hyperpigmentation (reddish-brown pigmentation) that start on the preauricular areas and cheeks and can eventually migrate to the submandibular portions of the neck.

== Causes ==
Although the cause of this disorder is unknown, familial cases, spontaneous mutation, and an autosomal recessive pattern of inheritance have all been documented.

== Diagnosis ==
Histopathologic observations include vascular dilatation in the upper dermis, hyperkeratosis, follicular plugging, and enhanced basal membrane pigmentation.

== Treatment ==
Topical therapies include metronidazole, ammonium lactate, tacalcitol ointment, retinoids, hydroquinone, and salicylic acid. There have been reports of erythema and hyperpigmentation treated with pulsed dye laser or Nd:YAG laser.

== See also ==
- Pigmentatio reticularis faciei et colli
- List of cutaneous conditions
