= Ochronosis =

- Homogentisic acid
- Specialty: Endocrinology

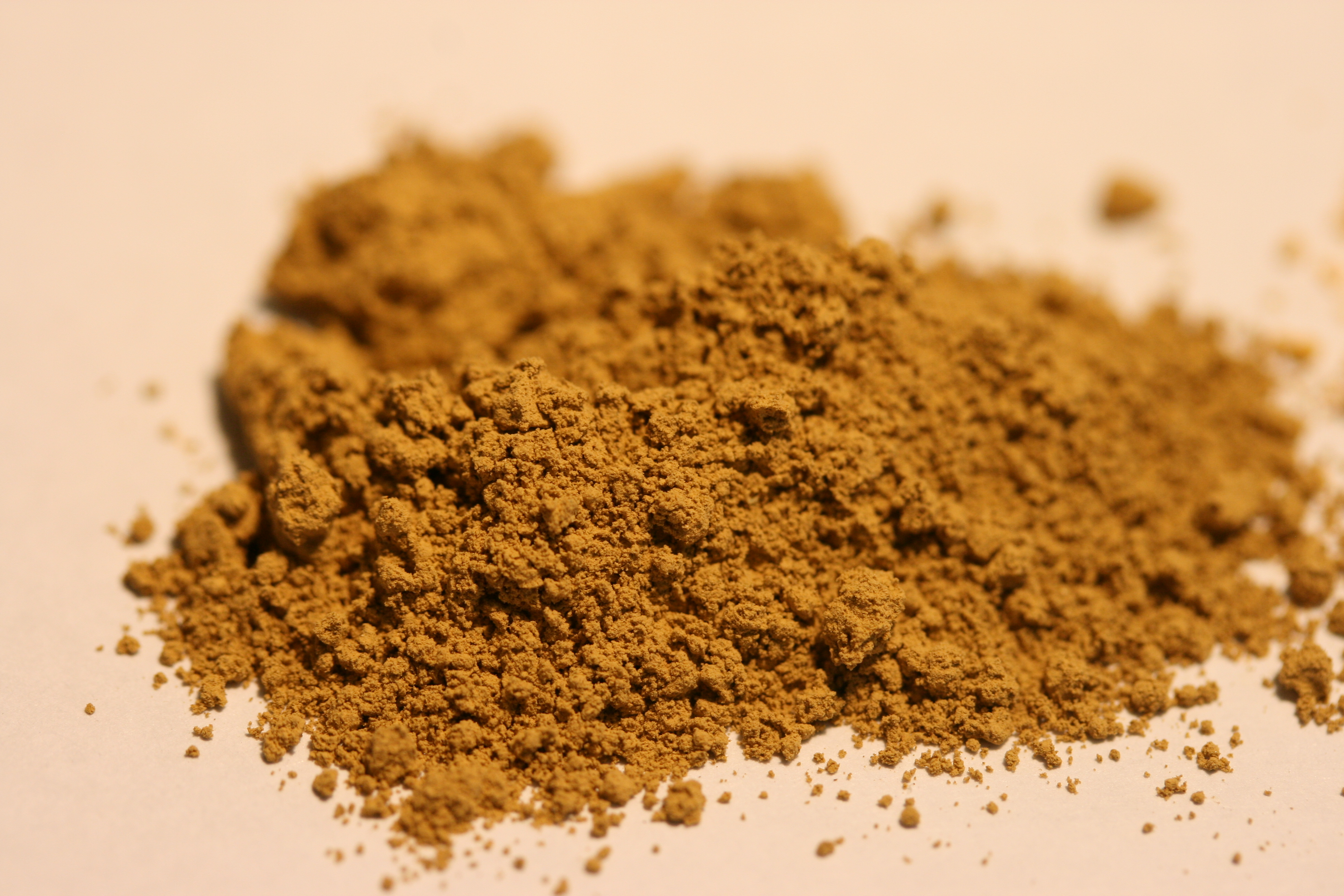
Ocher pigment, after which the condition was named, due to the similar color of affected tissue

Ochronosis is a medical condition characterized by the accumulation of homogentisic acid in connective tissues, leading to pigmentation changes. The term derives from the yellowish-brown (ocher-like) discoloration observed in histological samples. However, macroscopically, the affected tissues often appear bluish-grey due to the Tyndall effect, a phenomenon in which scattered light gives deeper-lying pigments a blue hue.

Ochronosis is most commonly associated with the rare metabolic disorder alkaptonuria, a genetic condition involving homogentisic acid oxidase deficiency. It may also occur as an acquired condition, known as exogenous ochronosis, resulting from prolonged topical application or systemic exposure to certain phenol derivatives, particularly hydroquinone.

The condition was first described by German pathologist Rudolf Virchow in 1865.

== Types ==
The two types of ochronosis are endogenous and exogenous. The endogenous variety is an autosomal-recessive disease, known as alkaptonuria, that is caused by a lack of homogentisate oxidase enzyme. Exogenous ochronosis is an avoidable dermatitis that can be caused by the topical application of compounds such as hydroquinone or phenols. It was first seen in 1912, when a patient who used phenol on a leg ulcer was found by Beddard and Plumtre to have this condition. Hydroquinone-induced exogenous ochronosis was found in 1975 by Findlay, who observed the condition in patients who used skin lightening creams containing the compound.

The three clinical stages of exogenous ochronosis are:

1. Erythema and mild hyperpigmentation
2. Hyperpigmentation and "caviar-like" lesions
3. Papulonodular lesions

== Signs and symptoms ==
- Skin: The pigment is deposited throughout the skin, but only becomes apparent in certain locations, where the concentration is great enough to be seen clinically. This usually occurs in areas where connective tissue is thick (joints, tympanic membrane) or close to the surface of the skin (thenar and hypothenar eminences and the sides of the fingers). In exogenous ochronosis, the hyperpigmentation is localized to the area where the inciting agent is applied. Intradermal nevi can appear like blue nevi.
- Eye: Ocular manifestations are frequent in patients with ochronosis; most commonly hyperpigmentation of the sclera, primarily observed symmetrically to both sides of the cornea within the palpebral fissure. Furthermore, brown pigment spots in the limbus are generally considered pathognomonic. These ocular signs generally occur early in the development of the disease and can serve as a valuable diagnostic feature of the disease.
- Cartilage: Darkening and hardening of ear cartilage is a prominent feature of ochronosis. Nasal cartilage is also frequently involved. The voice can be affected by hardening of the laryngeal cartilage. Stiffening of the ribs with decreased lung function has also been reported. The intervertebral cartilage is also more prone to herniation.
- Connective tissue: Hardening of tendons and ligaments can predispose them to rupture. Color changes in the joints can be observed clinically. Arthropathy is common due to chronic inflammation and microruptures.
- Heart valves: Stenosis can results from the increased rigidity of the connective tissue as well as chronic inflammation.

Symptoms of exogenous ochronosis include:

1. Yellow-brown, banana-shaped fibers
2. Caviar-like papules
3. Brown-grey or blue-black hyperpigmentation

Most of the lesions are seen on areas of the body that get the most sun.

== Causes ==
Exogenous ochronosis can be caused from long-term use of certain "skin-lightening" products, even if the hydroquinone is in amounts as small as 2%. Skin-lightening products are still prevalent in many parts of the world. This may be due to aesthetic or social-standing reasons, in areas where a lighter skin tone is considered to be a sign of wealth or beauty. Also, skin-lightening creams containing compounds such as hydroquinone are commonly used to help with hyperpigmentation disorders such as melasma.

Hydroquinone is the compound most frequently used in skin-whitening products. Due to concerns about its side effects, it was almost banned by the FDA in 2006, as medical issues of carcinogenicity and reports of disfiguring ochronosis existed. In the European Union hydroquinone has been banned in cosmetic creams since 2000.

Long-term use of creams containing this compound may lead to exogenous ochronotic lesions. The duration of use is directly proportional to the risk of developing the condition, with most cases occurring after years of use. Around 10–15 million skin lightening products are sold annually, with Japan being the major buyer.

== Pathophysiology ==
Ochronosis occurs because of deposition of phenols (such as homogentisic acid and hydroquinone) as plaques in the matrix of cartilage. The pigments can also be incorporated into collagen and elastin fibers. In the skin, the pigment alters the structure of the fibers, causing enlargement and curling. The embedded pigments also form crosslinks with pigment depositions in adjacent fibers, stabilizing and reducing the elastic recoil of the fibers. This results in hardening of elastic structures, increasing their rigidity and brittleness. Once ruptured, the exposed pigments cause a foreign body reaction and inflammation. This pigment deposition also invokes deposition of hydroxyapatite, the mineral responsible for bone calcification, further hardening the connective tissue. The pigment can also be excreted by glandular cells in apocrine and ceruminous sweat glands, as well as breast and prostate tissue. This results in darkly pigmented sweat and breast milk. Excretion of the pigment is only found in endogenous ochronosis and should not occur from topical phenols.

Pathophysiology of alcaptonuria is due to the absence of functional homogentisate dioxygenase in the liver

== Diagnosis ==
The diagnosis is often made as an incidental finding intraoperatively. Cartilage exposed to the air turns dark gray or black within minutes.

== Treatment ==
Treatment is predominantly preventive. Avoidance of topical phenols and diets low in tyrosine may help. Replacement and repair of damaged tissue is also possible.

Hydroquinone-induced exogenous ochronosis is an avoidable dermatosis that is exceedingly difficult to treat. However, some studies show that treatment may be possible with a Q-switched alexandrite (755 nm) laser.

Individuals with this disorder are recommended to stop using hydroquinone-containing compounds. Awareness of this is important, as dermatologists may think the symptoms a patient is exhibiting are a melasma, and prescribe a hydroquinone-containing cream.

== See also ==
- Alkaptonuria
- Tyrosinemia
- Phenylketonuria
- List of cutaneous conditions
