= Drug-induced pigmentation =

Drug induced pigmentation may take on many different appearances, one of the most common being a change in the color, or pigmentation, of the skin.

== Presentation ==
Drug/Drug Group	Clinical Features
NSAIDs	Purple, red, yellow, slate, or blue-grey pigmented macules on the extremities and trunk – drug eruption
Antimalarials	Blue-ish pigmentation of lower extremities, but can also involve the entire nail bed, nose, cheeks, forehead, ears, and oral mucosa
Psychotropic Drugs	Blue-gray pigmentation on sun-exposed areas
Amiodarone	Blue-gray pigmentation on sun-exposed areas and yellow stippling of cornea
Tetracyclines	Brown pigmentation, most often on teeth
Heavy Metals	Gold – blue-gray pigmentation on sun-exposed areas, Silver – Silver granules in skin, nails, mucous membranes
Cytotoxic drug	Variable by molecule

== Cause ==
Drug-induced pigmentation of the skin may occur as a consequence of drug administration, and the mechanism may be postinflammatory hyperpigmentation in some cases, but frequently is related to actual deposition of the offending drug in the skin.The incidence of this change varies, and depends on the type of medication involved. Some of the most common drugs involved are NSAIDs, antimalarials, psychotropic drugs, Amiodarone, cytotoxic drugs, tetracyclines, and heavy metals such as silver and gold (which must be ingested, not just worn).

== Pathophysiology ==
There are 4 possible mechanisms to how this change may occur:

1. Accumulation of melanin, the skin pigment
2. Accumulation of drug or one of its products under any layer of the skin (usually the dermis or epidermis)
3. Accumulation of iron throughout the dermis from drug-induced post-inflammatory changes
4. The synthesis of special pigments, under direct influence of the drug

== See also ==
- Skin lesion
