= Hori's nevus =

- Other names: Acquired bilateral nevus of Ota-like macules
- Specialty: Dermatology

Hori's nevus, also known as acquired bilateral nevus of Ota-like macules, is a cutaneous condition characterized by multiple brown–gray to brown–blue macules, primarily in the malar region of the face.

== See also ==
- Nevus of Ota
- List of cutaneous conditions
