= Hyperpigmentation =

Darkening of an area of skin or nails due to increased melanin

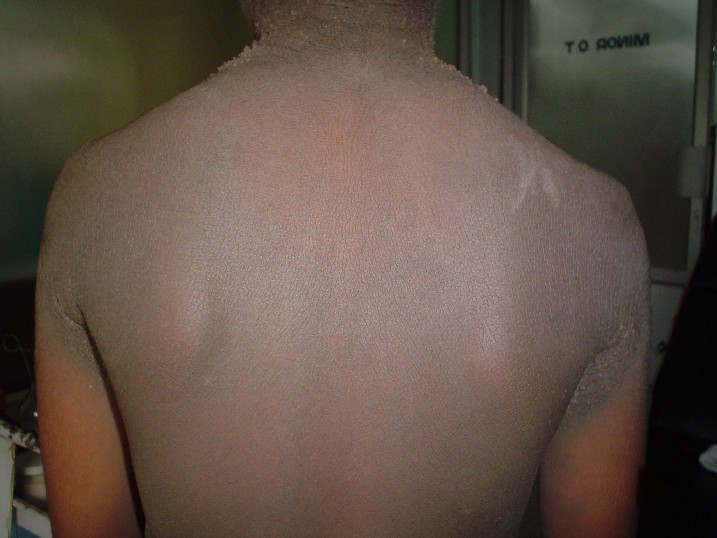
- Specialty: Dermatology
- Causes: Melanogenesis

Hyperpigmentation is a condition characterized by the darkening of an area of the skin or nails due to an excess production of melanin, the pigment responsible for skin color. This increase in melanin can result from a variety of factors, including sun exposure, inflammation, trauma, certain medications, or underlying medical conditions.

Hyperpigmentation is associated with numerous dermatological disorders and can present in various forms, such as melasma, post-inflammatory hyperpigmentation, and lentigines. It tends to be more prevalent and persistent in individuals with darker skin tones, who have more active melanocytes and are thus more prone to uneven pigmentation.

== Causes ==
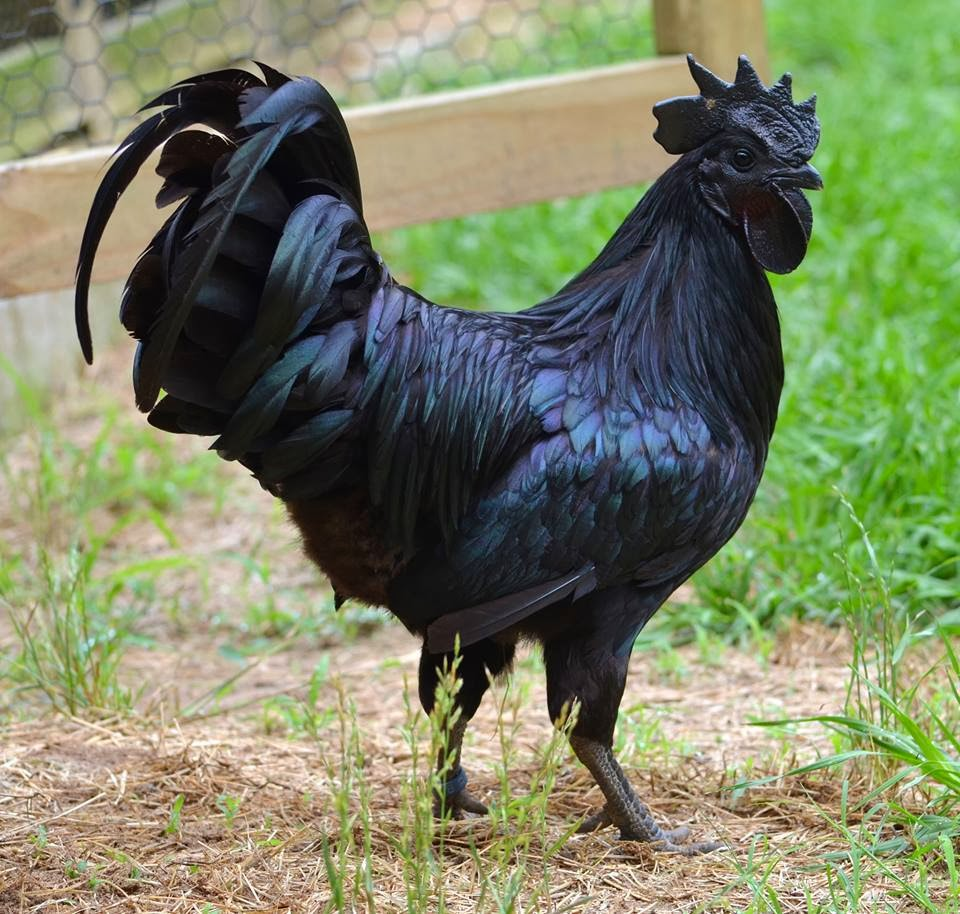
The distinctive solid black colour of the Ayam Cemani (rooster shown) chicken breed is due to hyperpigmentation, with the bird's feathers, skin, beak, and internal organs all being affected.

Hyperpigmentation can be caused by sun damage, inflammation, or other skin injuries, including those related to acne vulgaris. People with darker skin tones are more prone to hyperpigmentation, especially with excess sun exposure.

Many forms of hyperpigmentation are caused by an excess production of melanin. Hyperpigmentation can be diffuse or focal, affecting such areas as the face and the back of the hands. Melanin is produced by melanocytes at the lower layer of the epidermis. Melanin is a class of pigment responsible for producing color in the body in places such as the eyes, skin, and hair. The process of melanin synthesis (melanogenesis) starts with the oxidation of l-tyrosine to l-dopa by the enzyme tyrosine hydroxylase, then to l-dopaquinone and dopachrome, which forms melanin.

As the body ages, melanocyte distribution becomes less diffuse and its regulation less controlled by the body. UV light stimulates melanocyte activity, and where concentration of the cells is greater, hyperpigmentation occurs. Another form of hyperpigmentation is post-inflammatory hyperpigmentation. These are dark and discoloured spots that appear on the skin following acne that has healed.

=== Diseases and conditions ===
Hyperpigmentation is associated with a number of diseases or conditions, including the following:

- Addison's disease and other sources of adrenal insufficiency, in which hormones that stimulate melanin synthesis, such as melanocyte-stimulating hormone (MSH), are frequently elevated.
- Cushing's disease or other excessive adrenocorticotropic hormone (ACTH) production, because MSH production is a byproduct of ACTH synthesis from proopiomelanocortin (POMC).
- Acanthosis nigricans—hyperpigmentation of intertriginous areas associated with insulin resistance.
- Melasma, also known as 'chloasma' or the “mask of pregnancy,” when it occurs in pregnant women.— It is a common skin problem that causes dark discolored patchy hyperpigmentation. It typically occurs on the face and is symmetrical, with matching marks on both sides of the face. The condition is much more common in women than men, though men can get it too. According to the American Academy of Dermatology, 90 percent of people who develop melasma are women.
- Post-acne marks from post-inflammatory hyperpigmentation.
- Linea nigra—a hyperpigmented line found on the abdomen during pregnancy.
- Peutz–Jeghers syndrome—an autosomal dominant disorder characterized by hyperpigmented macules on the lips and oral mucosa and gastrointestinal polyps.
- Exposure to certain chemicals such as salicylic acid, bleomycin, and cisplatin.
- Smoker's melanosis
- Coeliac disease
- Cronkhite–Canada syndrome
- Porphyria
- Tinea fungal infections such as ringworm.
- Haemochromatosis—a common but debilitating genetic disorder characterized by the chronic accumulation of iron in the body.
- Mercury poisoning—particularly cases of cutaneous exposure resulting from the topical application of mercurial ointments or skin-whitening creams.
- Aromatase deficiency
- Nelson's syndrome
- Graves' disease
- Schimke immunoosseous dysplasia (SOID).
- As a result of tinea cruris.
- Due to B12 deficiency.
- Atopic dermatitis as a result of inflammation.

Hyperpigmentation can sometimes be induced by dermatological laser procedures.

== Diagnosis ==
- Skin examination including Wood's lamp examination.
- Viewing medical history.

== Treatment ==
There are a wide range of depigmenting treatments used for hyperpigmentation conditions, and responses to most are variable.

Most often treatment of hyperpigmentation caused by melanin overproduction (such as melasma, acne scarring, liver spots) includes the use of topical depigmenting agents, which vary in their efficacy and safety, as well as in prescription rules.

=== Topical treatments ===
Many topical treatments disrupt the synthesis of melanin by inhibiting the enzyme tyrosine hydroxylase.

Several are prescription only in the US, especially in high doses, such as hydroquinone, azelaic acid, and kojic acid. Some are available without prescription, such as niacinamide, l-ascorbic acid, retinoids such as tretinoin, or cysteamine hydrochloride. Hydroquinone was the most commonly prescribed hyperpigmentation treatment before the long-term safety concerns were raised, and the use of it became more regulated in several countries and discouraged in general by WHO. For the US, only 2% is at present sold over-the-counter, and 4% needs prescription. In the EU hydroquinone was banned from cosmetic applications.

=== Oral ===
Oral medication with procyanidin plus vitamins A, C, and E also shows promise as safe and effective for epidermal melasma. In an 8-week randomized, double-blind, placebo-controlled trial in 56 Filipino women, treatment was associated with significant improvements in the left and right malar regions, and was safe and well tolerated. Other treatments that do not involve topical agents are also available, including fraction lasers and dermabrasion.

=== Laser treatments ===
Laser toning using YAG lasers and intense pulsed light have been used to treat hyperpigmentation such as melasma and post-inflammatory hyperpigmentation.

== See also ==
- Drug-induced pigmentation
- Hypopigmentation
- List of skin conditions
