= L-Dopaquinone =

l-Dopaquinone

Names
- IUPAC name 3,4-Dioxo-3,4-dihydro-L-phenylalanine
- Systematic IUPAC name (2S)-2-Amino-3-(3,4-dioxocyclohexa-1,5-dien-1-yl)propanoic acid
- Other names o-Dopaquinone

Identifiers
CAS Number	4430-97-1
3D model (JSmol)	Interactive image
ChEBI	CHEBI:16852
ChemSpider	388447
PubChem CID	439316
UNII	5P7FHT9NL7
CompTox Dashboard (EPA)	DTXSID50897220
- InChI: InChI=1S/C9H9NO4/c10-6(9(13)14)3-5-1-2-7(11)8(12)4-5/h1-2,4,6H,3,10H2,(H,13,14)/t6-/m0/s1 Key: AHMIDUVKSGCHAU-LURJTMIESA-N; InChI=1/C9H9NO4/c10-6(9(13)14)3-5-1-2-7(11)8(12)4-5/h1-2,4,6H,3,10H2,(H,13,14)/t6-/m0/s1 Key: AHMIDUVKSGCHAU-LURJTMIEBS
- SMILES: N[C@@H](CC1=CC(=O)C(=O)C=C1)C(O)=O

Properties
Chemical formula	C_{9}H_{9}NO_{4}
Molar mass	195.174 g·mol^{−1}
- Except where otherwise noted, data are given for materials in their standard state (at 25 °C [77 °F], 100 kPa). Infobox references

l-Dopaquinone also known as o-dopaquinone is a metabolite of L-DOPA (L-dihydroxyphenylalanine) and a precursor of melanin.

Biosynthesis of melanin occurs in melanocytes, where tyrosine is converted into DOPA and then dopaquinone, which goes on to be formed into pheomelanin or eumelanin.
